= List of works by Nathaniel Hitch =

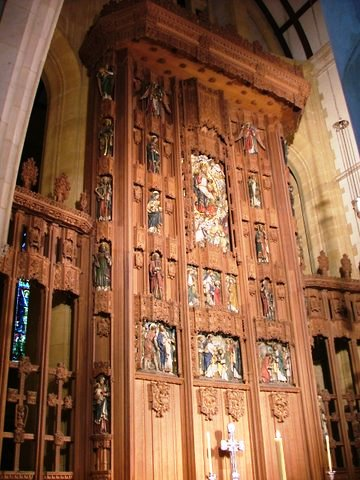
The reredos in St Peter's Cathedral in Adelaide, carved by Hitch

This list enumerates the types of projects that the British sculptor Nathaniel Hitch was involved in over the course of his career, roughly from 1871 to 1935.

Hitch ran his own business, first as a sole worker and later with hired employees to assist in the execution of work. Most of his work came through business relationships that he had with architects. John Loughborough Pearson provided commissions for Hitch over the course of his career, providing more than 75% of his work.

== Notable works ==
=== All Saints' Church in Hove, Sussex ===
All Saints Church in Hove, Sussex, commissioned by the Reverend Thomas Peacey, was designed by John Loughborough Pearson and built with the assistance of his son Frank. Churches’s work here is arguably some of his best and the carving on the reredos and the bishop's throne is of the very highest standard. Pevsner described the reredos as "sumptuously carved." He also carved the sedilia.

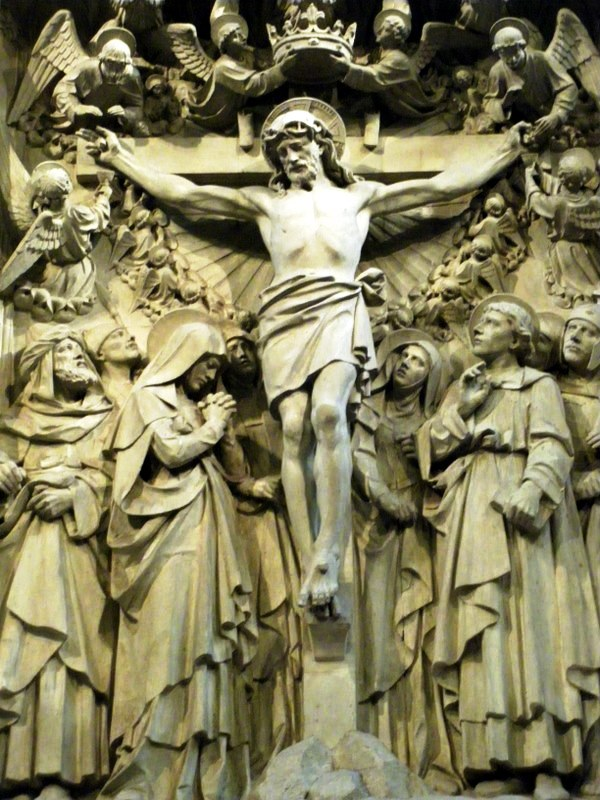
The central panel of Nathaniel Hitch's reredos in Hove

=== Beverley Minster ===
The original reredos and altar screen at Beverley Minster was erected in the reign of Edward III between c. 1320 and 1340. At the time of the dissolution of the Beverley College of Secular Canons in 1547, the eastern face of the screen remained nearly as it was when built but the statuary on the western front was demolished and much of the carving mutilated. All that remained was covered over with plaster upon which was painted the Commandments, the Lord's Prayer and the Apostles' Creed. In 1825–26 the reredos was rebuilt by Mr. Comins, the master mason, but this reconstruction fell short of filling the 12 niches and decorating the 36 panels. In 1897, and to John Loughborough Pearson’s designs, Hitch carved twelve statues for the screen, this due to the generosity of Canon Nolloth who put up the required funds. Nolloth also funded completion of the thirty six panels which were filled by opus sectile mosaic by Messrs. Powell. Several photographs of Hitch’s work are shown below courtesy of John Phillips of the Friends of Beverley Minster.

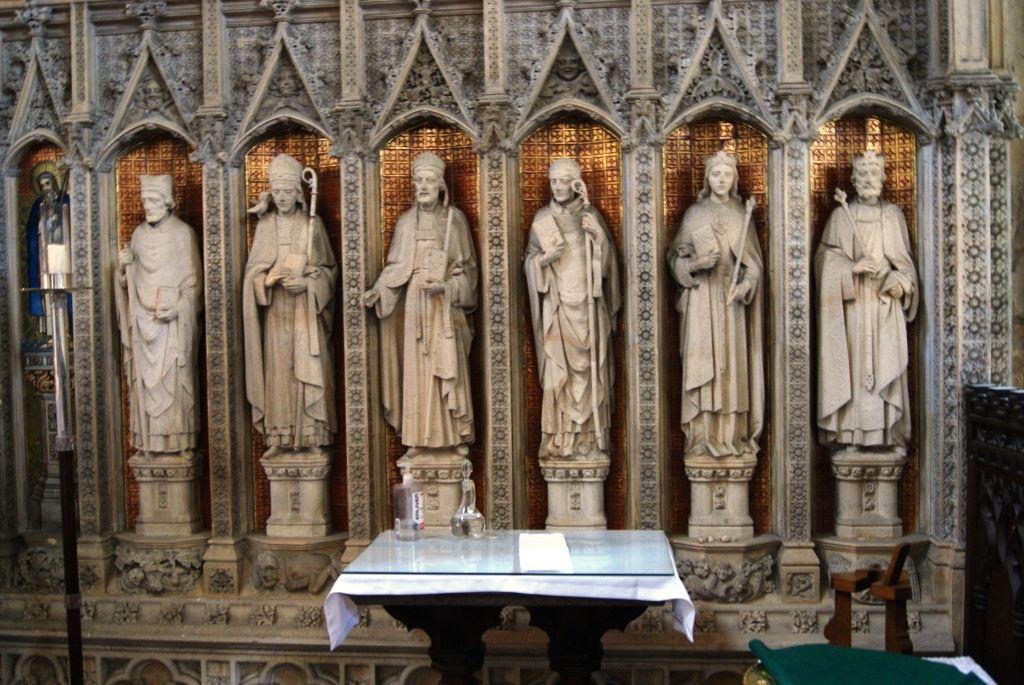
Beverley Minster Screen. Courtesy of John Phillips of Friends of Beverley Minster.

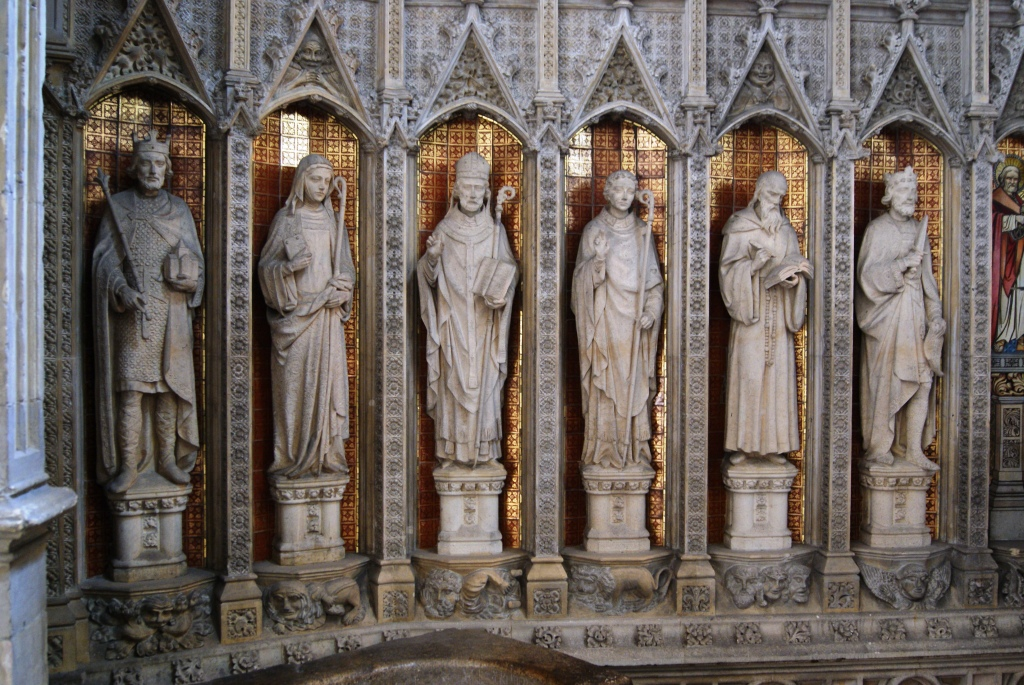
Beverley Minster Screen. Courtesy of John Phillips of Friends of Beverley Minster.

=== The Black Friar ===
John Betjeman declared the public house the Black Friar to be "the most perfect art nouveau in London" and this public house designed by Herbert Fuller-Clark, boasts sculptural work by Hitch, Frederick T Callcot, Henry Poole and E.J. and A.T. Bradford. It dates back to around 1875 but it was Alfred Pettitt, who was the publican there in the first quarter of the twentieth century, who commissioned a total make-over. Pettitt called in H. Fuller-Clark and he was to transform the building! Hitch and Callcott worked on the first phase of the building's decoration in around 1905 with Hitch carving a series of stone grotesques on the exterior and similar work in wood for the interior. The second phase started in 1917 and now Hitch carved in oak a relief featuring music making monkeys for the bracket for the clock with the motto "Tones Make the Music" and also carved the tiny capitals, with the names of drinks and other mottoes on them, in the simulated window embrasure of the niche or snug. The two monkeys forming the clock bracket play viola de gamba and horn. There are ten of the miniature capitals, each one illustrating a word or phrase: "Rum Punch" "Food", etc.

In the exterior grotesques shown below Hitch amusingly carves two imps blowing horns, two others dancing to their music. We have a friar feeding pie to an ass, a friar cutting into a cheese watched by two starvelings, a friar sitting on a barrel and singing to the accompaniment of two grotesque instrumentalists. We have a group of grotesque musicians, gnomes carrying lanterns and gnomes singing. Frederick T Callcott completed some copper sculptures for the pub’s interior: "Carols, flanked by Summer and Winter"/"Tomorrow will be Friday"/"Saturday Afternoon"/"Friar with Hour Glass and Friar preparing to boil an egg" with further work of this nature being added by Henry Poole: " A good thing is soon snatched away"/"Don’t advertise, tell it to a gossip"/"Contentment surpasses Riches" and " Four Imps representing Art, Literature, Music and Drama". Poole also created some hanging lamps and some ceiling reliefs . E.J. and A.T Bradford added several keystones and capitals illustrating Aesop's Fables and various nursery rhymes.

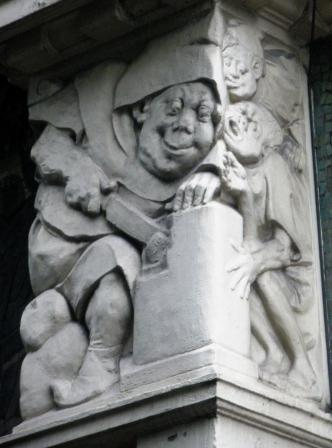
Friar cuts into cheese

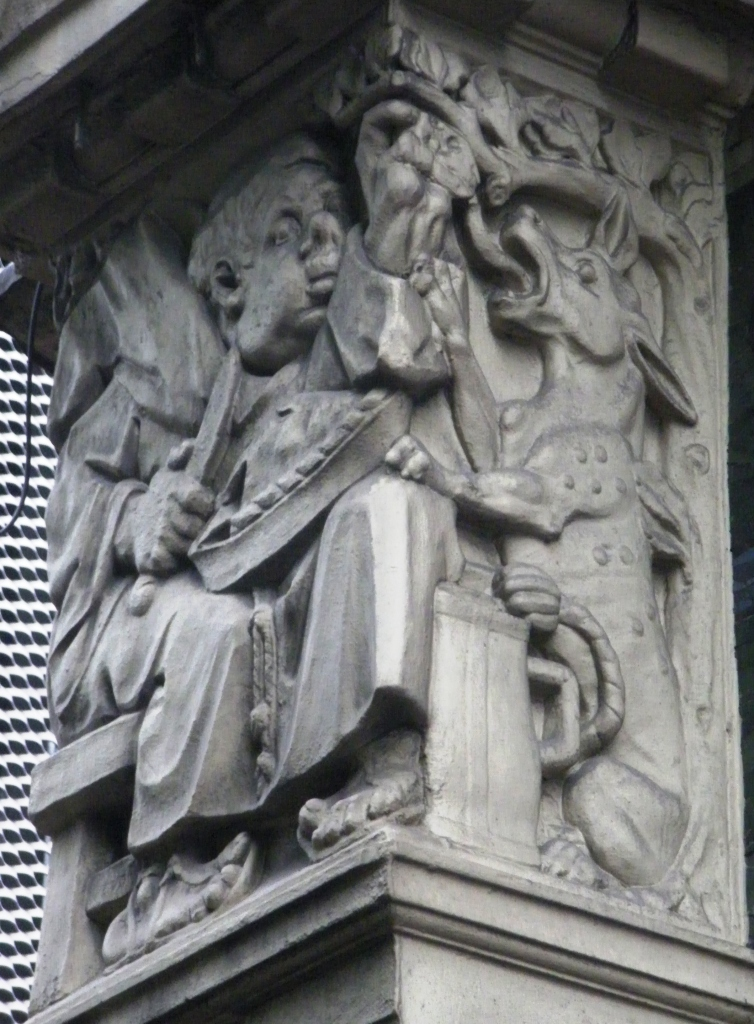
Friar feeds ass

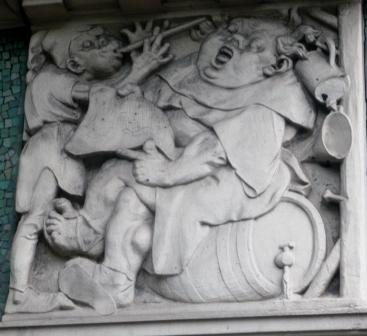
A happy friar

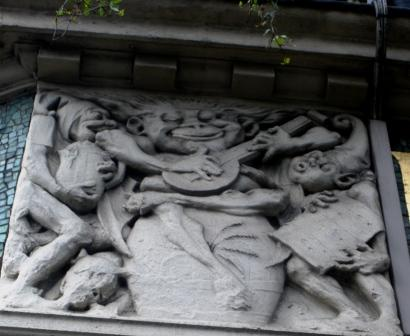
Gnomes

=== Buller Memorial ===
William Douglas Caröe designed the Memorial to General Sir Redvers Buller VC in The Collegiate Church of the Holy Cross and the Mother of Him who Hung Thereon in Crediton, Devon and Hitch carved the sculpture of St George which forms part of that memorial.

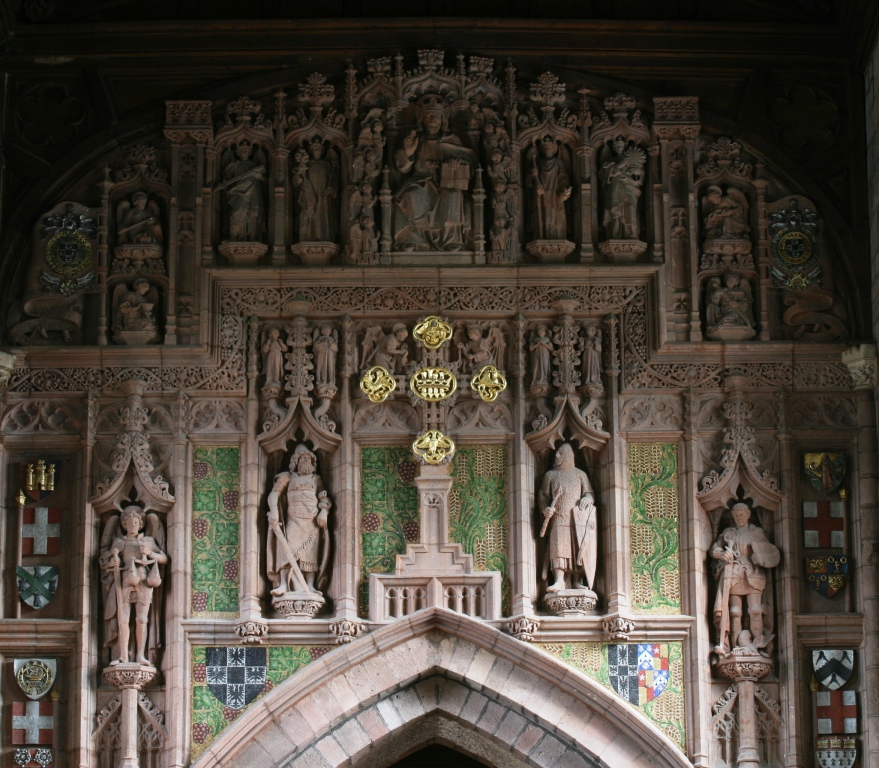
The Buller Memorial. Courtesy Keith Barker.

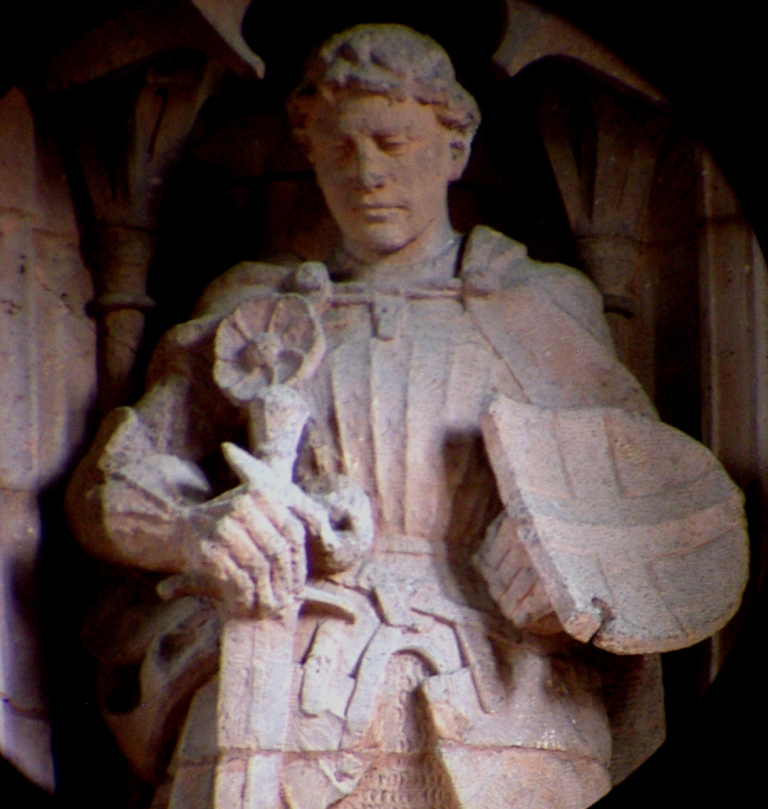
St George on Buller Memorial. Courtesy Keith Barker.

=== Church of the Holy Spirit, Clapham ===
For the Church of the Holy Spirit in Clapham, South London, Hitch carried out a series of carvings for the oak choir stalls and chancel screen. The church was built between 1912 and 1913 and has a Grade II listing. It was designed by Henry Philip Burke Downing in the Gothic style. Hitch also worked on an oak rood with Our Lady and St John on either side of Our Lord and an ornate Bishop’s Chair or Throne with the arms of the then newly created Diocese of Southwark on the back. The carved lettering on the chancel screen involves quotations from the "Benedicite" and "Te Deum". Outside the church, Hitch carved a statue of Christ instituting Holy Communion and also carved the crucifix on the Burke Downing designed war memorial.

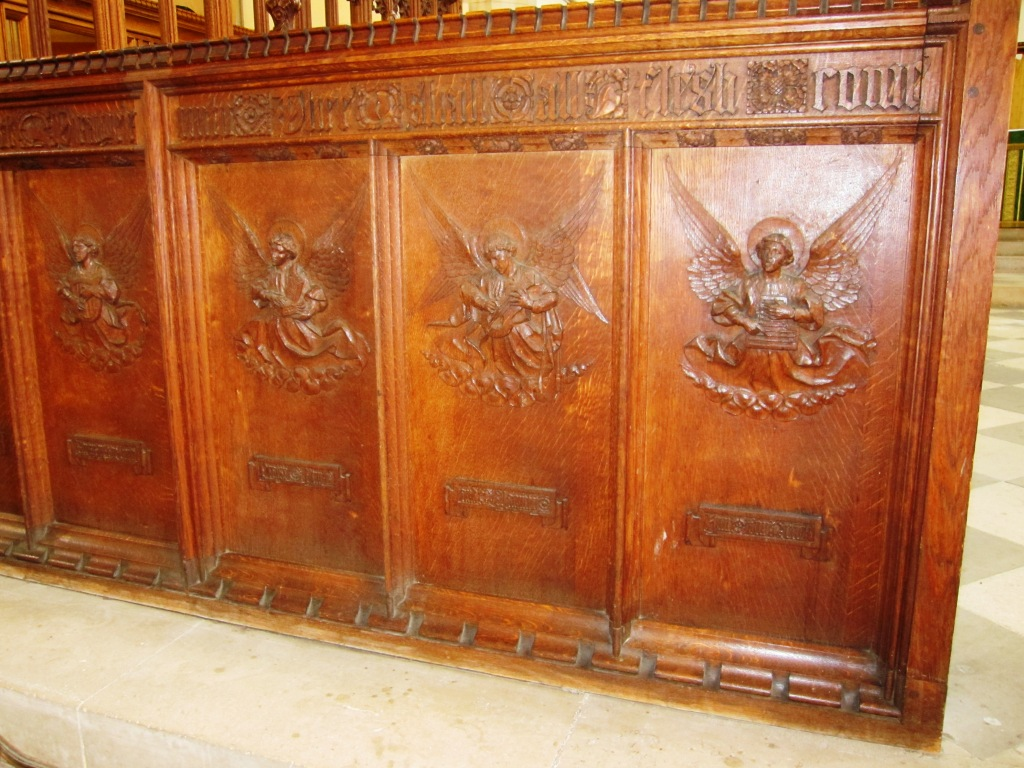
Carving on chancel screen. Church of Holy Spirit, Clapham. Photograph courtesy the Rev. Jeremy Blunden.

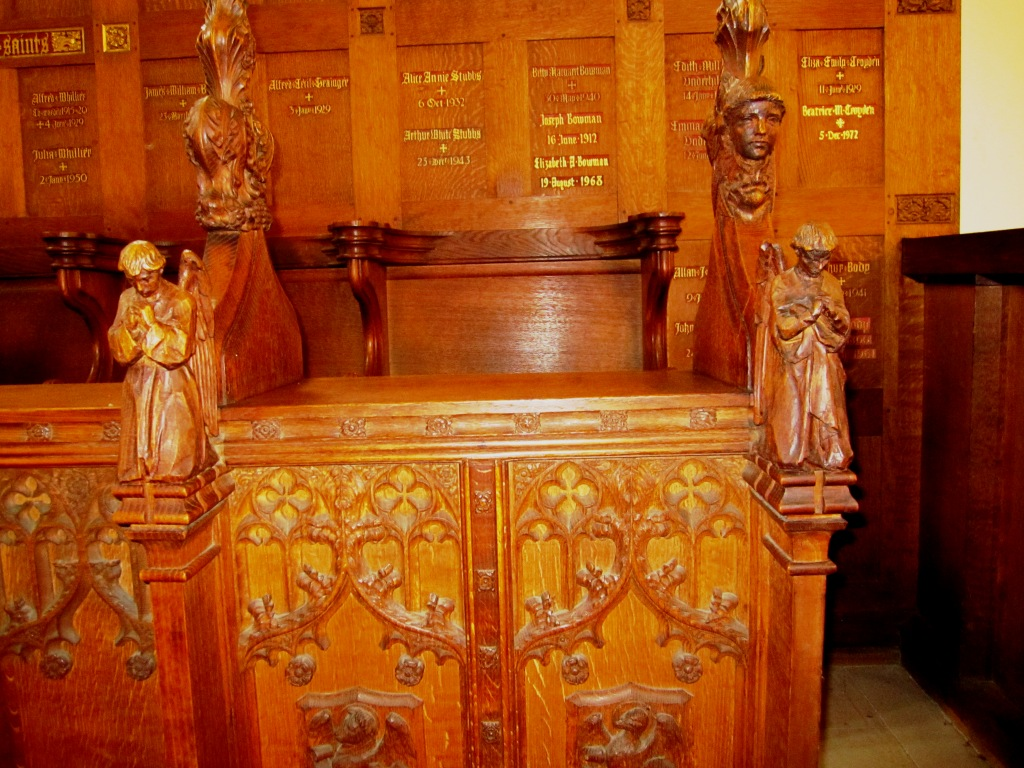
Carving on choir stall. Church of Holy Spirit, Clapham. Photograph courtesy the Rev. Jeremy Blunden.

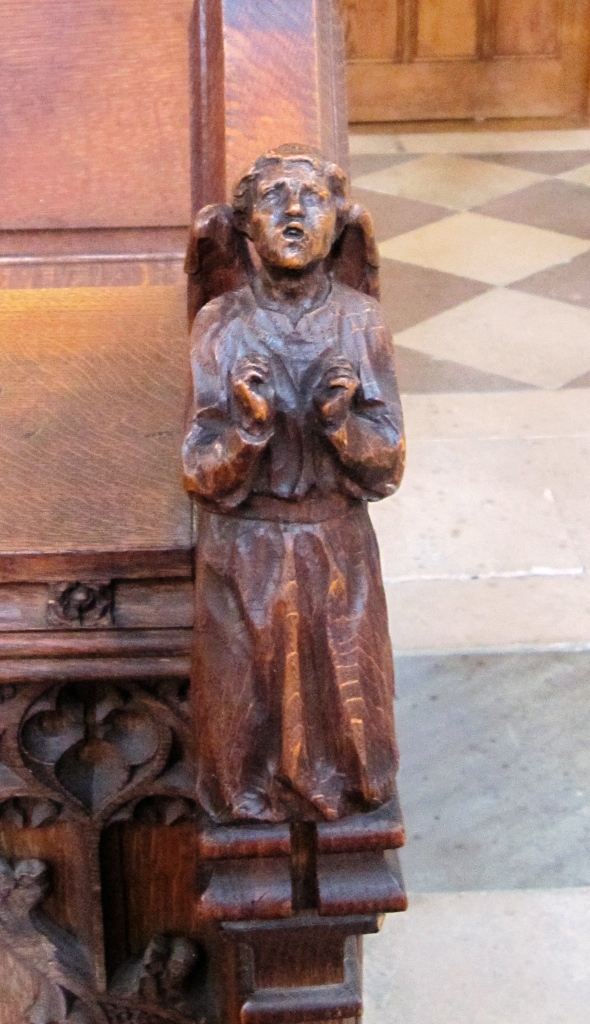
Carving on choir stall. Church of Holy Spirit, Clapham. Photograph courtesy the Rev. Jeremy Blunden.

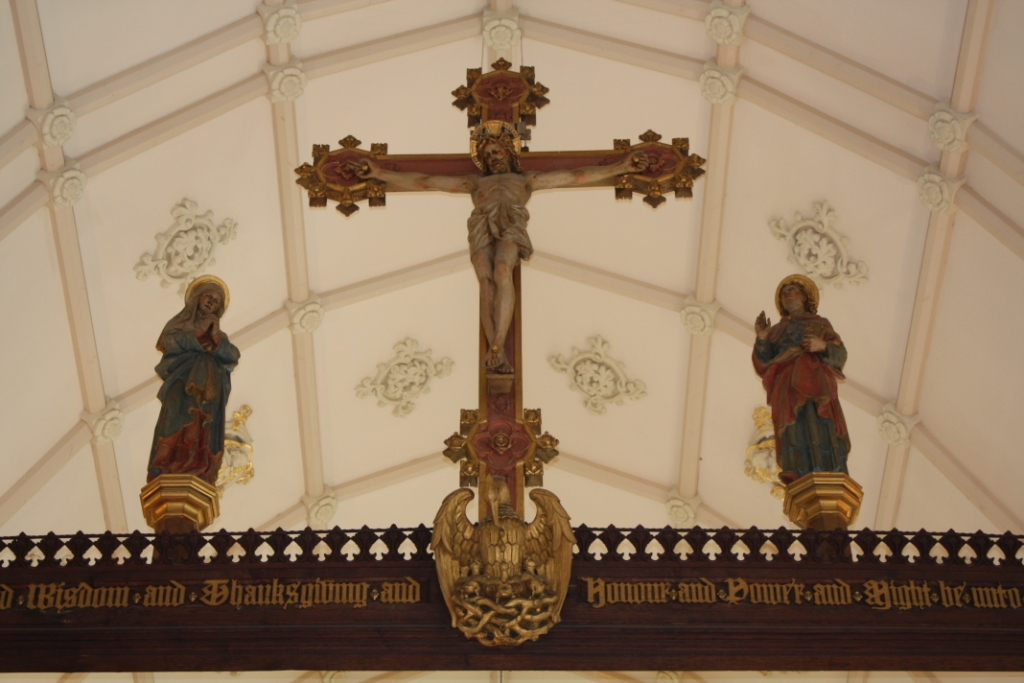
Rood in Clapham.

=== New College Chapel, Oxford ===
John Loughborough Pearson designed the upper section of the huge reredos in New College Chapel, Oxford and Nathaniel Hitch did all the figural work. This reredos replaced one in stucco dating from 1789 by Wyatt.

The reredos has five tiers of figures and at the bottom some marble reliefs by Westmacott. In the immaculately kept New College Archives are a series of sepia photographs of Hitch’s figures taken before they were sent from his workshop near Vauxhall to Oxford and in the archive's record 3140 are letters dated between 1883 and 1892 relating to the reredos and these include several letters written by Hitch himself. Some of these letters show the lengths to which Hitch went to ensure that his statues were true to life. In the instance of the statue of William of Wykeham we read how a mask was made of the Winchester effigy of William of Wykeham and then sent to Hitch so that he could be sure that he achieved an accurate likeness. In looking at the relationship between architect/designer and sculptor one is sometimes struck by the way in which the architect/designer received credit for a particular work with the sculptor very often getting little or no mention and one letter written by Hitch shows that this did matter to him. In this letter he thanks the addressee for sending him a newspaper cutting, one assumes about the reredos, and notes "They name the architect I notice but not the sculptor." We also learn from these letters of the great care taken in the detail of each of the individual statues. "St Peter carries the keys", "James Minor a club" and "Simon a saw" etc. etc. A photograph of the complete reredos is shown below, another shows some of Hitch's carvings and a close-up of the statue of Moses complete with tablet and horns gives us a good idea of Hitch's ability as a mason.

In 1891 Hitch made statues for a stone sedilia and large stone screen.

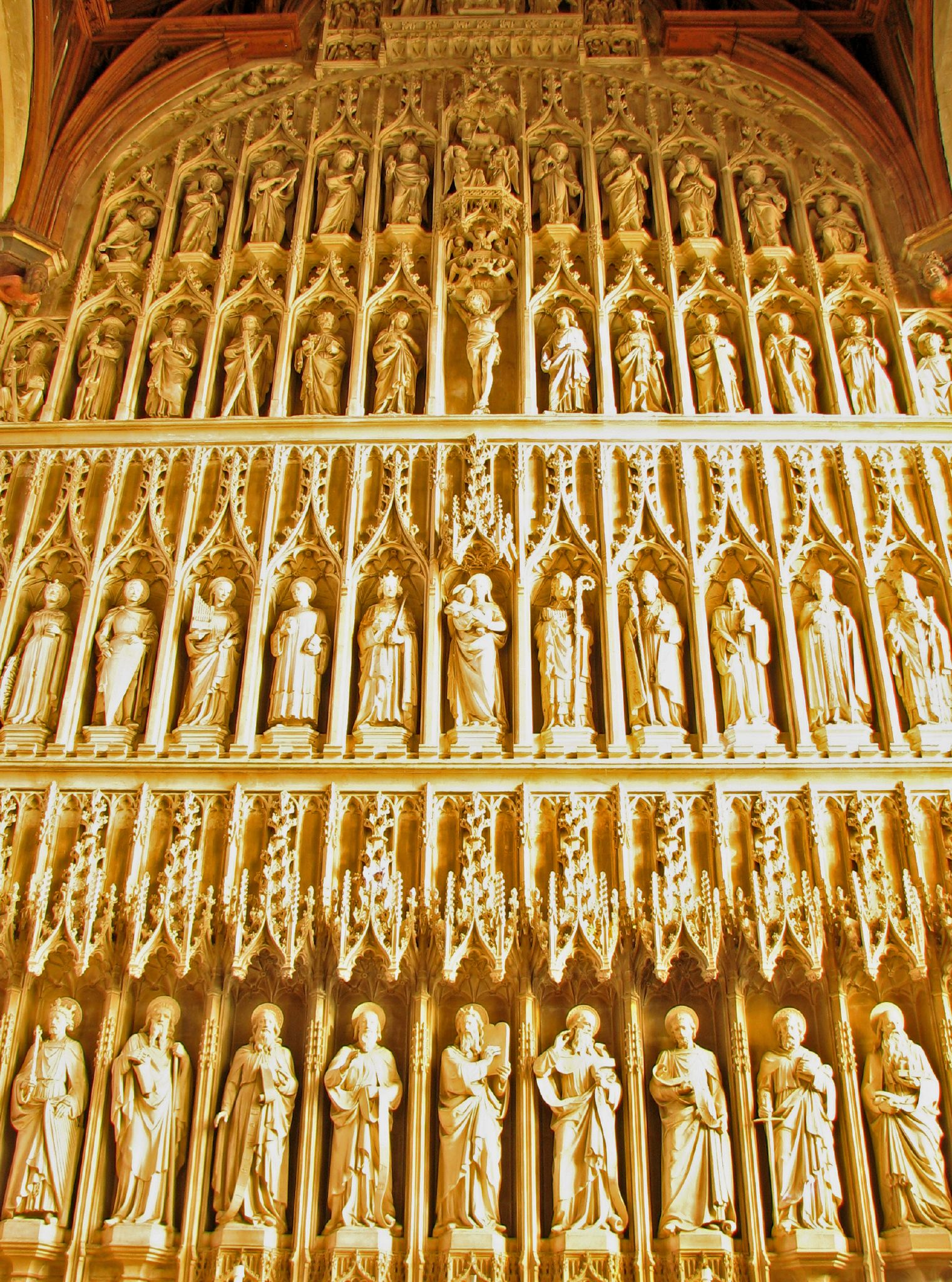
The reredos in New College Chapel, Oxford.

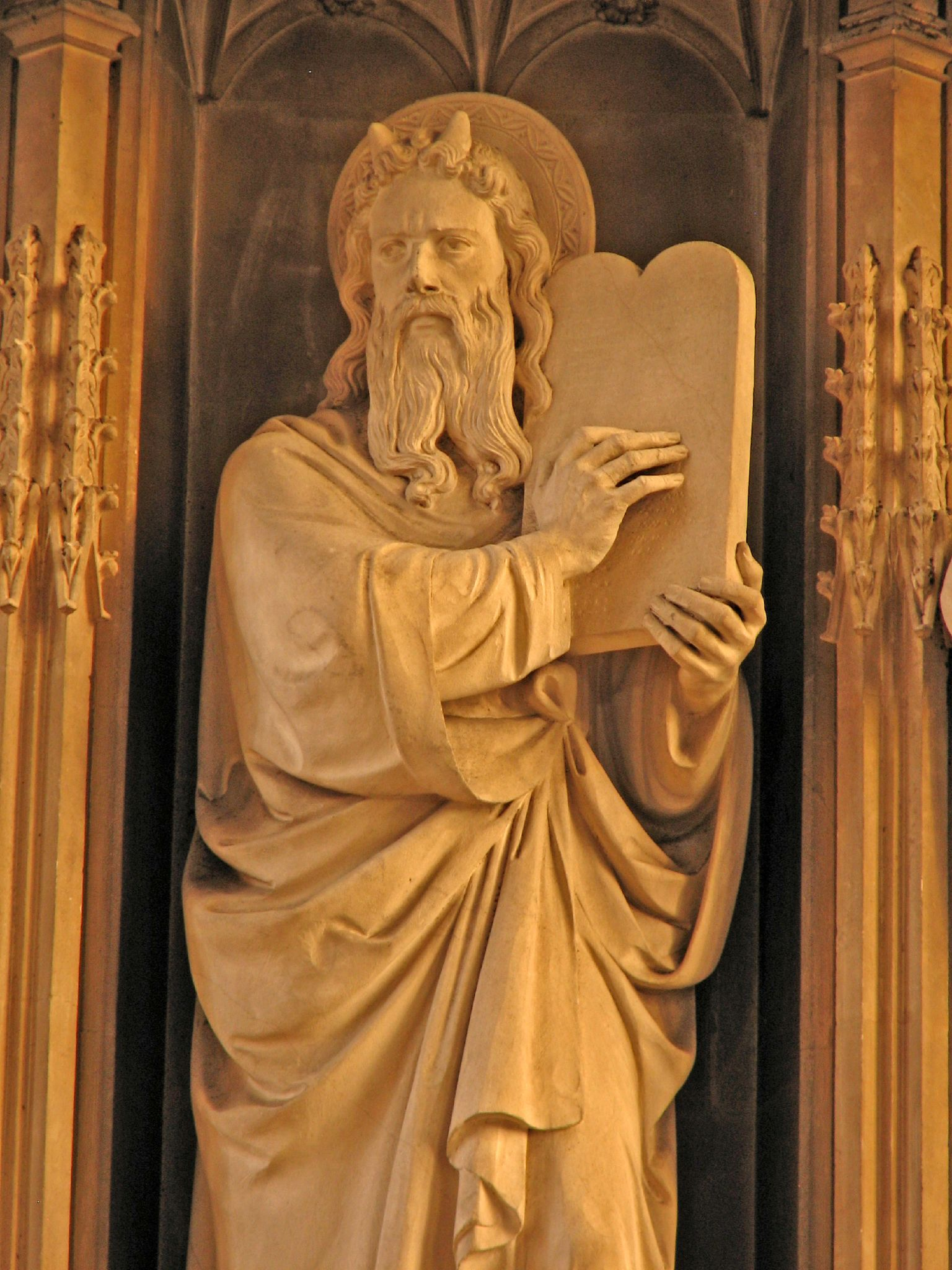
Statue of Moses – part of the reredos in New College Chapel, Oxford.

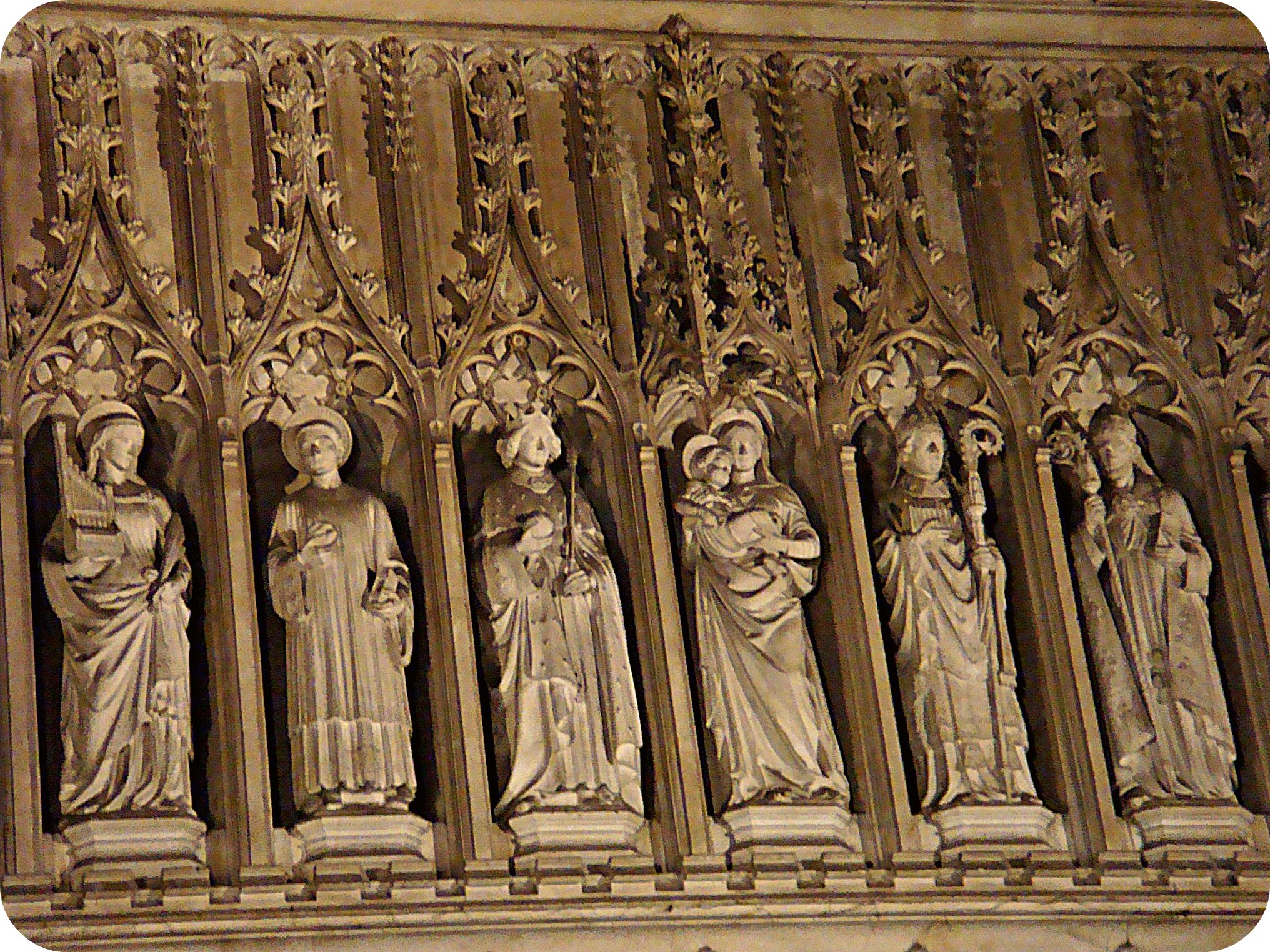
More of Hitch’s carvings on the New College Chapel reredos Photograph courtesy cameliatwo.

=== Parish Church of Woodham, Surrey ===
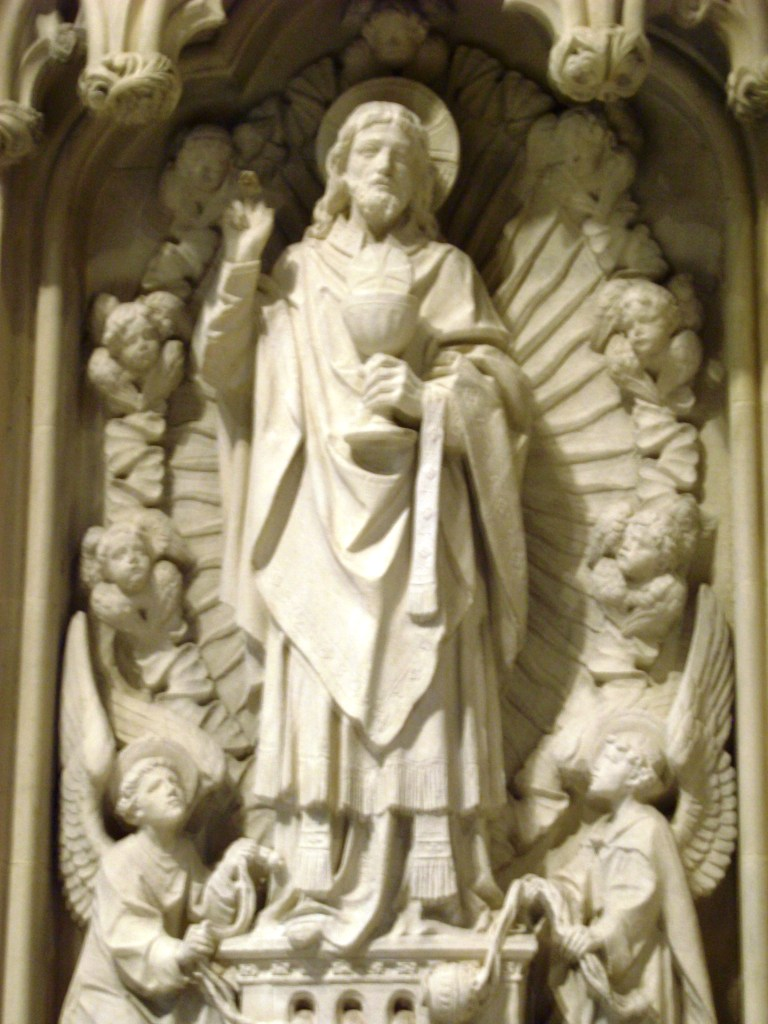
Hitch's carving of "Our Lord as the Everlasting Priest", Woodham Parish Church. Image courtesy Stephen Moore.

Hitch carved the church's pulpit and completed the figural work for the reredos in the Parish church of Woodham in Surrey. The pulpit is on the north side of the Nave arch and is carved from oak. It was dedicated on Sunday 26 October 1913 by the Archdeacon of Surrey. The reredos was designed in early 14th Century Gothic style by the Reverend Ernest Geldart and was executed in 1915 in Corsham stone from Corsham quarries and was dedicated in 1915. At the time of dedication only the central panel was complete and the niches were unoccupied, but at rapid intervals the figures were completed and the reredos was dedicated by the vicar on Easter Eve 15 April 1922. An aumbury and arcading on the north wall was added in 1918 and the work completed in 1921. Again Hitch did all the carving involved. The central panel of the reredos is surmounted by a canopy in carved stone and contains a representation of Our Lord as the everlasting Priest "after the order of Melchizedek " surrounded by Cherubs and bearing the sacramental Cup and Bread of Life. He stands upon an altar, from whence, beneath His feet, there issue the Four Rivers of the Gospel. On either side, kneeling angels adore Him and offer incense, which the Prophet says should accompany the "Pure Offering" in every place. On the base of the pedestal are carved the words from the Te Deum- "Tu Rex Gloria Christe" (Thou art the king of Glory, O Christ). The statues inserted in the niches and the wall panels complete the theme of the reredos "ALL THY SAINTS GIVE THANKS TO THEE" for they represent saints of every age and all climes, including England. The evangelists are shown above the central niches, not in human form, but as the four living creatures revealed to St John in the Heavenly Vision:- the Angel of St Matthew, the Lion of St Mark, the Ox of St Luke, and the Eagle of St John. All bear scrolls inscribed with the first words of their gospels in Latin : - "Liber generationis Jesu Christi"; "Initium Evangelii Jesu Christi"; "Fuit in diebus herodis"; "In principio erat Verbum". The names of the sixteen saints represented and from North to South are St Francis of Assisi, St Hilda-Abbess, St Helena- matron, St Edward the Confessor-King, St Swithun-Confessor, Venerable Bede-Confessor, St Paul-Apostle, St Peter- Apostle, St Stephen-Martyr, St George-Martyr, St Jerome-Doctor, St Augustine of Hippo-Doctor, St Columba-Missionary, St Faith- Virgin, St Etheldreda-Queen and Abbess and St Hugh of Lincoln-Abbot. Special interest attaches to the figure of St Swithun as he carries a small model of Winchester Cathedral. St Swithun, the friend and educator of Alfred the Great was Bishop of Winchester A. D. 860, and in the "Bededictional of St Ethelworld" (a magnificently illuminated manuscript, formally one of the Treasures of the Chapter and now in the British Library), there is a drawing of the cathedral showing the columns and capitals, the roof with its red tiles and above it the golden weathercock. By kind permission of the dean a tracing was made of the copy given to the Chapter by the Duke of Westminster, the then owner and from this a drawing was made which Hitch followed for his sculpture. Hitch also carried out the carving on the front altar in the Lady Chapel. The central panel represents the moment of the presentation of the Holy Child in the Temple. Simeon is holding the child, while Mary is kneeling in an attitude of deep devotion and St Joseph is standing a little behind with his head inclined in prayer. On each side are panels with carved lilies with their leaves open. A photograph is shown here of Hitch’s carving of "Our Lord as the Everlasting Priest", part of the reredos.

=== St David's Church, Exeter ===
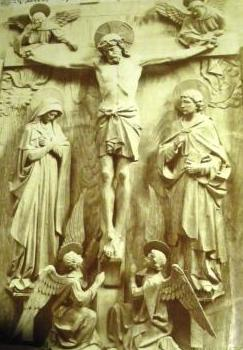
Central panel St David's Exeter reredos

Working with William Douglas Caröe, Hitch undertook the figural carving for the reredos and choir stalls. In M.G. Smith's booklet he states that Caröe persuaded Nathaniel Hitch of London, probably the best "Gothic" carver in the country at that time, one who had collaborated with Caröe in furnishing St John’s Mountfitchett, to undertake the figure carving in the reredos and choir stalls, though the rest of the wood carving was done by local craftsmen."

The carvings on the Choir Stalls include important figures in the Church:

- Niches on the south side dealing with Praise and Hymns depict Ephraim of Edessa who represents the hymn writers of the Ancient Church of Syria and in another niche Gregory of Nazianzus who represents Greek hymn-writers. In another is Ambrose, "father of Church song," the Ambrosian Chant, who introduced from the East the practice of Antiphonal Chanting.
- In the Boy’s Stalls on the south side are four kneeling figures of writers from among English Bishops. We have Ken once the rector of Brightstone on the Isle of Wight and author of "Awake my soul and with the sun" and "Glory to Thee, my God this night". We then have Heber, Bishop of Calcutta, who wrote "From Greenland’s icy mountains.", "The Son of God goes forth to war" and "Holy, Holy, Holy, Lord God Almighty.". We are then reminded of Walsham How, Bishop of Wakefield, author of "O Jesu, Thou art standing.", " For all the saints who from their labours rest." and "We give Thee but Thine own" and finally we have Bickersteth, Bishop of Exeter, who wrote "Peace, perfect peace." and "Till He come."
- In the Stalls on the north side the carvings deal with "Liturgical Prayer." Leo, Gelasius and Gregory, Bishops of Rome in 440, 492 and 549 were believed to have written important Sacramentaries. These Roman Sacramentaries are divided into three classes, the Leonian, Gelasian and Gregorian.
- Further kneeling figures in the Boys' Stalls are Osmund, who wrote the "Sarum Missal.", Archbishop Cranmer, head of the revising Committee by whom the First Prayer Book of Edward VI was issued in 1549, Cosin, Bishop of Durham, composer of the Collects for 3rd Sunday in Advent, 6th Sunday after Epiphany and Easter Eve who did invaluable work on the final revision of the Prayer Book in 1661, Andrewes, Chaplain to Queen Elizabeth and Bishop of Winchester and author of "Manual of Devotion".
- On the front bench-ends are four large figures representing the "Sources of Christianity"- St Gregory and St Augustine represent the Roman Source of English Christianity and can be found on the South Side, whereas on the north side we have St Columba representing the Scotic source and St David.
- In front of the Choir Stalls the conversion of the Heptarchy is illustrated by carvings of six Kings and the Bishops to whom they and their people owed the introduction of Christianity. Ethelbert and Augustine/Edwin and Paulinus/Oswald and Aidan/Oswy and Chad/Kynegils and Birinus and Redwald and Felix.
- In front of the Priests' Stalls are four men associated with the organisation of the Church. There is Wilfrith, Theodore, Aldhelm and King Geruntius.

=== St Giles' Church, Bradford-on-Tone ===
For St Giles' Church in Bradford-on-Tone in Somerset and working with William Douglas Caröe, Hitch completed work on figures for a reredos, depicting the Evangelists Matthew, Mark, Luke and John. These figures stand in arched niches on either side of a central panel. They are bearded except for John and all wear gold cloaks over white tunics trimmed with gold and red. Each holds a quill pen in his right hand and a red book with a gold clasp in his left. They all wear red sandals. Matthew has a red purse suspended from his girdle and John a gold one.

Each of the four Evangelists is identified by his "attribute", carved beside him on his plinth and bearing a red sash with the saint’s name on it written in rustic capitals: a winged man, a winged lion, a winged ox and an eagle represent Matthew, Mark, Luke and John respectively. There is a nimbus behind the head of each saint. The saint’s niches are painted dark blue/green with a cinquefoil, gold edged, highlighted with red in the spandrels.

In the spandrels between each pair of saints, Matthew and Mark to the North, Luke and John to the South, is raised decoration painted gold, with stylised leaves, flowers and fruit, but different on each side. A gold ball of oak leaves and "bell-flowers" is found above and to the North and South of Matthew and Mark and a ball of oak leaves and vine leaves similarly above and to the North and South of Luke and John. These match the carvings on the cill of the aumbry in the North wall of the chancel. Above the niches there is blind tracery with a cusped lozenge design and above this a frieze of billets. More blind arcading with trefoil heads fills the wall between the niches and the floor.

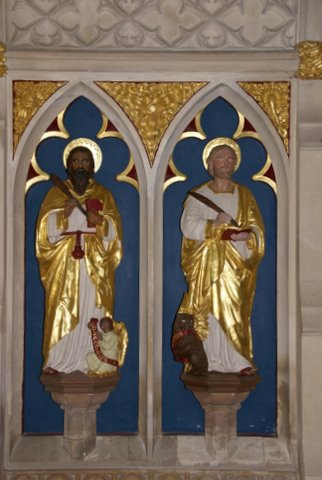
St Matthew and St Mark on reredos in St Giles' Church, Bradford-on-Tone, Somerset. Courtesy Colin Dinsdale and June Best.

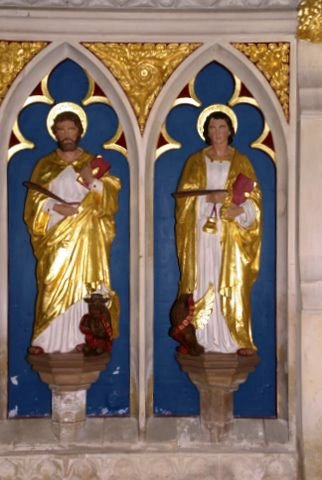
St Luke and St John on reredos in St Giles' Church, Bradford-on-Tone, Somerset. Courtesy Colin Dinsdale and June Best.

=== St. Giles's Church, Haughton ===
==== Architect John Loughborough Pearson ====
In 1887, John Loughborough Pearson was charged with the reconstruction of St Giles’ Church in Haughton, Staffordshire. This reconstruction included a reredos in Caen stone and Hitch carried out all the carving for that reredos. Hitch also carved the pulpit in Caen Stone and with red marble shafts. The reredos consists of three panels.

The central panel shows the Transfiguration and we see Jesus with Peter, James and John. "Six days later Jesus took Peter and James and John the brother of James, and led them up a high mountain where they were alone; and in their presence he was transfigured; his face shone like the sun, and his clothes became white as the light." St Matthew 17. 1-3. A photograph of the central panel is shown below. All photographs including the pulpit and reredos shown courtesy of Michael Cooksley.

To the right and left of this central panel are eight smaller panels, these in groups of four. In the four panels on the left hand side are scenes from the Childhood of Jesus.

In the top panel first left, we see Mary and Joseph with Jesus lying in a manger. "After the angels had left them and gone into heaven, the shepherds said to one another 'Come we must go straight to Bethlehem and see this thing that has happened, which the Lord has made known to us' so they went with all speed and found their way to Mary and Joseph and the baby lying in a manger." St Luke 2.16

In the top panel second left we see Mary, Jesus and the Three Wise Men. "Entering the house, they saw the child with Mary his mother, and bowed to the ground in homage to him; then they opened their treasures and offered him gifts of gold, frankincense, and myrrh." St Matthew 2.11.

In the bottom panel first left we see Mary, Joseph and baby Jesus fleeing to Egypt. "So Joseph rose from sleep, and taking mother and child by night he went away with them to Egypt, and there he stayed until Herod’s death." St Matthew 2. 14,15.

In the bottom panel second left we see Jesus in the temple. "And after three days they found Jesus sitting in the temple surrounded by the teachers, listening to them and putting questions; and all who heard him were amazed at his intelligence and the answers he gave". St Luke 2. 46.47.

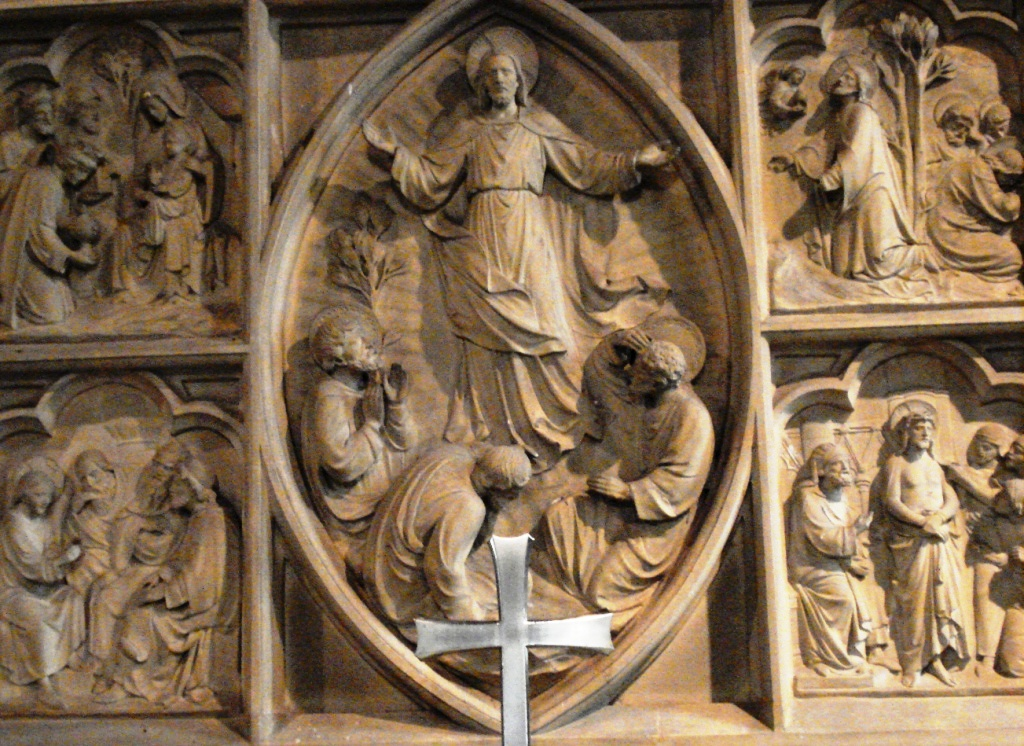
St Giles' Church-Central panel

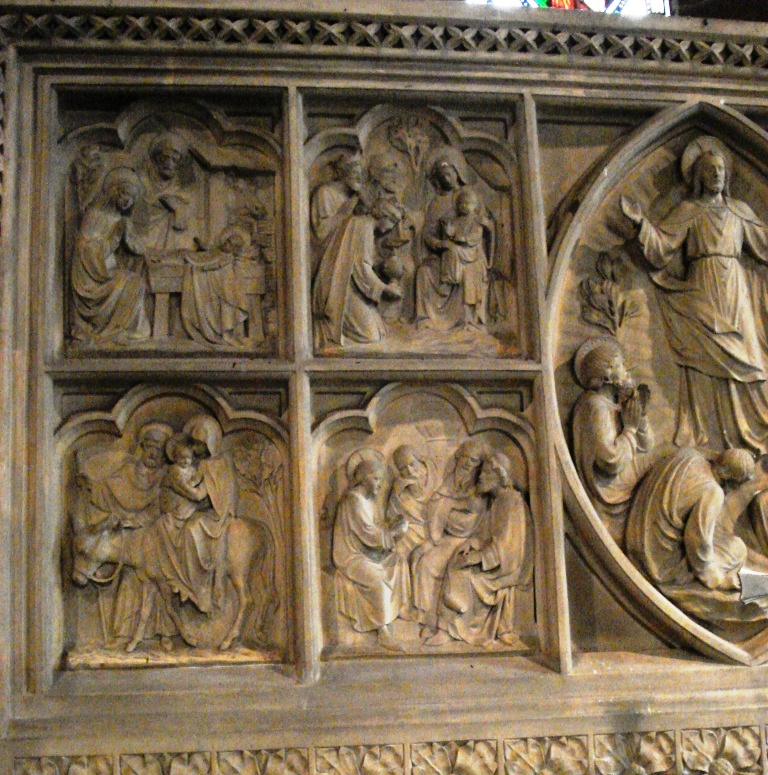
St Giles' Church-Left hand side of reredos

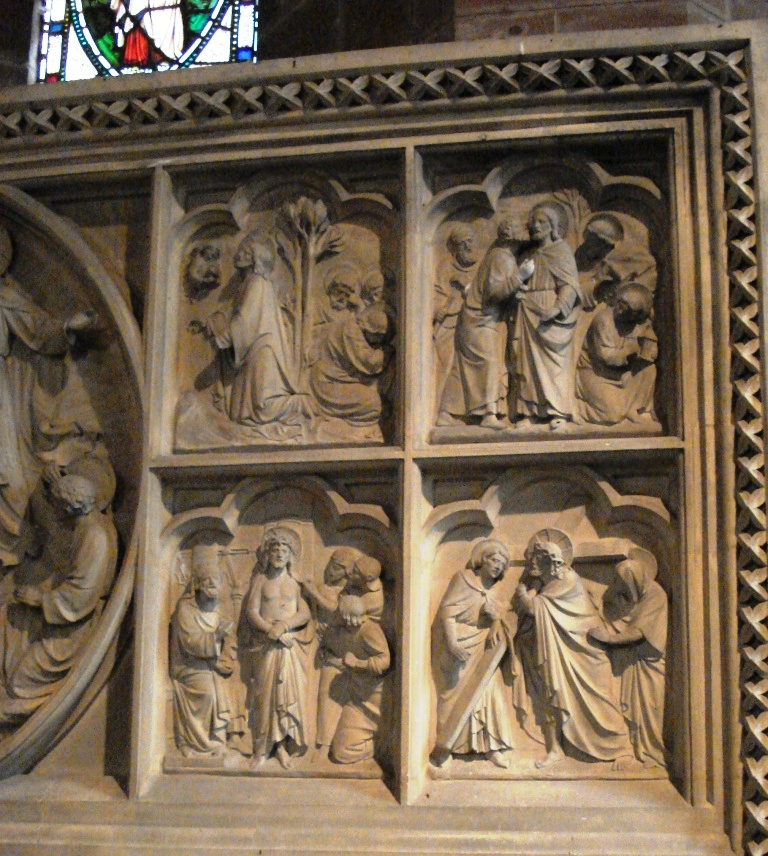
St Giles' Church-Right hand side of reredos

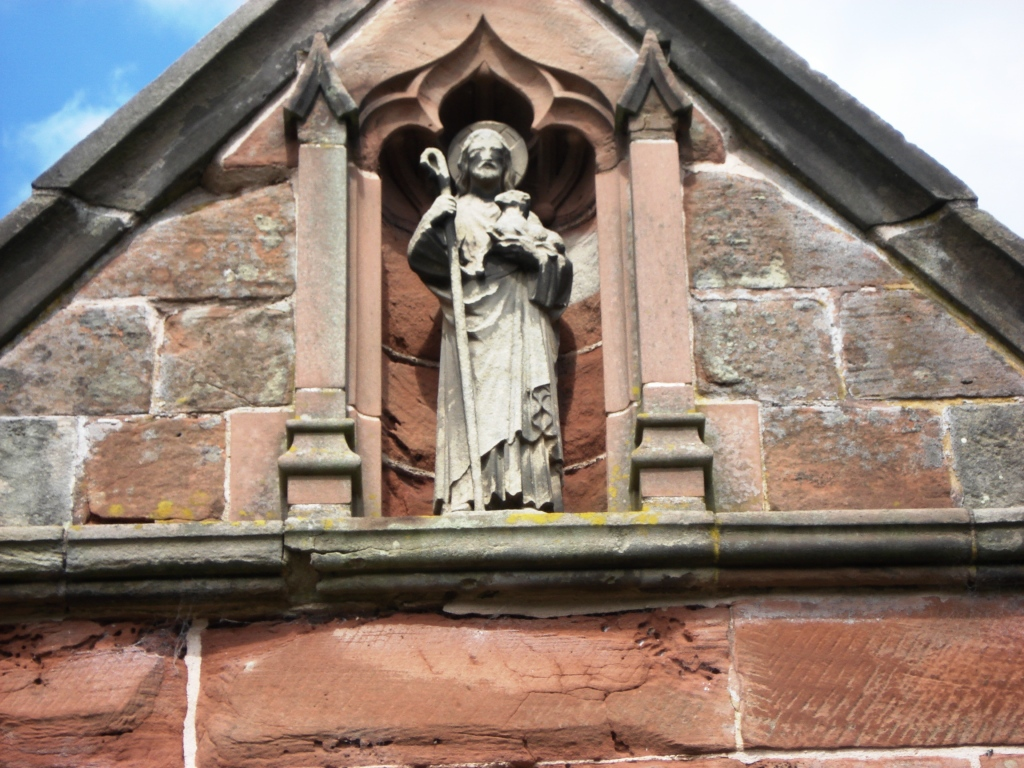
"The Good Shepherd"

In the four panels on the right hand side are scenes from the Passion. In the first top right panel we see Jesus agonising in the garden of Gethsemane with the disciples asleep. Jesus had knelt down and prayed this prayer- " Father, if it be thy will, take this cup away from me; yet not my will but thine be done". And now there appeared to him an angel from heaven bringing him strength and in anguish of spirit he prayed the more urgently; and his sweat was like drops of blood falling to the ground. When he rose from prayer and came to the disciples he found them asleep, worn out by grief." St Luke 22.42-46.

In the top second right panel we see Jesus betrayed and arrested. "While he was still speaking a crowd appeared with a man called Judas, one of the twelve, at their head, He came up to Jesus to kiss him; but Jesus said. "Judas would you betray the Son of Man with a kiss? St Luke 22. 47-49.

In the bottom first right panel we see Caiaphas questioning Jesus. "Jesus was led off under arrest to the house of Caiaphas the High Priest, where the lawyers and elders were assembled. The chief priests and the whole of the Council tried to find some allegation against Jesus on which a death sentence could be based" St Matthew 26. 57-59.

In the bottom panel second right we see Jesus led away to be crucified. “Jesus was now taken in charge and, carrying his own cross, went out to the place of the skull, as it is called, (or in the Jews' language, Golgotha.).” St John 19.17.

When John Loughborough Pearson was completing his work in 1888 a statue of the "Good Shepherd" was put in a niche above the porch. Hitch carved this statue and a photograph is shown above.

==== Architect William Douglas Caröe ====
After John Loughborough Pearson’s death, William Douglas Caröe became the church architect and in 1910 he designed arches and arcades which were placed on either side of the central panels. They held figures of six martyrs and all six figures were carved by Hitch in Hollington stone.

Below are photographs of these figures. We have three from the Bible being Zechariah, the first martyr, St Stephen, the first Christian martyr, and St James, the first Apostolic martyr. Then there are three martyrs from church history, Polycarp, representing the early church, St Alban, the first British martyr and Archbishop Cranmer, the Reformation martyr.

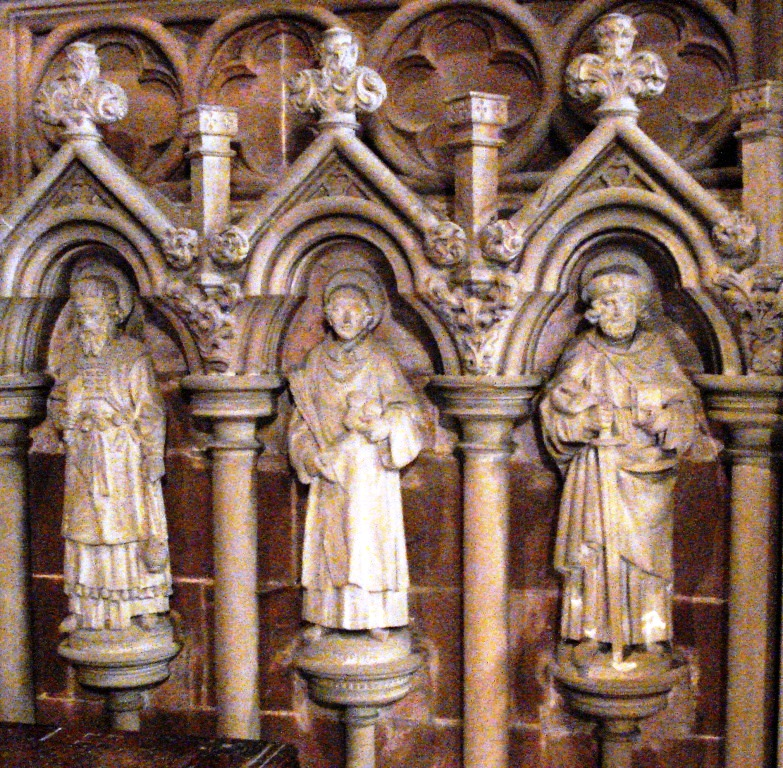
St Giles' Church in Haughton, Staffordshire

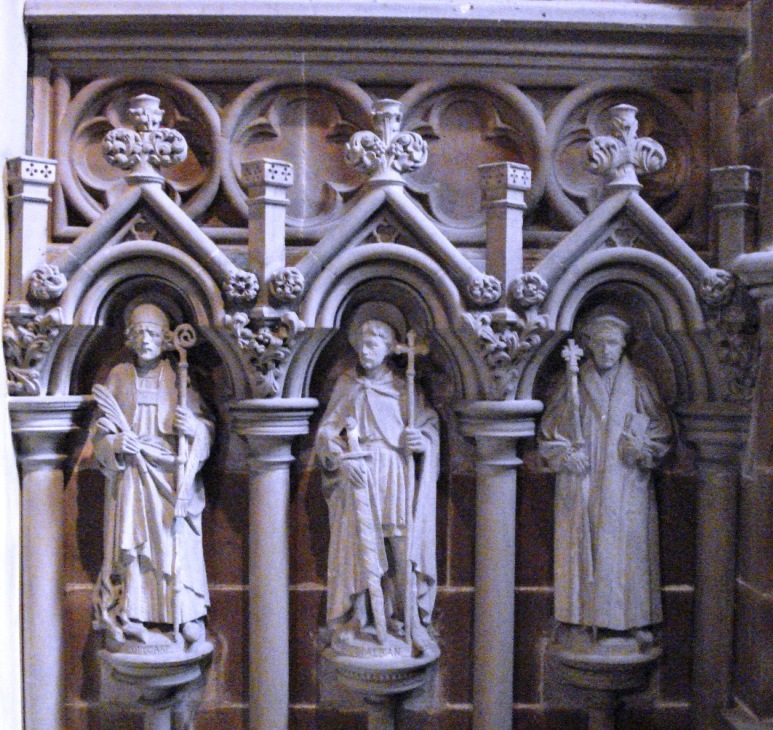
St Giles' Church in Haughton, Staffordshire

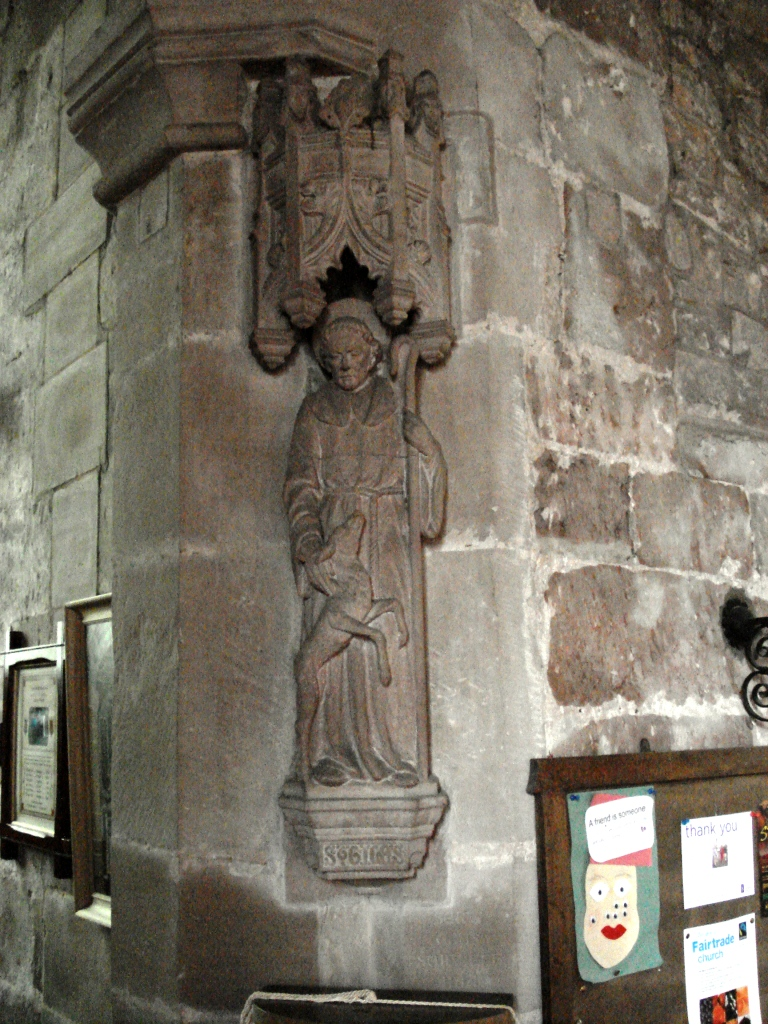
St Giles statue by Frederick Brook Hitch

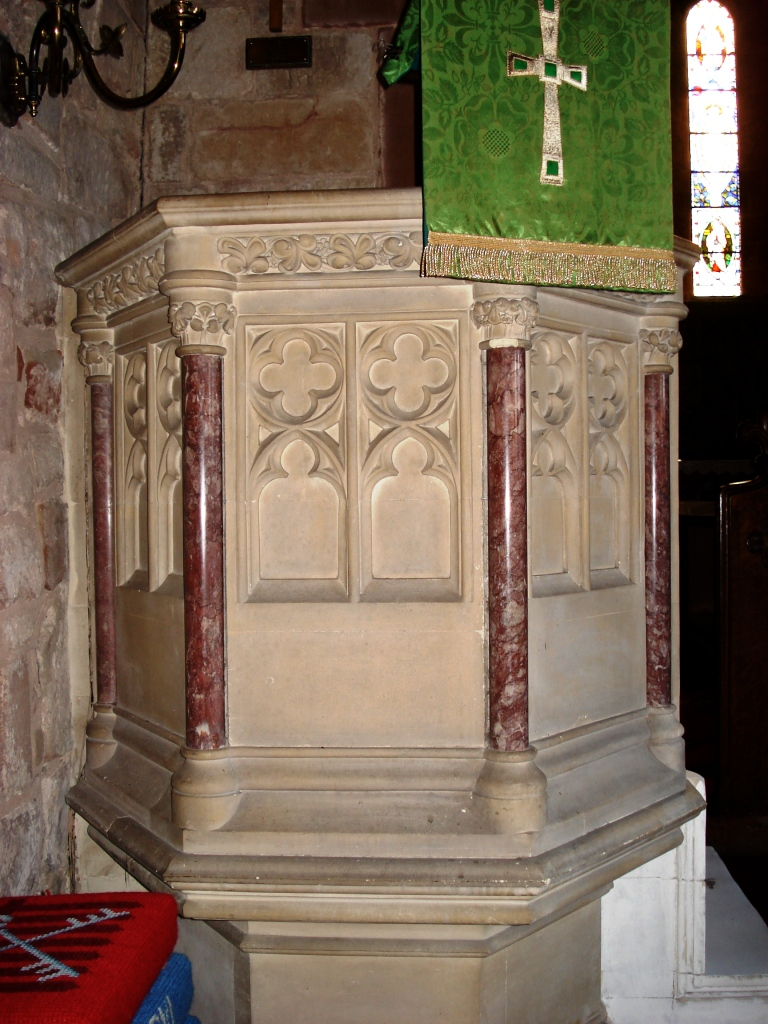
Pulpit in St Giles

In 1948 Hitch’s son, Frederick Brook Hitch sculpted a statue of St Giles which stands inside the church on a support for the tower. This was designed by Alban Caröe, William Douglas Caröe’s son.

=== St Margaret’s Church, Horsforth ===
For St Margaret’s Church in Horsforth in Yorkshire, Hitch did the figural work on the reredos. It was designed by Frank Loughborough Pearson and portrays the risen Lord triumphantly proclaiming the glorious truth of the resurrection. The figures in the top row are all of angels. From left to right, they are: The Angel of Passion with cross/Raphael, the Angel of Guidance with staff, water bottle and wallet/Michael, the Angel of Justice with sword and scales/Gabriel, the Angel of Purity with Lily/Uriel, the Angel of Light and the Angel of the Resurrection. There are also two angels in the centres of the side panels. The bottom figures are representations of the Patron Saints of the United Kingdom, of the Diocese of Ripon and Leeds and of St Margaret’s itself. From left to right, they are: St. George of England (in battle array)/St. Wilfrid (with bishop's mitre, crook and robes)/St. Andrew of Scotland (holding a model of the cross saltire on which he died) /St. Patrick of Ireland (with conquered serpents)/St. Margaret of Antioch (crowned, bible in hand and slain dragon at her feet) and St. David of Wales (with emblematic dove on his shoulder). The building of the full church had taken many years. The original designer of the church was John Loughborough Pearson and the nave and chancel were completed and dedicated in 1883 but the belfry, spire and porches were only dedicated in 1901. The dedication of the reredos came much later on 23 July 1911. As already stated the design was by John Loughborough Pearson’s son who also designed a reredos for the Lady Chapel.

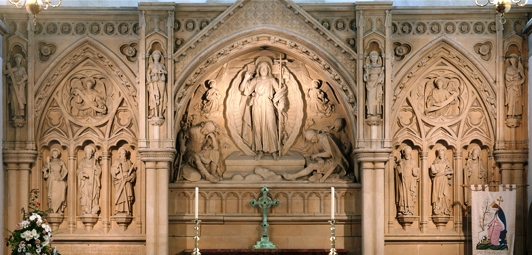
Horsforth reredos. Courtesy Derek Grasby

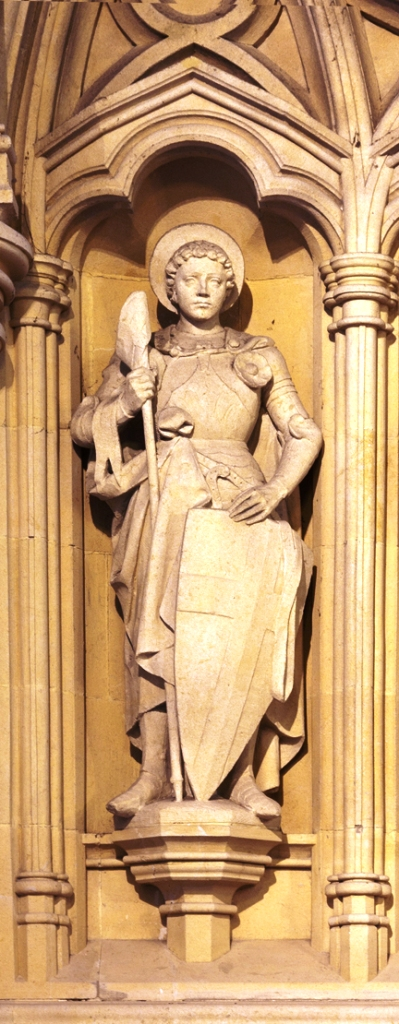
St George on Horsforth reredos. Courtesy Derek Grasby

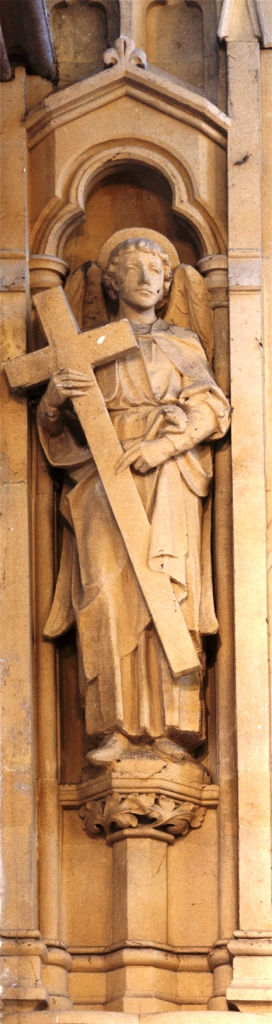
Angel of Passion- Horsforth. Courtesy Derek Grasby

=== St Mary's Church, Streatley ===
Hitch carved the alabaster reredos at St Mary's Church in Streatley to John Loughborough Pearson's design. He executed the work in 1893. The central panel shows the Crucifixion and on the left side of this is a scene from our Lord's childhood and on the right side the Resurrection. Between the panels and on either side are smaller statuettes, the four outer ones being the Evangelists Matthew, Mark, Luke and John. A statuette on the north side of the central panel is of Aaron and on the south side is Elias, the two representing priests and prophets. The reredos was erected in memory of Mrs. Stone, the then lady of the manor, and funded by the Stone family. Streatley and its neighbour Goring are pleasing little Oxfordshire villages and Streatley featured in Jerome K. Jerome's "Three Men in a Boat." Laurence Binyon the poet who wrote "For the Fallen" :"They shall grow not old, as we that are left grow old." lived in the Parish and Richard Adams wrote "Watership Down" when living in Streatley. Adams and his family were worshippers at St Mary. Photographs of the reredos are shown here and a full photograph of the reredos can be seen on the church’s website.

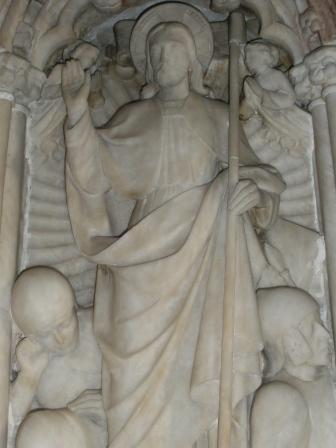
The reredos at St Mary’s Streatley.

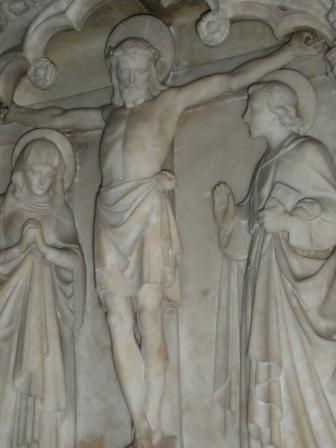
The reredos at St Mary’s Streatley.

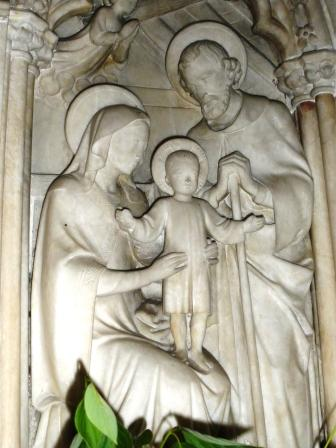
The reredos at St Mary’s Streatley.

=== St Stephen's Church, Bournemouth ===
For St Stephen's Church, Bournemouth, Hitch did carvings on the marble pulpit, stalls, triptych and altar table in 1889 and in 1898 worked on the Altar Table and Triptych (reredos) based upon John Loughborough Pearson’s designs. The pulpit shows three scenes from the New Testament. In the centre Jesus is shown preaching the Sermon on the Mount to his disciples and at the sides we have St Peter preaching on the first Whitsunday (Pentecost) and St Paul preaching at Athens.

The triptych which towers above the altar has the crucified Jesus in the centre, with the Blessed Virgin and St John standing on either side. On the left is Elijah and his raven and on the right the Prophet Isaiah. On the left wing of the triptych are St Stephen and Moses and on the right we have St John the Baptist and David. Above are the figures of four bishops: St Ambrose, St Augustine, St Clement and St Swithun each of whom has had a church dedicated in their honour in Bournemouth. As it was Moses and Elijah who appeared with Jesus at his Transfiguration, Hitch has carved around the cross of Christ representatives of the Old Covenant and the New and Easterns and Westerns, all gathered in united adoration. See photograph of the reredos below.

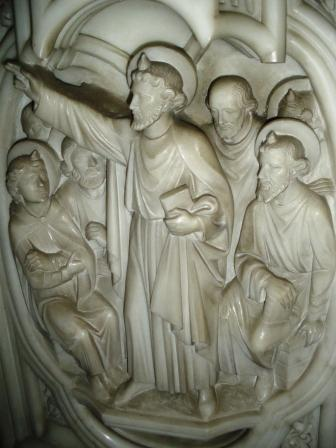
Pulpit at St Stephen’s, Bournemouth.

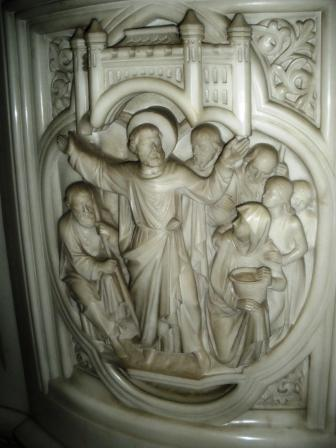
Pulpit at St Stephen’s, Bournemouth.

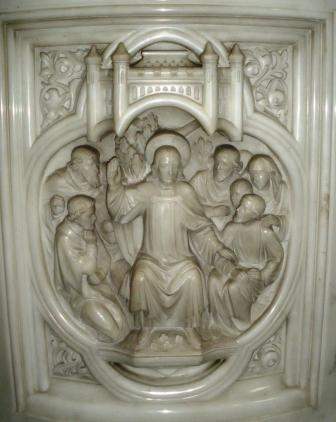
Central panel of pulpit in St Stephen’s Bournemouth- The Sermon on the Mount.

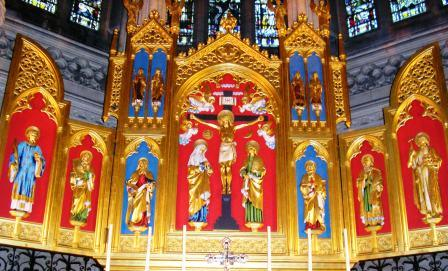
The reredos in St Stephen's Church, Bournemouth.

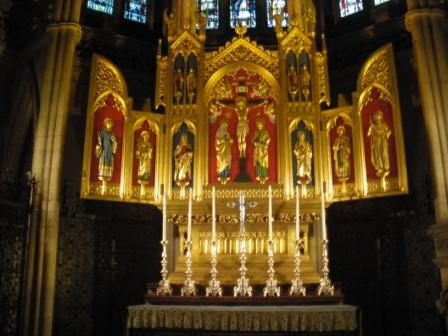
The Triptych in St Stephen’s Church Bournemouth.

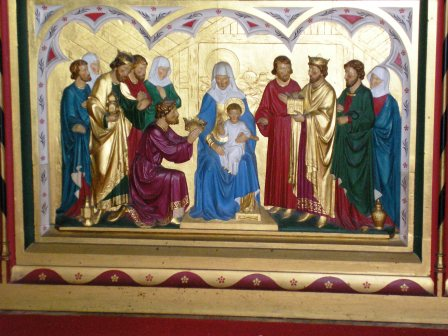
The central panel of the Altar Table at St Stephen’s, Bournemouth.

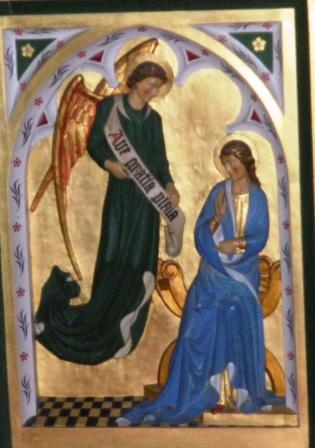
The Annunciation. St Stephen's Bournemouth.

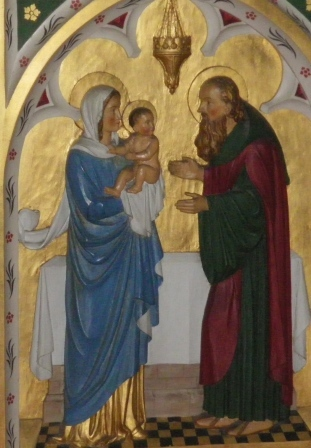
Jesus is presented in the Temple. St Stephen's Bournemouth.

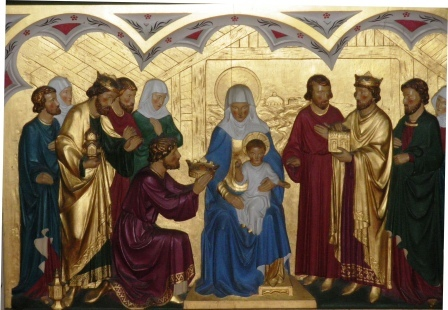
The Adoration of the Magi. St Stephen's Bournemouth.

The central panel of the High Altar shows the Adoration of the Magi and on the left the Annunciation of the Blessed Virgin Mary and on the right the Presentation of Christ in the Temple.

Hitch also carved the Altar in the Lady Chapel and the carvings on the choir stalls these to Frank Loughborough Pearson’s design. These are in Baltic oak and amongst the figures carved are St Cecilia, patron saint of music, St Catharine, who was martyred on a wheel, St Stephen and various other saints, martyrs and church leaders. The panels at the end of the pews show miracles performed by Jesus and parables told by Him.

=== Sidney Sussex College Chapel, Cambridge ===
Hitch carried out some figural sculpture for the Sidney Sussex College Chapel in Cambridge when it was refurbished by T.H. Lyon between 1911 and 1923. Hitch carved some figural roundels, a statue of St Francis and a statue of St George with the arms of Archbishop Machray supported by cherubs below. The figure of St Francis commemorated J.W. Reynolds who was killed in action in 1915. The non-figural carving in the Chapel was executed by Herbert Read of Exeter.

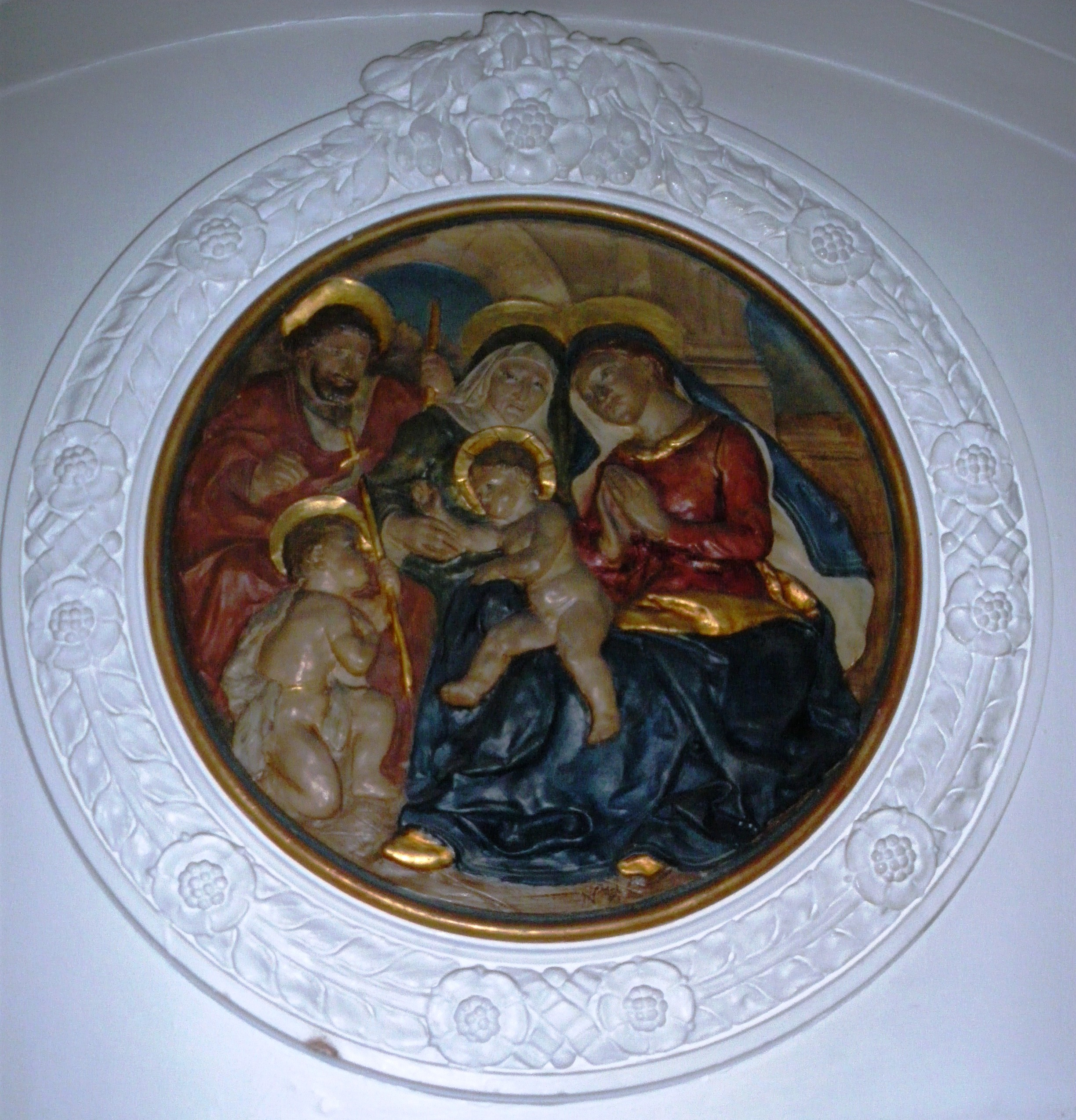
Roundel by Nathaniel Hitch-Sidney Sussex College Chapel

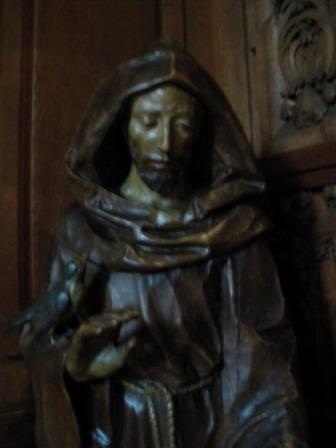
Close-up of St Francis. Sidney Sussex College Chapel

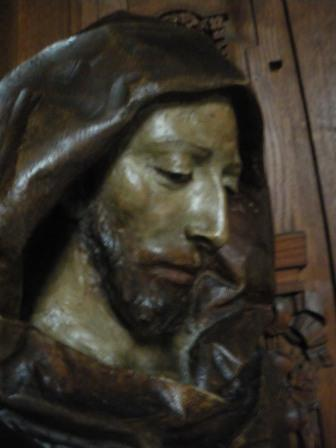
St Francis

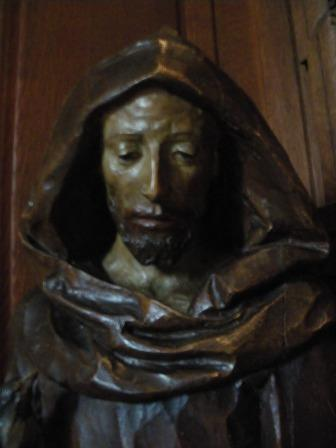
St Francis

=== Truro Cathedral ===
Truro Cathedral (the Cathedral Church of St Mary in Truro)) is thought by many to be John Loughborough Pearson’s finest work. Hitch did much of the sculptural work in the Cathedral including the figural work on the reredos, carvings above the north and south sedilia, two tympanum for the south porch, some sculptures for the inside of the Cathedral, including the "Transfiguration of Christ" above the South Door and carvings to the choir stalls. Below we see the central panel showing the crucifixion and in the gallery we see two views of the carvings above the sedilia, a study of part of the central panel, one of the tympanum above the south porch and some of the side panels.

The reredos was carved from Bath stone and erected in 1887. In the lower of the two central panels we see Christ on the cross. His mother stands on His left and Mary Magdalene kisses His feet. St John stands on His right and we then have some Hebrew Rabbis and a group of Roman soldiers. One soldier carries the "INRI" inscription which will be placed at the head of the cross.

In the central panel above, the same Christ sits in glory. On either side of these two central panels are columns each with eight pairs of adoring Angels in niches. On each side of these central panels and columns are a series of further richly canopied niches in which are various relief carvings each relating to a biblical episode and thus making the reredos an effective instrument of teaching. There are four such panels on each side. In the top left panel we have the sacrifice of Abel, the first recorded sacrifice in the bible. Next we have Noah and his family offering a sacrifice of thanksgiving from some of the animals who had survived the flood with them. In the panel below is the sacrifice of Isaac and in the final panel we see the story of the Passover.

In the four right hand panels we have the Tree of Life in the Garden of Eden being defended by an angel, Moses' brazen serpent, the Shewbread and the gathering of the First Fruits. Then in the panels on the far right of the sanctuary screen and above the sedilia we have the Gathering of the Manna, and water flowing from the rock at Kadesh after Moses had struck it with his rod. There are further carvings on the right and left hand side of the sanctuary screen, and above the sedilia.

In the outer tiers of niches we see some of the prophets: Jeremiah, Joel, Zechariah and Malachi, with all but Zechariah carrying his name, are in the outer tier on the left hand side and Daniel, Amos, Isaiah and Ezekiel feature in the outer tier on the right hand side. Then in the inner tiers we have the Saints and Martyrs of the Christian Church. We have on one side, Edmund, the Christian King of the East Angles, defeated by the Vikings; Cecilia, patron of music and virgin martyr; George, soldier and martyr; and Vincent of Spain with his gridiron and on the other side Catherine of Alexandria with her wheel; Polycarp; Lawrence; and Alban the Roman soldier who was the first British martyr. Polycarp wears the full Eucharistic robes of a Bishop- chasuble, dalmatic and tunicle.

In the lower niches are the twelve apostles, the founders of the Christian Church. On the far left hand side we have Philip, with Latin cross; Jude; James the Less; Matthew with his book; James the Great with his pilgrim hat and staff; Peter with his keys; John with the chalice of the last supper; Andrew with diagonal cross; Bartholomew with knife; then Simon; Thomas; and Matthias. Then in the lowest niches of the central pillars we have the four Evangelists, St Matthew, St Mark, St Luke and St John.

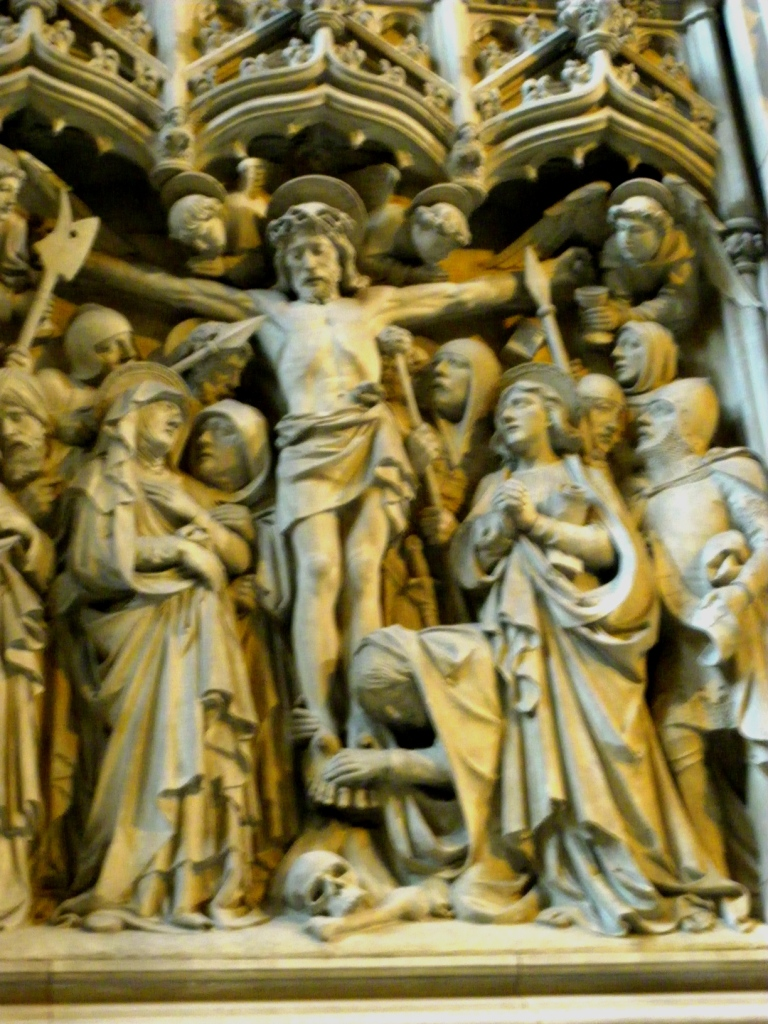
Part of Truro Cathedral reredos – central panel

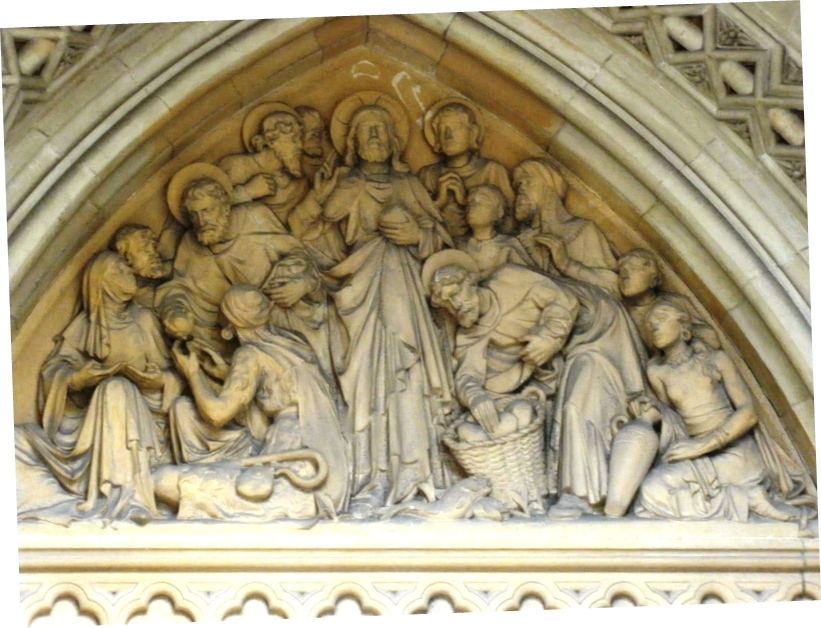
One of the tympanum at Truro Cathedral

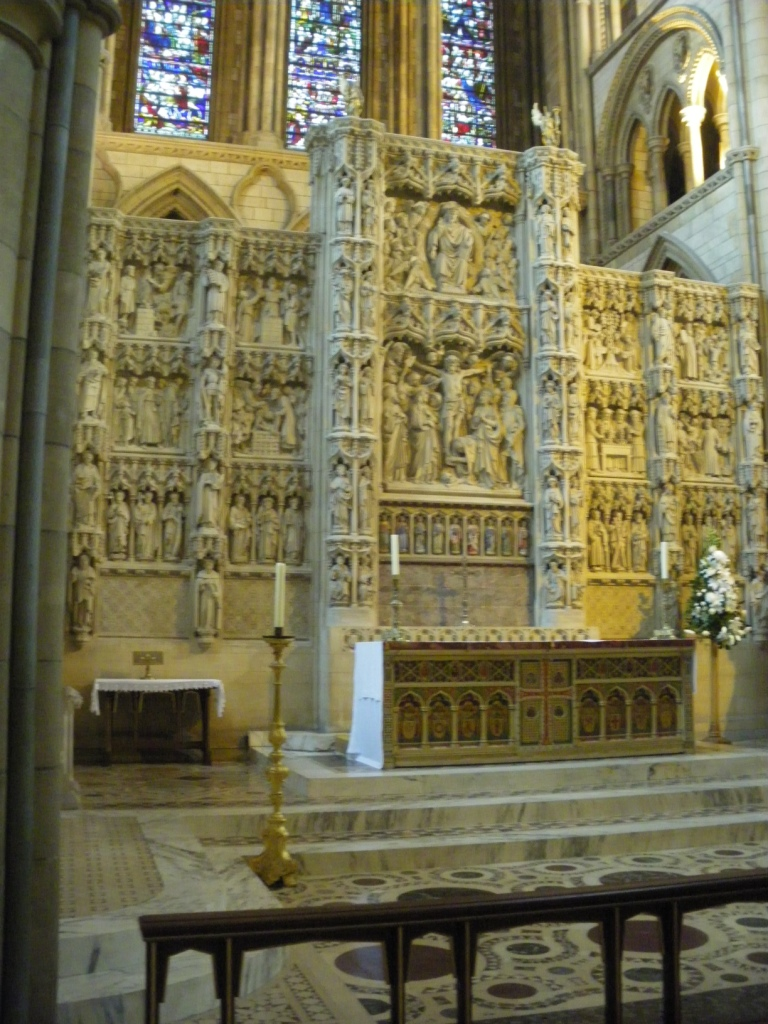
The full reredos

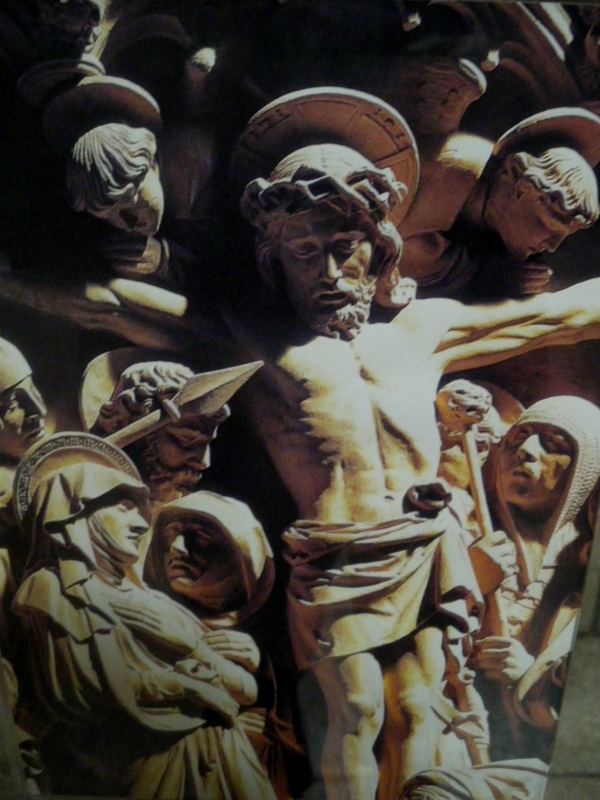
View of reredos

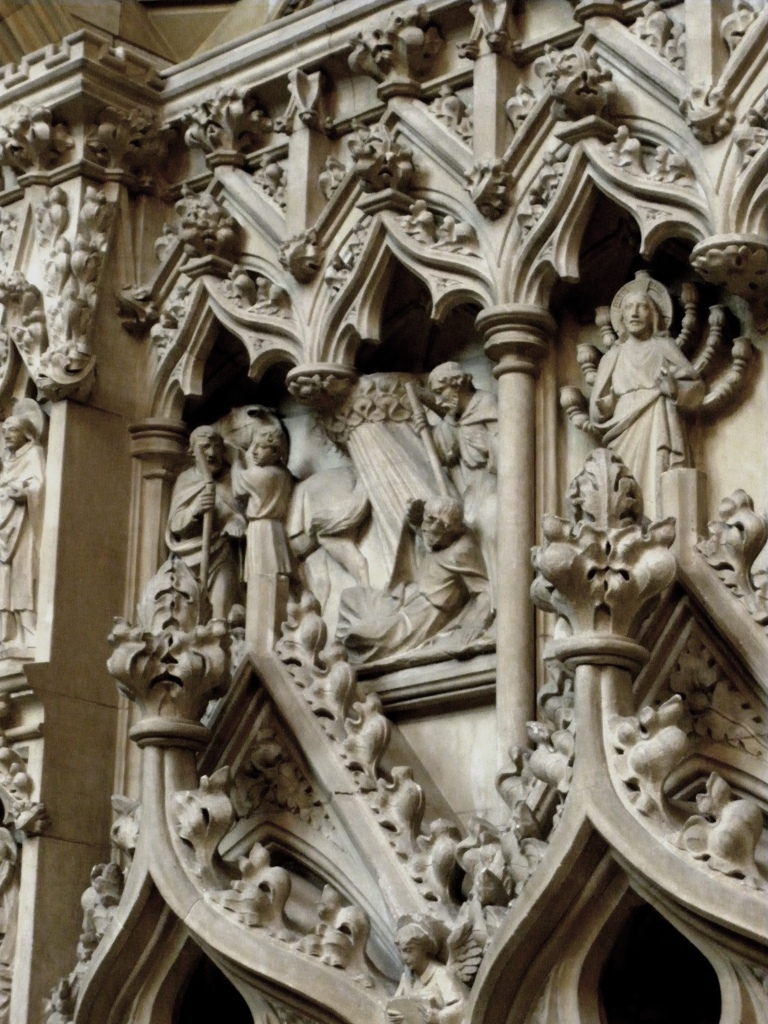
Part of carving above the sedilia in Truro Cathedral

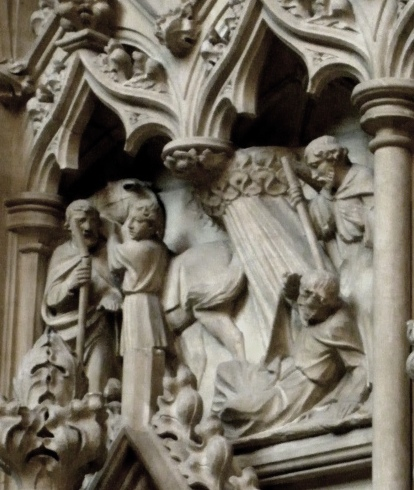
Another view of carving above the sedilia

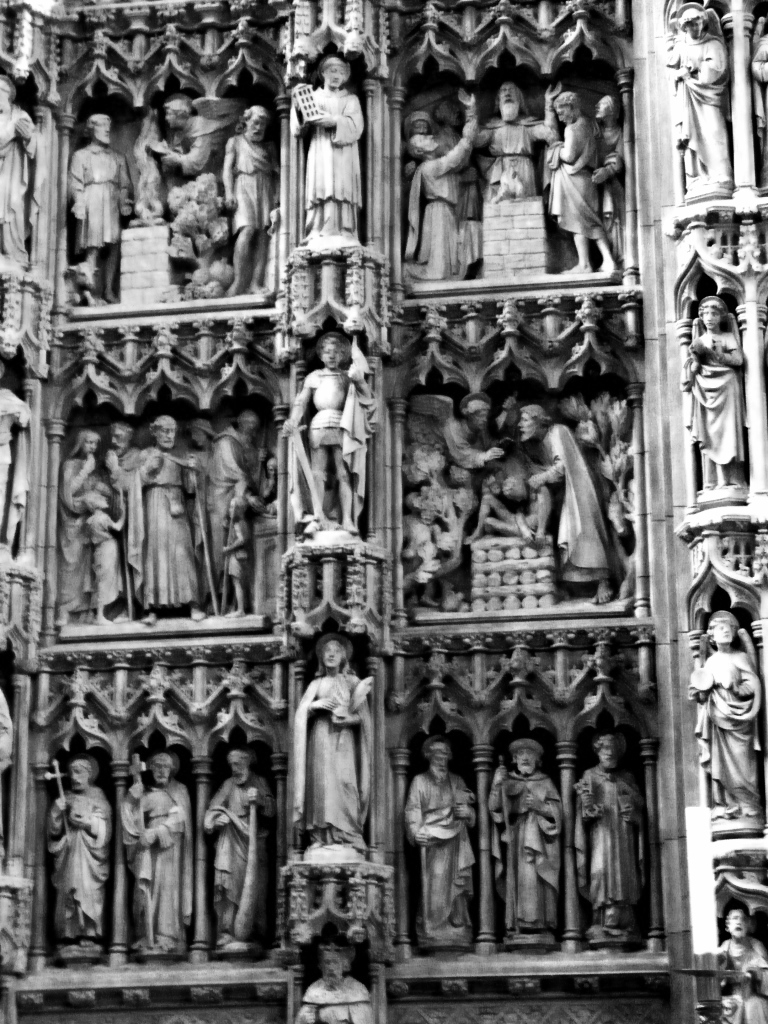
Another view of reredos – side panels

=== Westminster Abbey ===
In 1888 Hitch carved heraldic animals to staircase, carved statues, and other general carving.

On the exterior of the north transept of Westminster Abbey and as part of John Loughborough Pearson’s work at the abbey between 1888 and 1889 Hitch carved twenty-eight statues. These were of St Raphael, St Uriel, St Michael, St Gabriel, St Alban, St Aidan, Venerable Bede, Archbishop Theodore, St Augustine, Paulinus, St Benedict, St Dunstan, Roger Bacon, Robert Grosseteste, St Boniface, St Edmund, Matthew of Westminster, William Caxton, Walsinus, Edwin, King Richard, Anne of Bohemia, King Henry V, Catherine of Valois, Abbot Ware, Abbot Littleton, Dean Goodman and Williams the Lord Keeper. (Note: English Heritage/National Monument Records have black and white photographs of the clay models for these statues made by Hitch for Westminster Abbey. The records are found under reference HIT01.) In 1890 he carved statues to the north transept.

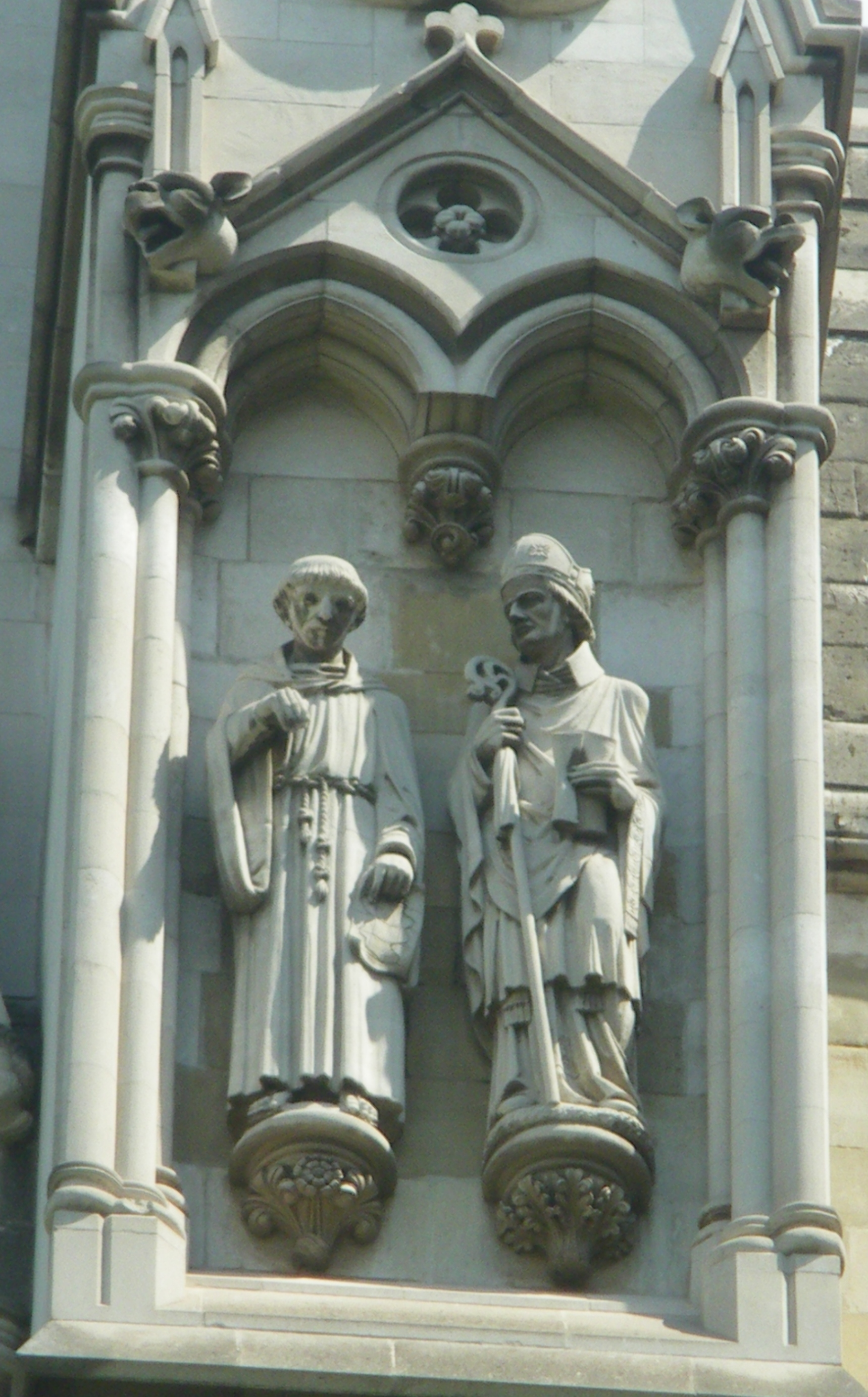
Roger Bacon and Robert Grosseteste

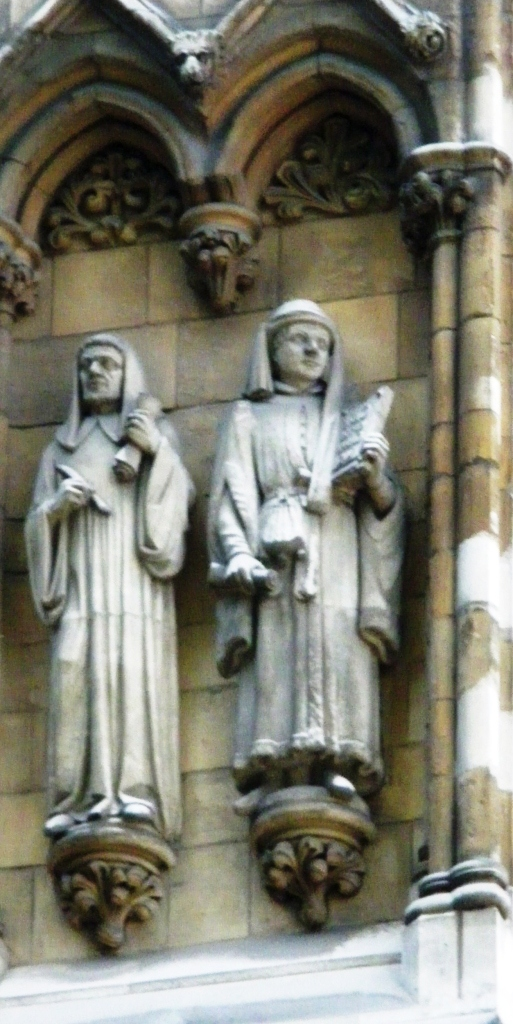
Matthew of Westminster and William Caxton

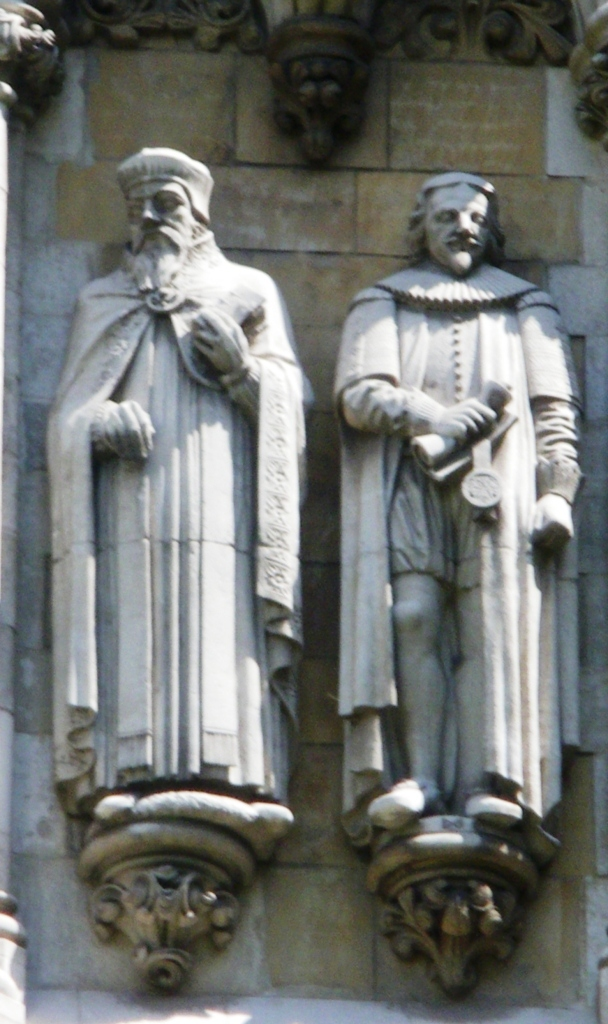
Dean Goodman and Williams, Lord Keeper

=== Works for Lord Astor ===
==== Two Temple Place ====
When Lord Astor commissioned John Loughborough Pearson to design Two Temple Place on the Embankment, Hitch was brought in to carve all the external embellishments to the stonework, except for those above the porch and for the interior carried out several commissions including the relief portraits in the Main Hall. Below is one of Hitch’s external carvings and then one of the relief portraits, this of Shakespeare's Juliet. Hitch also carved some very ornate bench-ends and a photograph of one of these is shown below as it highlights Hitch’s prowess as a wood carver. See Two Temple Place

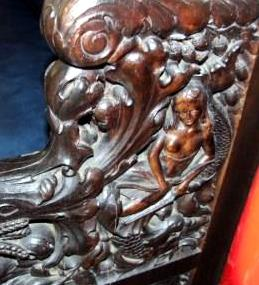
Close-up of Hitch carving on seat-end in Two Temple Place.

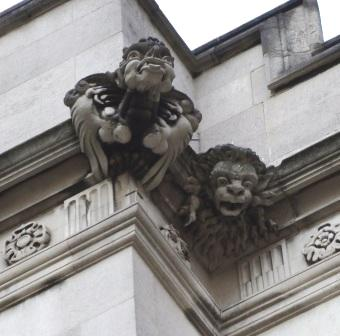
A Nathaniel Hitch "grotesque" on the exterior of Two Temple Place

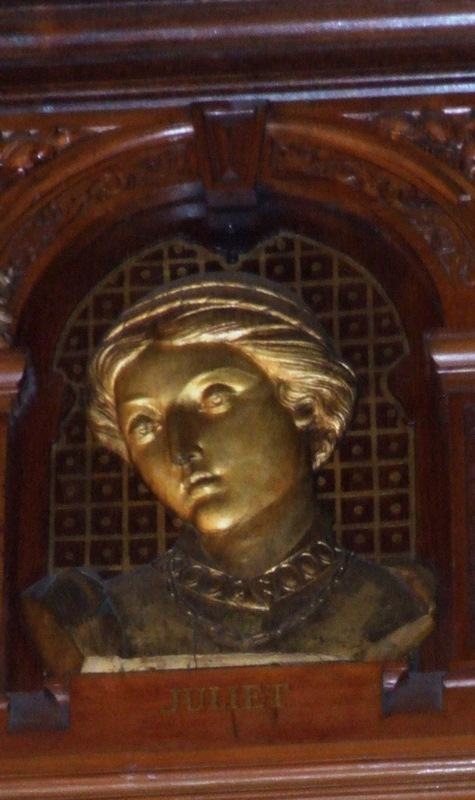
Juliet. Hitch carving in Two Temple Place

==== Octagan Temple family chapel, Cliveden ====
Lord Astor also commissioned a triptych altarpiece for the family chapel within the Octagon Temple at Cliveden. This was executed in the late 1890s. Frank Pearson was the supervising architect and Hitch carried out the carving. The whole altarpiece is uniformly gilded, with cabuchons of semi-precious stones in the frames. The subject is the Adoration and the two wings of the triptych feature more attendant merchants or possibly shepherds. The central panel is topped by carved angels and a central finial representing the Lamb, all gilded. The altarpiece is set on a base with three more reliefs of angels bearing shields of arms: a double panel flanked by single outer panels. The creation of the chapel and the conversion it involved of Leoni's Octagon Temple of 1735, may be attributed to the death in 1894 of Astor’s wife Mary, only a year after his purchase of the estate. The chapel is in the lower room with the floor removed above to create a small domed octagonal chapel. The first, second and third Viscounts Astor are buried there, with red marble commemorative slabs in the floor which is of Opus Alexandrinum.

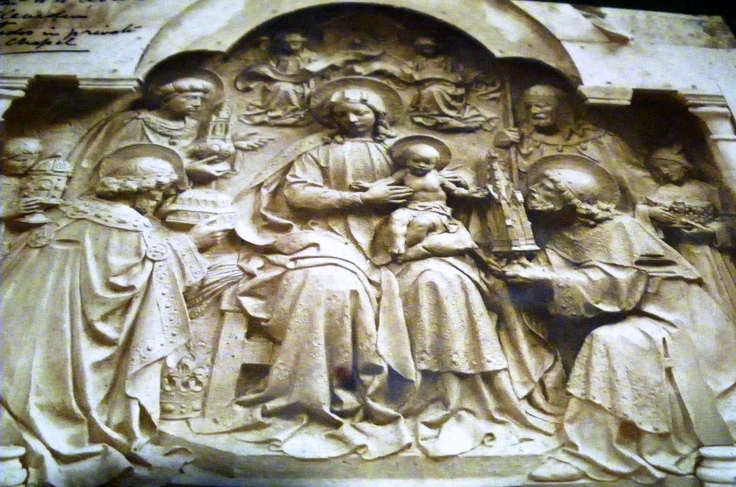
Cliveden Chapel. From a Hitch album in the Leeds archive

== Other works ==
Hitch worked with several architects who used him to carve altarpieces, church furniture and other decorative features on churches they were commissioned to design. During his career he worked with many architects, most notably John Loughborough Pearson, who provided Hitch with most of his commissions. His association with Pearson spanned at least the period between 1880 and 1912. Hitch also worked with William Doulas Caröe, a student of Pearson, as well as H. Fuller Clark, T.H. Lyon, Burke Downing and Paul Waterhouse.

The following are lists of additional works by Hitch, although it is not a complete listing. (Note: At the Henry Moore Institute Archive in Leeds there are several lists of works which were claimed to have been executed either by Nathaniel Hitch or his son Frederick Brook Hitch. In several instances however the works listed could not be traced/verified as by Hitch. There were also some photograph albums in which there were photographs taken by Hitch of works executed before they left his workshop for their final location. Most were tagged with a note as to the location of the work involved. Amongst these works were: 1. In one of the Hitch lists he included work on a triptych in teakwood for St Helen's Bishopsgate, this work executed to John Loughborough Pearson’s design in 1894. It has not been possible to conclusively link Hitch to the triptych in that church. In another list it was stated that Hitch had executed a war tablet for the same church but the church could not confirm that they had the tablet. 2. Hitch included in his listings sculpture for a reredos for St Matthias' Church in Northampton, this to a design by the architect M.H. Holding. Holding was indeed a Northampton-based architect, but there is no record of a St Matthias Church in Northampton or for that matter in Northamptonshire. A suspicion that Hitch might have meant St Matthew’s Church in Northampton drew a blank in that according to the church's own records the reredos in that church was by William Aumonier. However an article in the 'Northampton Mercury' of 27 September 1895 has been unearthed which states that "the reredos in St. Matthew's Church, Northampton is by Nathaniel Hitch" 3. For Cambridge University Library, Hitch referred to statues carved for the gateway leading to the quadrangle, these executed in 1888 and to John Loughborough Pearson’s design. These statues could not be traced. 4. There were photographs in one album of reliefs tagged as being for "Wadhurst" but it was not possible to confirm that these reliefs are still in existence. It was assumed that the reference was to Wadhurst Park in Sussex. 5. Other photographs were tagged as being for works in Clare College, Cambridge but the college were unable to locate and confirm the pieces in the photographs. One of the Hitch lists also included a reference to Hitch having done exterior carving for the Clare College (New Wing). 6. One Hitch list included a reredos for the Royal Navy barracks in Chatham. These barracks no longer exist and there is no trace of the reredos' current whereabouts. The same comments apply to a reredos for the Royal Navy barracks in Deal. See photograph below of the Chatham work. 7. Several photographs were marked "Beddington" . Neither St Mary’s, the Parish Church in Beddington, nor the local Beddington History Society nor the Surrey History Centre were able to identify the works photographed. As far as St Mary’s is concerned Hitch claimed to have carved a reredos, lectern, altar and some kneelers and there are such items in that church’s Carew Chapel. It is very likely that Hitch carved these but insufficient proof could be obtained to make a firm attribution. Below are two photographs of works from the Leeds papers both identified as for "Beddington Terrace" and designed by Joseph Clarke. 8. Another work listed was a reredos and sculpture for Mary Sumner Church, Westminster but the present residents of that building, which is no longer a church, were not aware of the whereabouts of these works. 9. There was a photograph of a reredos tagged "Woburn Ch" but enquiries to St Mary’s Parish Church in Woburn and to the Woburn Estate were unsuccessful in that the photograph was not recognised.)

=== Churches, cathedrals and other buildings ===
| Name | Year | Location | Architect | Comments | Image |
|---|---|---|---|---|---|
| St Mary's Convent | 1897 | Chiswick Outer London | C. Ford Whitcombe | Hitch carried out exterior and interior carving for St Mary’s Convent in Chiswick. | |
| St Mary’s Church | 1893 | Moulsoe Buckinghamshire | E. Swinfen-Harris | Hitch carved an oak triptych for St Mary’s Church in Moulsoe, Buckinghamshire. | |
| St Andrew’s Church | 1897 | Minterne Magna Dorset | A. H. Ryan Tenison | Hitch carved some oak bench ends for St Andrew’s Church. | |
| Atkinsons the perfumiers | | Old Bond Street London | | Hitch carried out some stone carving and architectural sculpture for this building. The building is now occupied by Salvatore Ferragamo. The tower above the premises houses London’s only carillon. | |
| The Church of All Saints | | Great Braxted Essex | | Hitch probably carried out some relief carving on oak panels for the reredos; there are six oak panels in all. Two panels feature angels holding scrolls and four panels feature saints. Two of the saints are St Peter and St Paul and the other two are most probably St Cedd and St Alban. All Saints' church has been in the Diocese of London (St Paul) and of Chelmsford (St Peter and St Cedd). The church also came under the Diocese of St Albans from 1877. Photographs shown here and in the gallery courtesy of Lorna Crick. | St Peter and St Paul |
| St Mary Magdalene Church | | Munster Square London | Paul Waterhouse | To the design of Paul Waterhouse, Hitch was involved in creating the aumbry in St Mary Magdalene Church, Munster Square, London. Hitch also carved the figures on the war memorial which stands in the grounds of the church. Photographs shown here The inscription on the war memorial reads "IN LOVING MEMORY/ OF ALL CONNECTED WITH THIS/ CHURCH WHO DIED IN THE WAR/ MCMXIV TO MCMXIX" — inscription | War Memorial St Mary Magdalene |
| St Mary of the Angels Church | 1902 | Worthing Sussex | F.A. Walters | Working with the Scottish architect F. A. Walters, Hitch executed an altar piece for St Mary of the Angels Church in Worthing, Sussex. This work was carried out in 1902. The church records of October 1902 state- "A beautiful Altar dedicated to the Holy Souls, as a memorial shrine to the deceased Catholic relatives of the Dowager Lady Loder was erected in the North Aisle at her Ladyship's sole cost. The design was by F. A. Walters, the stone work by Hatch (sic) of Vauxhall. Brasses by Hardman." Information courtesy of Mrs. A. D. Dowds. Photograph here and in gallery below courtesy of Antoinette33. | The altar piece at St Mary of the Angels Church. Worthing |
| St Mary the Virgin Church | 1894–96 | Kemsing Kent | W.F. Unsworth | Hitch helped restore the old Rood Screen and executed a new pulpit, this in 1894–96. A photograph of part of the pulpit is shown here courtesy of James Oakley. | Part of pulpit St Mary the Virgin, Kemsing. |
| Church of the Holy Cross | 1884 | Seend Wiltshire | A. J. Style | Hitch carved the pulpit for this church. It is carved from Caen stone with sculptured panels on each side of which and below the book-desk are small octagonal columns of polished Derbyshire fossil. The tracery and spandrels of the arches are inlaid with polished red marble. The design of the pulpit was intended by Style to stress the importance of two of the main requisites of a Christian life: faith and works. In the four panels of the pulpit the reliefs cover the visit of the Virgin Mary to her cousin Elizabeth, the presentation of Christ in the Temple, John the Baptist in the wilderness and St Luke the Evangelist. The Wiltshire & Swindon History Centre's records include a full description of the pulpit in a copy of the North Wilts Church Magazine of 1 August 1884. | |
| St John the Evangelist | 1892 | Lockerley Hampshire | J. Colson | Hitch carved a reredos in alabaster and marble whose theme was "The Last Supper". This church was designed in 1890 by the architect J. Colson. Photograph of reredos courtesy of James Pitkin. | "The Last Supper" |
| St Saviour’s Church | | Guildford Surrey | | Hitch carved the reredos for this church. St Saviour’s was founded in 1870 and was originally known as the 'tin tabernacle' before a new brick church was built to replace it. It was William Edward Peters, the first vicar of the parish (1890–1926) who can be credited with pushing for the present church to be built of mainly Bargate stone in the Gothic style and the church was finally dedicated on 7 October 1899 by the Bishop of Winchester, Dr Randall Davidson. The reredos, panelling and Holy Table were commissioned by the parishioners and friends to commemorate Peters' ministry. Here is a photograph of the central panel of the reredos and the tablet which explains its history can be seen in the gallery below. Photographs courtesy of George Dean. | The St Saviour’s Guildford reredos |
| The Lord Craven Mausoleum | | Hamstead Marshall | | Hitch did the sculptural work for the Lord Craven Mausoleum in Hamstead Marshall. | |
| St Erth | | St Erth Cornwall | | Hitch carved a reredos and several stall ends for this Cornish church. These are in the Lady Chapel known as the Trewinnard Chapel this named after the family who endowed the chapel. | |
| "Emmott" mausoleum | | Kensall Green | | Hitch did the figural work on the "Emmott" mausoleum in St Mary’s Catholic Cemetery, Kensall Green. A photograph of the relief above the mausoleum door is shown here. Hitch also did the sculptural work for the Wernher Mausoleum near Luton Hoo erected in 1912. | Relief on "Emmott" Mausoleum. |
| Dean Farrar | | Westminster | | Hitch sculpted the Memorial to Dean Farrar which can be seen in the porch of St Margaret’s Church by Westminster Abbey. | Memorial to Dean Farrar. |
| St Mary’s Church | 1919 | Walden Essex | | Hitch carved five statues for St Mary's which stand on plinths within the church. The statues of St Mary the Virgin to whom the church is dedicated and of St James the Patron Saint of Walden Abbey under whose jurisdiction the church originally came, are placed on plinths on the south wall of the church. These were erected in 1920. The statue of St James was modelled on a young officer killed in November 1918, Lt James Renault Saunders of the Coldstream Guards. The statue was given by his mother in his memory. Mrs Saunders had been married in the church in 1894. The Parish Magazine of February 1919 gave details of the statues to be commissioned and said: "We have obtained an estimate of the cost from Mr.Nathaniel Hitch, of Vauxhall, an eminent sculptor, who has done much similar work at Westminster Abbey, Truro Cathedral, Beverley Minster and All Saints Maldon. He has also sculptured the memorial to Archbishop Temple in Canterbury Cathedral." Three other statues stand on the north wall, these also dating from 1920. One is of St Nicholas and is placed above the site of the mediaeval chapel dedicated to him, another is of John Leche who was the vicar of the church from 1489 to 1521 and the third is of Leche’s sister, Dame Johanna Bradbury. It was John Leche and his sister who were primarily responsible for the rebuilding and extension of the church between 1450 and 1530. The statues were dedicated by the Bishop of Chelmsford on 13 November 1920. A photograph of the statue of the Virgin Mary is shown here courtesy of Mr & Mrs Hamish Walker. Hamish Walker is the Chief Guide and Archivist of St Mary’s. | Statue of St Mary and Virgin in St Mary’s Church, Saffron Walden |
| St Michael and All Angels Church | 1924 | Pirbright Surrey | A. Heron Ryan Tenison | To the design of the architect A. Heron Ryan Tenison, Hitch carved figures for a memorial rood beam for St Michael and All Angels Church in Pirbright, Surrey. This was erected in the church on Wednesday, 26 March 1924, and dedicated on the following Sunday morning by the donor, the Vicar. The rood beam bore the inscription- "To the Memory of Alice Anna, wife of Arthur Neild, Vicar of Pirbright, who entered into rest on St Philip and St James' Day, 1923." Some time after 1966 the rood beam was removed. The Calvary was hung over the chancel arch on chains and the flanking figures of the Virgin Mary and John the Baptist were placed on the beam corbels. See photograph of the carving of Jesus on the Cross now hanging over the chancel arch. Photograph and information courtesy R.J. Palmer | Pirbright |
| Katharine & All Saints Church | 1891 | Edington Wiltshire | | Hitch worked on the church's screen which was decorated with foliage, vines and pomegranate crests. | |
| St Paul's Church | | Chipperfield Hertfordshire | | Hitch carved an oak Reredos for St Paul's Church in Chipperfield, Hertfordshire. He executed this work between 1920 and 1936. A photograph of the central panel of the Reredos is shown below. St Paul's is a fine little church on the edge of Chipperfield Common. It has a splendid collection of kneelers. St Paul's was built in the 1830s and the architect was Thomas Talbot Bury. Hitch also carved the oak choir stalls and screen altar rails. | The reredos in St Paul’s Chipperfield |
| St Marwenne | | Marhamchurch Cornwall | | Hitch carved a calvary for the St Marwenne churchyard. | |
| St Peter’s Church | 1886 | Bentley Yorkshire | J. Cobb | For St Peter’s Church in Bentley, Yorkshire, and in 1886, Hitch worked for the architect J. Cobb and carved a figure of St Peter over the church porch. | |
| "Town Church" | | St Peter Port Guernsey | | For the "Town Church" as it is known in St Peter Port, Guernsey, Hitch worked on a reredos with St Cecilia carved in relief. A photograph is shown here courtesy Susan Ilie-Guernsey Ancestry. | St Cecilia in St Peter Port. |
| Holy Trinity Church | | Barrow-upon-Soar Leicestershire | | Hitch carved a reredos with the theme of the "Last Supper". Image courtesy Kathryn Timmons. Barrow Upon Soar Heritage Group. | Part of reredos. Holy Trinity Church. Barrow-upon-Soar. |
| St Philip’s Church | | Cheam Surrey | E. Swifen Harris | The architect E. Swifen Harris designed St Philip’s Church in Cheam which was built from 1894 to 1896. Hitch carved a triptych and wall screens for the church. This Anglican Church was closed due to structural problems and demolished in 1978. The present whereabouts of these works is unknown. | |
| Chapel of the Sacred Heart | | Leeds Yorkshire | S.K. Greenslade | Hitch carved the reredos for the Chapel of the Sacred Heart in St Anne’s Roman Catholic Cathedral in Leeds. The Cathedral and presbytery were designed by John Henry Eastwood but it was S.K. Greenslade who designed the Chapel of the Sacred Heart and used Hitch for the chapel’s sculpture in 1904. The marble altar incorporates an alabaster panel depicting the Last Supper and the reredos has the sacred heart in the centre with an image of Moses and the Crucifixion on either side. With the passage of time the alabaster panel has become very worn and it is very hard to make out the detail of Hitch’s carving. | Reredos in the Chapel of the Sacred Heart. |
| The Passmore Edwards Public Library | | St George-in-the-East Inner London | | For The St George-in-the-East Free Library in Cable Street in the East End of London, Hitch carved two reliefs entitled "Literature" and "Art". They were placed above the library entrance and were a gift from Passmore Edwards. The library was badly bombed in 1940 and the building was subsequently demolished. The two reliefs did not survived but photographs of them are shown here and in the gallery below, these taken by Hitch himself. The Henry Moore Institute archive, who hold the originals of these photographs, have kindly given permission for them to be reproduced. | Passmore Edwards Public Library. |
| All Saints' Church | | Saint Andrews Scotland | | Hitch carried out several commissions for All Saints'. This church was built early in the 20th Century. It was founded in 1903, gradually developed, and it was in 1939 that the rectory, the last building to be completed, was finished. Hitch’s best known work in the church is the hanging rood over the chancel steps which was a memorial to members of the Hull family but he also carved the wooden gates at the entrance to the chapel of the Blessed Sacrament. He also carved the reredos in that chapel and this features four figures connected with the Body of Christ: we see Nicodemus and Veronica on the left side and Joseph of Arimathea and Mary Magdalene on the right. Hitch also carved the case for the organ and the wooden gilded font cover, the carving representing a church with open doors. | |
| St John the Evangelist Church | 1910 | Bury Sussex | | Hitch carved some oak panelling with an intricate frieze of wheat and grapes for the chancel of this Sussex church. The chancel was rebuilt in the 19th century and Hitch also carved the reredos. There is also a fine carved altar, this the work of J. Philips. The altar and reredos were to the design of the vicar at the time, Revd John Sale (1887–1915). | Carving of wheat and grapes in St John the Evangelist Church, Bury, Sussex. |
| St Mary & St Michael’s Church | | Egremont Cumbria | Thomas Lewis Banks | Hitch carved figures for the church's oak reredos. Described as a "minor gem of Victorian Gothic architecture" this church was designed by the Cockermouth born architect Thomas Lewis Banks who practised out of Whitehaven. The builder was John Smith of Egremont. This replaced an earlier church which had a history going back over 750 years. The church has a fine font and pulpit as well as several notable stained glass windows. Parts of the church use rose-red Egremont sandstone taken from John Smith’s quarries at Ringingstones and Bankend. Photograph courtesy Richard Lee. Another is shown in the gallery also courtesy Richard Lee. | Reredos in Egremont. |
| Black Boy Inn | 1897 | Nottingham Nottinghamshire | Watson Fothergill | Hitch carved the statue of Samuel Brunts now at Brunts School in Mansfield. The original school was founded through a bequest of Samuel Brunts in 1709. Brunts was a very successful 18th century resident of Mansfield in Nottinghamshire and when he died he left monies for various charitable works. In 1887 the Brunts Charity commissioned Watson Fothergill to rebuild one of its properties, The Black Boy Inn on Long Row in Nottingham and in 1897 they had him draw up plans to further extend the hotel and as part of this extension Fothergill was asked to add a statue of Samuel Brunt. The Black Boy Inn was demolished in 1970 and the statue moved to the Mansfield School. Hitch also carved a relief of a black boy to act as a sign for the inn but the whereabouts of this sign is unknown. In the Henry Moore Institute archives' collection of papers lodged by the Hitch family one can see photographs of the Black Boy Inn sign which is a particularly fine piece of carving. A reproduction of this photograph is shown below by permission of the archive. | Black Boy Public House |
| Nottingham and Notts Banking Company building | 1882 | Nottingham Nottinghamshire | Watson Fothergill | Hitch carved several statues representing the trades of Nottingham for the architect Watson Fothergill. Fothergill had been commissioned to design a new building for the Nottingham and Notts Banking Company on the corner of Thurland Street and Pelham Street, Nottingham. The bank had just built a new HQ building on Thurland Street also designed by Fothergill and were left with a prime corner retail site. The plans for a shop were drawn up in 1882 and the shop was built shortly afterwards, Hitch’s statues being added at the top of columns on the shop’s frontage. The shop was demolished in the 1920s when the bank was extended. It is not known whether the statues survived and if they did where they are now. In the Henry Moore Institute archives' collection of papers lodged by the Hitch family one can see photographs of some of these statues. | |
| All Saints Church | 1907 | Maldon Essex | | A statue to commemorate Brythnoth was carved by Hitch in 1907 to commemorate the hero of the Battle of Maldon of 991 AD. This statue was placed on the south facing wall of All Saints Church in Maldon, Essex. | |
| St Peter’s Church | | Clapham Outer London | | This church has a wrought iron chancel (rood) screen with gates surmounted by a carved wooden rood and Nathaniel Hitch carved the figures on that Rood. A photograph is shown here this courtesy George Gray. The gates were designed by J.E.K. Cutts and made by Bainbridge Reynolds. The 14 Stations of the Cross were subscribed for by the congregation and placed in the church in March 1911. They were carved by a Bavarian artist in the Austrian Tyrol. The most striking feature of St Peter’s is the great reredos over the High Altar. This was completed by Easter of 1919 and was intended as a war memorial for the Great War. It is the work of C.E. Kempe. The central panel represents the Risen Lord whilst two Roman soldiers are shown sleeping below him. On the right side are the four Greek Doctors of the Church whilst on the left side stand St Peter and the other Mary, with the four Latin Doctors. | Hitch’s Rood in St Peter’s Clapham |
| St Andrew’s Church | 1930 | Cobham Surrey | | Hitch carved an oak reredos. He also completed some carved panelling for the church. This work was carried out circa 1930. In this instance the reference to this work in the Leeds archive did not make it clear as to whether the Cobham work was by Hitch or his son Frederick Brook Hitch. A photograph is shown below this courtesy David Cooke. | Cobham reredos |
| St Mary’s Church | 1891 | Calne Wiltshire | Pearson | Hitch carved a reredos in Corsham stone for the church. The figures on the reredos include various Wessex saints. Although the Leeds' archive papers indicate that this is in all probability a carving by Nathaniel Hitch it should be said that Wiltshire Archives could find no mention of Hitch in their records for St Mary’s. The reredos, shown in a photograph here, given courtesy Richard Moore and Alan Gray features the Crucifixion in the centre, the Nativity in the panel to the left and the Resurrection in the panel to the right. The original figures on the left of the Nativity were St Dunstan, St Edmund, King Alfred, St Aldhelm, St Birinus, St Oswald, St Gregory the Great and St Augustine. Between the Nativity panel and the Crucifixion panel we have from top to bottom, St John the Evangelist, St James and St Peter and then between the Crucifixion panel and the Resurrection panel we have, again from top to bottom: St Mary Magdalene, the Other Mary and the Blessed Virgin. To the right of the Resurrection panel were St Ethelreda, St Frideswide, St Witburger (Withburga), St Mildred, St Hilda, St Ethelburger (Ethelburga), St Catherine and St Agnes. In 1936 the position of the reredos was altered and the figures of St Gregory the Great, St Augustine, St Catherine and St Agnes were lost. | The St Mary’s Church, Calne reredos. |
| St Helen’s Church | Between 1883 and 1885 | Burghwallis Doncaster Yorkshire | John Loughborough Pearson | As part of Pearson's restoration work a new reredos was installed and Hitch did all the figural work for it. | |
| All Saints | 1919 | Great Braxted Essex | | Hitch carved various figures for the church reredos. | |
| St Leonard | 1985 | Tortworth Gloucestershire | William Douglas Caroe | Hitch carved a wooden reredos for this church. | |
| St Alban the Martyr | 1913 | Birmingham. Warwickshire | John Loughborough Pearson and Frank Loughborough Pearson | Rood beam and figures were carved by Hitch. The beam has a vine trail and a pelican included in the carving. | |
| All Saints' | | St Andrews. Fife. | Paul Waterhouse | Woodwork on the church's Hanging Rood, the chapel altarpiece and front canopy were all by Nathaniel Hitch. | |
| St Agnes & St Patrick | 1883 | Sefton Park. Liverpool | John Loughborough Pearson | Hitch carved the reredos and other works in this church, including Angels under canopies. | |
| St Margaret's Church | | Westminster. Inner London | | Hitch carved the memorial to Dean Farrar in the West Porch of this church which sits by Westminster Abbey. | |
| Chapel of the Sacred Heart | | Leeds Yorkshire | | Hitch carved a stone reredos in the north transept. | |
| All Hallows Barking | | City of London | John Loughborough Pearson | Hitch carved the three niche figures above the North porch of the church which is all that remains of John Loughborough Pearson’s restoration of All Hallows Barking; the North porch had survived the German bombing in 1940 when the church was almost totally destroyed. The church was restored after the war and is now All Hallows by The Tower/St Dunstan in the East. The three figures are: St Ethelburga who was the sister of Erkenwald the founder in the seventh century of Barking Abbey (the original church on this site had belonged to that Abbey), the Virgin and Child and Lancelot Andrewes. Andrewes had been Bishop of Winchester in the reign of James I and was baptised in All Hallows. | |
| All Saints' Church | 1913 | Gresford, Wrexham | William Douglas Caröe | Hitch carved a reredos showing the Crucifixion with Mary and John on either side of Christ. | |
| All Saints' Church | Unknown | Maidstone | John Loughborough Pearson, Frank Loughborough Pearson | It was firstly John Loughborough Pearson and then his son Frank who carried out restoration work for All Saints' in Maidstone. The church roofs were all renewed, as a memorial to Archdeacon Dealtry and Hitch carved twenty oak figures for the wall posts. The figures are placed above stone corbels. sixteen of these are in the chancel area and are figures from the New Testament including the twelve disciples and the other four are in the nave area and are figures from the Old Testament. Hitch also carved the triptych in the church’s Holy Name Chapel and in all probability did the figural work for the stone reredos. Photographs of the reredos and triptych are shown below courtesy Lionel Marchant. | |
| Anglican Church of St Matthias | 1892 | Burley, Leeds | John Loughborough Pearson | Hitch carved a pulpit in marble for the Anglican Church of St Matthias in Burley, Leeds. This was deemed unfit for use a few years ago and replaced. | |
| Bristol Cathedral | 1888 | | G.E. Street, John Loughborough Pearson, Frank Loughborough Pearson | John Loughborough Pearson completed the architect G.E. Street’s work on the Western Towers of Bristol Cathedral and Hitch carved several stone statues for those towers. From 1897 to 1899 this time completed after his father’s death by Frank Loughborough Pearson, a high altar reredos was installed and Hitch carried out the figural work for it. The figures on the reredos are biblical saints, bishops connected with the See of Bristol and local celebrities including William Canynges and Hannah Moore. Hitch also carved a credence in stone this just to the right of the reredos and left of the Sedilia. A photograph of the reredos is shown here. Hitch also carved a relief which can be seen on the wall behind the reredos and in the centre of a group of smaller figures. The photograph shown here is from Hitch’s Leeds album. Papers held at Bristol Archives also show that Hitch worked on the Bristol Cathedral choir screen in 1905 under Frank Loughborough Pearson’s direction. The photo is courtesy of Jenny Tabrum, Pittsburgh, Pennsylvania. | |
| Canterbury Cathedral | Unknown | | William Douglas Caröe | Hitch sculpted the bronze memorial to Archbishop Temple, which depicts Temple kneeling in his robes while holding a book in one hand. The figure of Temple is 7 ft high and is positioned under a canopy supported at each of four corners by angels. | |
| Catholic Apostatic Church | 1894 to 1896 | Maida Vale | John Loughborough Pearson | Hitch carved an alabaster altar and a statue of the Good Shepherd. | |
| Church of St Andrew and St Patrick | Unknown | Elveden, Suffolk | William Douglas Caröe | Hitch carved several figures for the reredos. The central panel of this reredos depicts Christ breaking bread before two disciples. Below is a photograph of St Matthew, one of the figures on the reredos. | St Matthew-one of Hitch’s carvings on the Elveden reredos. Courtesy Gillian Turner. |
| Church of St Barnabas | 1914 church built | Mitcham, Surrey | Burke Downing | Hitch carved a statue of St Barnabas that stands on the front wall of the church which was built in 1914. | Statue of St Barnabas. Church of St Barnabas, Mitcham, Surrey. Courtesy Father Joabe Cavalcanti. |
| Great Ormond Street Children's Hospital | 1910 | Great Ormond Street. London | John Loughborough Pearson | Memorial Fountain | |
| Church of St George the Martyr | Unknown | Adelaide in Australia | T.H. Lyon | Hitch carved 1) the Great War Memorial which stands just outside the church, 2) the statues of the Virgin Mary and St George at the foot of the chancel facing the nave and 3) the statue of St Michael in St Michael’s Chapel. The photograph is of the head of St George from the statue facing the nave as mentioned above. There are some other works in the church which have been attributed to Hitch, namely a statue of St Anthony of Padua, the triptych in the Lady Chapel, the great Rood in the church, a life-size crucifix, the font carvings of St Angus and St Alban. | |
| Church of St George’s | 1895 approximately | Deal, Kent | Burke Downing | Hitch executed carvings on a Mayor’s chair. | |
| Church of St John the Baptist | 1912 church completed | West Byfleet near Woking | William Douglas Caröe | Hitch carved the font, which weighs two and a half tons, in Hopton Wood Stone. The font is hexagonal in form and made of four blocks each with an outline of a cup on each side. The inscription reads "Jesus Baptizaratus Erat" - Jesus was Baptized. | |
| Church of St. Milburga | Unknown | Llanfilo in Powys | William Douglas Caröe | Hitch carved the figures of Peter, James, the Virgin and Child, Luke and Paul for a late fifteenth /early sixteenth century carved screen at Caröe was making. Hitch also worked on the Rood. | |
| Headingley Church | 1886 | Leeds | John Loughborough Pearson | Pulpit with sculpture | |
| Holy Trinity Church | 1892 | Ayr, Scotland | John Loughborough Pearson | This church is the only complete example of John Loughborough Pearson’s work in Scotland and the church was built in stages between 1888 and 1900. Hitch carved the pulpit in 1892. The pulpit is carved from Caen (Normandy) stone. It shows the twelve apostles, with Jesus as the Good Shepherd in the centre and St John the Baptist (patron saint of Ayr) and St Paul on either side. Photograph shown courtesy Archie Thom Director of Music. Holy Trinity Church. Ayr. | |
| Huyton United Reformed Church | 1889–90 | Huyton near Liverpool | William Douglas Caröe | Hitch carved the stone pulpit in the church. | |
| Lincoln Cathedral | 1893 | Lincoln. Lincolnshire | John Loughborough Pearson | Hitch updated the old choir stalls and bishop's throne with 67 statuettes made of oak. He also made quatrefoil panels in sets of three in the choir stalls. Amongst those represented by the statues in the choir stall area are St Mark, St James, St George, the Venerable Bede, St Thomas, St Nicholas, St Lawrence, St Edward, St Augustine, St Catherine, St Thomas and St Lucy. In 1899 Hitch carved further statues for the choir stalls, on this occasion working with Sir. A.W. Blomfield. | |
| St Augustine’s Church | 1891 | Kilburn | John Loughborough Pearson | Hitch worked on the mahogany reredos in the St Michael’s Chapel in St Augustine’s Church in Kilburn. The theme here is angels, and the reredos and figures in the Apse depict St John’s vision of heaven in the Book of Revelation. The photograph shows the left hand side of the reredos. | |
| St. Bartholomew's Church | 1885 | Thurstaston in the Wirral | John Loughborough Pearson | Hitch created a reredos in alabaster and various other sculptures. | |
| St Helen’s Church | Unknown | Sefton | William Douglas Caröe | Hitch to carve the oak reredos in the Lady Chapel, donated by Lady Sefton in memory her daughter. | St Helen's reredos, Sefton |
| St. Mark's | 1906, 1917, 1926 | Barnet Vale | John Loughborough Pearson | Hitch carved the three porch sculptures at St. Mark's in Barnet Vale. When the porch at St. Mark's was dedicated in 1909 only the central statue of the Good Shepherd was in place, said to have been adapted from a statue in Florence. The statue of St. Mark was added in 1917 in memory of Norman Child who had fallen in the Great War. The final statue, that on the right, was to have been of St. John the Baptist, patron of St. Mark's' mother church, but some years later, in 1926, St. Alban was chosen instead, and his statue was erected in memory of Cyril Catford who also fell in the Great War. | |
| St Mary and All Saints' Church | Unknown | Bingham | William Douglas Caröe | Hitch carved a wooden statuette of St George for the top of the church's lectern. | |
| St. Mary the Virgin and St. Chad's Church | 1911 | Brewood, Staffordshire | William Douglas Caröe | Hitch carved a stone reredos. | |
| St Mary the Virgin’s church | 1928 | Brecon, Powys | William Douglas Caröe | Hitch did figural work for a reredos. | |
| St Mary the Virgin church | 1911 | Great Chart, Kent | John Loughborough Pearson | Hitch carved a reredos that was given to the church in 1912 in memory of Colonel John Leslie Toke of Bucksford Manor who had been the rector’s warden from 1895 to 1903. The reredos consists of one main section and two side panels. The central panel depicts Christ blessing children and groups on the left side represent Hope, Charity and Faith and on the right side Justice, Fortitude and Prudence. Beyond are figures of the Virgin Mary on the left and St Luke on the right. The reredos is in Portland stone. | |
| St Mary’s and All Saints' Church | 1914 dedicated | Bradley, Staffordshire | William Douglas Caröe | Hitch completed carvings on a stone chancel screen. Photograph courtesy David Beech/ William Wilkinson | |
| St Mary’s Church | Unknown | Ashford, Kent | John Loughborough Pearson | Hitch carried out carvings on the pulpit. See photograph below. The pulpit dates from 1897 and is in polished Hopton Wood Stone. It has columns in Devonshire marble. The pulpit depicts Christ the Good Shepherd flanked by the four evangelists. In Hitch’s list of works held at the Henry Moore Institute Archive in Leeds, this church is described as "Ashford Old Church". Photograph courtesy Dr John Salmon. | |
| St Mary’s Church | 1925 | Gillingham, Dorset | Burke Downing | Hitch worked on the reredos of the theme of the Adoration of the Infant Saviour. | Gillingham reredos. St Mary's Church. Courtesy Teresa Goatham. |
| St Mary’s | 1892 | Laverstoke | John Loughborough Pearson | Hitch did the figural work for a wooden triptych in St Mary’s, Laverstoke. Photograph below courtesy Brenda Bond. | Laverstoke triptych. |
| St Mary’s Church | 1893 | Pembroke | John Loughborough Pearson | Hitch did the carving on the Bath stone reredos. The central feature of the reredos was Christ in Majesty. | |
| St Matthew’s Church | 1916 | Douglas on the Isle of Man | John Loughborough Pearson | Hitch carved the reredos in the form of a triptych, carved in wood, decorated in gesso, gilded and painted. It is 13 feet high from the Altar step to the top of the cornice, and 14 feet across the wings. The design is intended to illustrate the "Doctrine of the Incarnation" and the central subject consists of a representation of the Adoration of the Magi; carved in high relief. In the centre is the Virgin Mother, seated under a curtained canopy, with the Holy Child on her knee, and, grouped around, the three kings in attitudes of adoration, presenting their gifts, with Saint Joseph in the background. In the panels on either side are soldiers and servants attending the Kings. In the top panel is the figure of our Lord seated in Majesty, with hands extended in blessing, and on either side angels with censers. On the wings are figures executed in gesso. The lower panel represents St. Matthew, in whose honour the Church is dedicated, then St Clement, St. Ignatius, and St. Polycarp, the three sub-apostolic Fathers. The predella is decorated in gesso work, with four angels holding shields bearing the instruments of the Passion on a richly decorated background. On the moulded base is the text, "Et incarnatus est de Sancto Spiritu". In an article in the "Isle of Man Examiner" dated 11 March 1916 the reredos was described as "one of the most beautiful works of ecclesiastical art in the Island". | |
| St Michael and All Angels Church | Unknown | Headingley, Leeds | John Loughborough Pearson | For St Michael and All Angels Church, Hitch carved some relief sculptures on the John Loughborough Pearson designed pulpit. The theme of the carvings is preaching and teaching. The four large panels show, from left to right: St John the Baptist in the wilderness, Jesus delivering the Sermon on the Mount, St Peter preaching to the multitude on the day of Pentecost (with the flames of the Holy Spirit on the figures' heads) and St Paul, probably at Athens. Alternating with these are five long narrow niches containing single figures. These are Old Testament figures holding scrolls with their names and above are the Evangelists (the writers of the four Gospels), and St Paul (with a sword). The pulpit is made of marble and alabaster. Hitch also carved some ornate bench ends for the church Choir Stalls. There are four choir stalls involved and therefore eight carvings in total. On the Lady Chapel side and left to right, the carvings represent the Nativity, the presentation of Jesus in the temple (Luke ch.2), the baptism of Jesus and Jacob wrestling with the angel (Genesis ch.32). On the organ side we have, and again left to right, the meeting of Abraham and Melchizedeck (Genesis ch.14), the Annunciation (Gabriel appearing to the Virgin Mary.(Luke ch.1), Adam and Eve (Genesis ch.3) and Jesus' charge to Peter "Feed my sheep" (John ch.21). | |
| St. Nicholas Church | 1884 | Chiswick, London | John Loughborough Pearson | Hitch carved the panels on the font and also sculpted a statue of St Nicholas. Photo shown courtesy Peter Hammond. | |
| St Ninian's Cathedral | 1901 | Perth, Scotland | John Loughborough Pearson | Hitch carved the pulpit which depicts St Cuthbert holding the head of King Oswald, St Kentigern preaching to the workers, St Patrick preaching to Irish princesses and St Columba, seen with King Brude. Photograph below courtesy Margaret Lye. | |
| St Paul’s Church | 1895 | Daybrook, Nottingham | John Loughborough Pearson | Hitch carved a representation of "The Last Supper" on an alabaster reredos and also did some work on the Lady Seely Monument, although Sir Thomas Brock worked on the main sculpture of Lady Seely. For the same church Hitch worked on the pulpit and font in 1897. Some photographs are shown here, firstly of the reredos, then the pulpit. The pulpit has three carved panels at the angles of which are carved canopied figures of Saints Peter, Paul and John. Hitch also carved the figures of St Peter and St Paul on the church exterior. The octagonal font is in Mansfield stone and the figures carved on it represent Truth, Faith, Hope, Charity, Courage, Industry and Purity. Hitch also carved several heads on the arches around the sanctuary and Lady Chapel. The photo is courtesy Olive R. Taylor. | |
| St Peter and St Paul's Church | 1913 | Saltwood, Kent | William Douglas Caröe | Hitch worked on an organ case for this church. Since the organ was restored as part of the 1953 Coronation celebrations it is difficult to determine the nature of the work. Canterbury Cathedral Archives include minutes of a 1913 committee meeting when the organ case was mentioned with W.D. Caröe's, the likely design, involvement. | |
| St Peter’s Cathedral | Unknown | Adelaide | T.H. Lyon | Hitch carved all the cathedral's reredos figures, which consists of five panels around which are eighteen niches holding coloured and gilded figures. The central panel depicts Christ Reigning in Glory and below this are four panels each one covering an incident in St Peter’s life. The statues in the niches at the top of the reredos represent four Archangels: St Uriel, St Michael, St Gabriel and St Raphael. Then there are statues of the Saints: George, Patrick, Andrew and David and then Edward The Confessor, The Venerable Bede and St Augustine of Canterbury. Also featured are Martha of Bethany, Catherine of Alexandria, Barbara, Margaret of Antioch, St Agnes, the teenaged Virgin Mary with her mother Anne, and the Virgin Mary and with the infant Jesus. | |
| St Peter’s Church | 1931 | Budleigh Salterton | Burke Downing | Hitch carved a reredos in Ancaster stone, which can be seen in the east end of the church. The central panel of the reredos shows the Good Shepherd and on either side relief panels feature the "Annunciation" and "Nativity." Four central shields carry the symbols of the evangelists. The reredos was dedicated by the Bishop of Crediton in July 1931. | View of reredos in St Peter’s, Budleigh Salterton. Courtesy Brian Hawkes. |
| St Peter’s Home | 1899 | Woking | John Loughborough Pearson | Hitch carved alabaster sculptures for the altar and a gable rood for the chapel of St. Peter's. This was a convent but is now the Church of the Holy Cross, Maybury. From the Woking History Society Newsletter 240 (Summer 2011): "For the magnificent high altar and baldacchino Frank Pearson adapted his father’s design for St Augustine’s (Kilburn) but on a more lavish scale. Originally dedicated to St Peter and inscribed to the memory of Rosamira Lancaster, it is made of oyster and pink alabaster and marble. The red marble columns supporting the baldacchino were specially imported to England for the first time from the Atlas Mountains in North Africa. Most of the carving, notably the panels depicting the life of Christ on the altar and the eight saints on the baldacchino were executed by Nathaniel Hitch. He was one of the finest Victorian craftsmen, and also made the three-figure rood on the east end of the roof overlooking Maybury." | |
| Peterborough Cathedral | 1890, 1891 | | John Loughborough Pearson | Hitch carved the new pulpit with sculptured panels and figures in Peterborough Cathedral in 1890. The next year he carved figures and panels for choir stalls. | |
| Rochester Cathedral | 1889 | Rochester. Kent | John Loughborough Pearson | Hitch carved several figures in niches for the choir screen. | |
| Washington Cathedral | 1920 unveiled | | William Douglas Caröe | Hitch completed a memorial to Bishop Henry Yates Satterlee which was unveiled in 1920. Hitch executed Caröe’s design for the sarcophagus and ambon. Satterlee’s life-sized figure lies recumbent and attired in his Episcopal robes. The angels featured symbolize the Lambeth Quadrilateral of which Satterlee was one of the leading exponents. Around the figure and at the top of the base are inscribed important dates in his life and the words "Holy, Holy, Holy, Lord God of Hosts; Heaven and Earth are full of Thy Glory, Glory be to Thee, O Lord Most High." words which Satterlee spoke just before his death. On the base is carved an inscription to his wife Jane Lawrence Satterlee, who lies buried beside him. | |
| Washington Cathedral | 1929 consecrated | | William Douglas Caröe | Hitch completed Bishop Harding’s life-sized figure which is attired in his Episcopal robes and lies recumbent. He is attended by angels and his faithful bulldog who keeps watch. At the base are inscribed important dates of his life and inscriptions to his wife Justine Prindle Harding and his son Douglas Harding. | |
| Westminster Abbey | 1901 inserted | | William Douglas Caröe | Hitch worked on the memorial brass to John Loughborough Pearson, who was for several years the "Architect Surveyor of the Fabric" at the Abbey. He was buried in the centre part of the nave of the Abbey, next to his predecessor in the role, Sir George Gilbert Scott. A depiction of the Crucifixion appears at the top of a long stemmed support and base with the words "Sustinuit et Abstinuit" (sustain and abstain) either side of the stem. | |
| Westminster Hall | 1888 | | John Loughborough Pearson | As part of a restoration project for Westminster Hall, Hitch carved some heraldic animals on the staircase in the Great Hall, sculpted some statues in the turret on the west end of the Hall, and made other general carvings inside and outside the Hall. | |
| Wells Cathedral | 1897 | Wells | John Loughborough Pearson | Pearson helped design the monument to Bishop Lord Arthur Hervey in Wells Cathedral. The sculptured figure of the bishop was by Sir Thomas Brock but the Wells Cathedral Archives have a document which shows that Pearson designed the sarcophagus and was assisted by Hitch (one assumes with the carving although this is not entirely clear as that document says Hitch was "paid £250 for the design") | |
| Wakefield Cathedral | | Wakefield Yorkshire | John Loughborough Pearson | Hitch carved a sedilia and altar table for Wakefield Cathedral and whilst the papers held by the Henry Moore Institute in Leeds confirmed that Hitch carried out this work, the Cathedral Archives and those of the Wakefield Archives did not in fact mention Hitch by name. | |

=== War memorials ===
| Name | Year | Location | Architect | Comments | Image |
|---|---|---|---|---|---|
| St Mary the Virgin Church | | Uttoxeter | | Hitch worked on a reredos to commemorate those lost in the Great War. The inscription reads "GREATER LOVE/ HATH/ NO MAN THAN THIS/ THAT A MAN/ LAY DOWN HIS LIFE FOR HIS FRIENDS" — inscription. The reredos comprises a wall-mounted alabaster plaque made up of five panels. The central panel carries a relief carving of the crucifixion surmounted by angel figures in relief. Each of the five panels is surmounted by ornate finials. | |
| All Saints' Church | 1920 | Steep Hampshire | | Hitch worked on the war memorial in All Saints' Church in Steep, Hampshire. Included amongst the names on this memorial is that of the poet Edward Thomas who lived at Steep prior to enlisting in the Army. See photograph courtesy Tony Struthers. | War Memorial in All Saints' Church, Steep |
| Sefton and District WW1 memorial | | Sefton Yorkshire | | Hitch worked on this memorial which takes the form of a stone calvary and stands at the junction of Bridges Road and Sefton Mill Road in Sefton Village. At the base of Hitch’s carving is the inscription. "TO THE IMPERISHABLE MEMORY OF THE MEN OF SEFTON AND DISTRICT WHO FOUGHT AND DIED FOR ENGLAND IN THE GREAT WAR 1914-1919 AROUND BASE:(NAMES).” Inscription | |
| Beacon Hill | | Hindhead Surrey | Bodley and Hare | Hitch did the sculptural work on the war memorial on Beacon Hill, Hindhead, south west Surrey. The memorial is a Doulting stone gable crucifix on a plinth and a two-stepped hexagonal base. It stands on a paved area in the churchyard of St Alban’s Church. The dedication reads "To the glory of god and in loving memory of the men of this parish and others who died for their country in the two world wars and in thanksgiving for those who served and were kept safe this cross was erected by parishioners and friends" — inscription The memorial was designed by Mr CG Hare of Messrs Bodley and Hare of Lincoln’s Inn Fields, London. It was dedicated on 14 December 1919. | |
| Bradfield St George Parish Church | 1920 | Bradfield St George. Suffolk | John Loughborough Pearson | Hitch carved statues of St George and St Alban which stand in niches in the church reredos on either side of a depiction of the Nativity and serve as a war memorial to remember those 19 local men who died in The Great War. It was unveiled on 30 July 1920 by the Venerable G. Hodges. The inscription reads- "To the Glory of God, the reredos is dedicated/In memory of those who gave their lives in the Great War/1914-1919/(Names)/ Rest eternal grant to them O Lord/And let light perpetual shine upon them — Inscription. Photograph of St. George shown courtesy of Simon Mann. | |
| Church of St Barnabus and St James | 1921 | Walthamstow | William Douglas Caröe | Hitch carved a Hanging Rood which serves as a memorial to those 119 men who died in The Great War. Unveiled by Lt General Sir Francis Lloyd on 19 March 1921. The Hanging Rood takes the form of the crucifixion. Has attached to it a wooden board with names of the 119 dead carved in three columns. The board has ornate tracery carving along its top. The Rood depicts the scene at Calvary with the two Marys standing either side and four relief carvings of Saints, one at each end of the Cross. | |
| Church of St Margaret | 1913 | Bodelwyddan. Clwyd. | William Douglas Caröe | As part of a memorial to those Bodelwyddan parishioners who lost their lives in the Great War, Hitch carved a "Madonna and Child" in the Lady Chapel. | |
| Dane John Park | 1904 | Canterbury, Kent | William Douglas Caröe | Hitch carried out the sculptural work on the Dane John Park memorial, an obelisk which rises from a panelled base. It was erected in memory of the Buffs and Royal East Kent Imperial Yeomanry’s service in the Boer War (1899–1902). The letter cutting was done by Eric Gill. There are 234 names on three sides of the memorial. The front supports a pedestal with the figure of a soldier in Boer War campaign dress. The soldier stands at ease and wears a slouch hat and bandolier. There are regimental badges on three faces and on the front face and behind the soldier is a wreath. The Right Honourable Earl Roberts carried out the unveiling on 24 May 1904. The inscription reads- "To the glorious memory and in grateful/remembrance of the devoted and heroic service/of the Officers Non Commissioned Officers and Men of/The Buffs- East Kent Regiment/and of the/Imperial Yeomanry of East Kent/who gave their lives in the Country's cause/ during the war in South Africa 1899-1902/this memorial has been erected by their com/-rades in arms belonging to East Kent Regiments/and by their sorrowing friends in the County (sides and reverse (names) — inscription | |
| Dulwich College War Memorial | Unknown | Dulwich. Outer London | Caröe | Hitch carried out the carving representing Jesus on the Cross. A full description of the memorial can be seen in the Dulwich Society Journal Winter 2010 issue which is available on the Dulwich Society's website. | |
| Durham Cathedral | 1923 (Date dedication) | Durham. County Durham | William Douglas Caröe | Hitch carved the figure of St George slaying the Dragon at the top of the wooden screen in the Chapel of the Durham Light Infantry in Durham Cathedral. The depiction of St George and the Dragon is flanked by St Cuthbert and St Oswald; It is unknown if Hitch carved the figures of St Cuthbert and St Oswald. The screen was designed by Caroe. The screen was originally dedicated to the men of the Durham Light Infantry who lost their lives in the Great War and was later rededicated to all Durham Light Infantry men who died in action from 1758 to 1968. | St George slays the dragon, Durham Cathedral. Courtesy of the Chapter of Durham Cathedral & Marion Whyte. |
| Hildenborough War Memorial | 1920 unveiled | Hildenborough, Kent | Henry Philip Burke Downing | Nathaniel Hitch carved a relief sculpture of Christ on the Cross flanked by two angels for the Hildenborough War Memorial. This took the form of a two-stepped base surmounted by a plinth, shaft and cross. The memorial was unveiled on 5 October 1920. There are 37 names from World War I and 16 for World War II inscribed on the memorial. | |
| Merton Park War Memorial | 1920–21 | Merton | Henry Philip Burke Downing | The memorial, unveiled on 21 September 1921, is made from Weldon stone. It features a Cross and includes Hitch’s carving of a figure of "Christ in Majesty" in the centre of the arms of the cross. The inscriptions are "Lift up your Hearts" and "In Memory of the Men of Merton who gave their lives in the War 1914-1918." The words "and in the War 1939-45" were added later. | |
| Old Gore War Memorial | Unknown | Hereford and Worcester | None identified | Hitch carved the figure of Jesus Christ on the war memorial in remembrance of the Old Gore and district men who died in World War I. The inscription reads- To the undying memory of Hereford men/of this district who fell in the Great War 1914-1918/These were his servant, in his steps they trod/Following through death the martyred Son of God/Victor he rose, Victorious too shall rise/ They who have drunk the cup of sacrifice/(names) — inscription | |
| Sefton and District WW1 memorial | Unknown | Sefton. Liverpool | William Douglas Caröe | Hitch carried out the carving of a stone calvary dedicated to the men of Sefton and District who died in World War I. It stands at the junction of Bridges Road and Sefton Mill Road in Sefton Village. At the base of Hitch’s carving is the inscription. | |
| St Cuthbert’s Church | 1899 | Darlington | William Douglas Caroe | Hitch carved a memorial to Lieutenant General Sir Henry Marsham Havelock-Allan (1830–1897) who was killed whilst in action in the Kyber Pass area. | |
| St Dunstan’s Parish Church | Unknown | Cranbrook, Kent | William Douglas Caröe | This South African War (1900–02) Memorial to the officers and men of the 2nd Volunteer Battalion East Kent Regiment (The Buffs) is made of limestone with two cast iron plaques, one with an inscription and the other with the names of the seven soldiers who had died. Above the two plaques Hitch carved the official badge of the Buffs and the words "Weald of Kent." | St Dunstan’s Church memorial, Cranbrook, by Hitch |
| St Mary’s Church | 1921 unveiled | Stoke by Nayland, Suffolk | William Douglas Caröe | Hitch worked on a Calvary on a stepped base which remembers 41 men who were killed in the First World War and 12 killed in the Second World War. | |
| Barrow-upon-Soar War Memorial Cross | 1921 | Barrow-upon-Soar | | In a niche near the base of the shaft bearing the Cross, Hitch carved a figure of St George. The inscription on the memorial reads- "Greater love hath no man than this that a man lay down his life for his friends (names) — inscription The memorial remembers 71 men killed in the First World War and 19 killed in the Second World War. | |
| St Mary the Virgin | | Gillingham. Dorset | | Hitch carved a reredos in Portland Stone depicting the Nativity. The reredos was erected in memory of Walter Freaney Matthew killed in action 28 September 1917 aged 29 and of Phillip Matthews killed in action 16 September 1916 aged 20. | |
| St Peter's | 1920 | Berkhamsted. Hertfordshire | | Hitch carved some red alabaster panels mounted in borders of light green marble and capped by a canopy of green marble. Above each of the side panels are the Union Jack and White ensign and the arms of Berkhampstead are also featured. | |
| St George's Centre | | Chatham. Kent | | Hitch worked on a triptych depicting a Christ figure surrounded by shields, saints and emblems representing the Countries of the United Kingdom and Britain's Allies during the First World War. The wings of the triptych have carvings of shields of the British Commonwealth and Empire. | |

=== Other types of works ===
| Name | Year | Location | Architect | Comments | Image |
|---|---|---|---|---|---|
| Building at 55 to 73 Duke Street | 1890s | | William Douglas Caröe | Hitch carried out some general carving to the building’s exterior near Grosvenor Square. | |
| Sherwood Lodge | Unknown | | | Hitch also did some relief carvings for the lodge, which is now the Headquarters of Nottingham Police. The present whereabouts of the work is not known. | |

=== Gallery of additional images ===
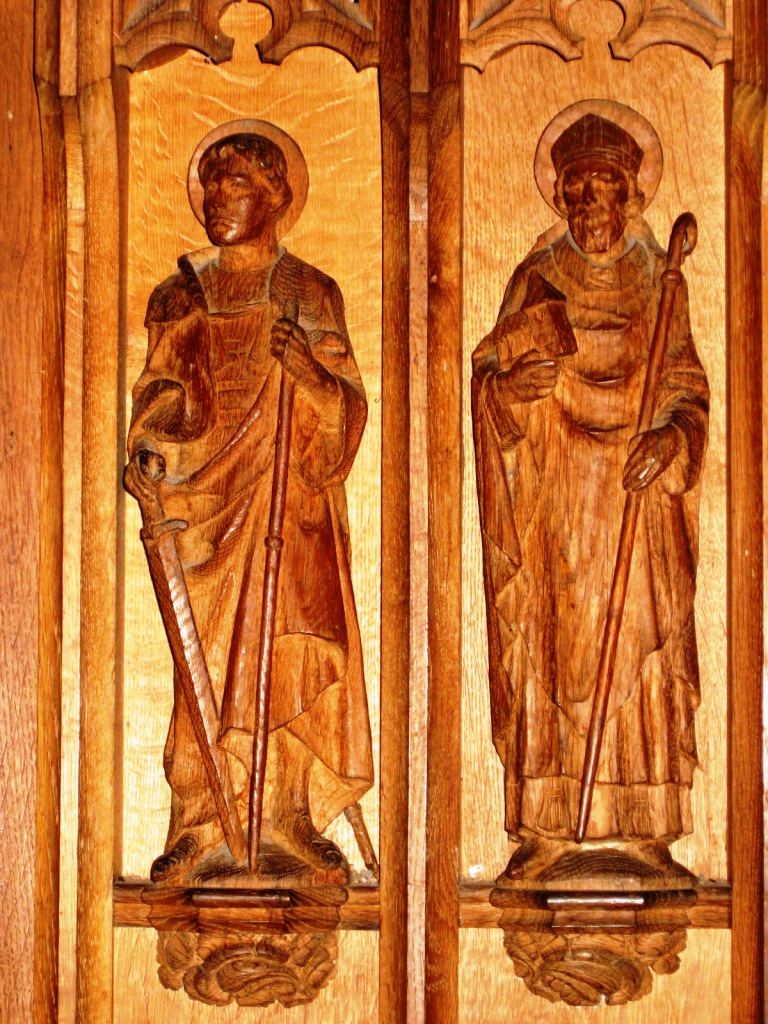
St Alban and St Cedd. All Saints' Braxted.

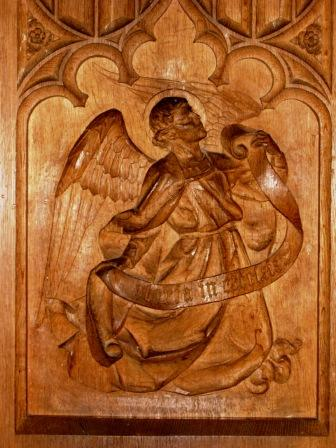
Angel with scroll All Saints' Braxted

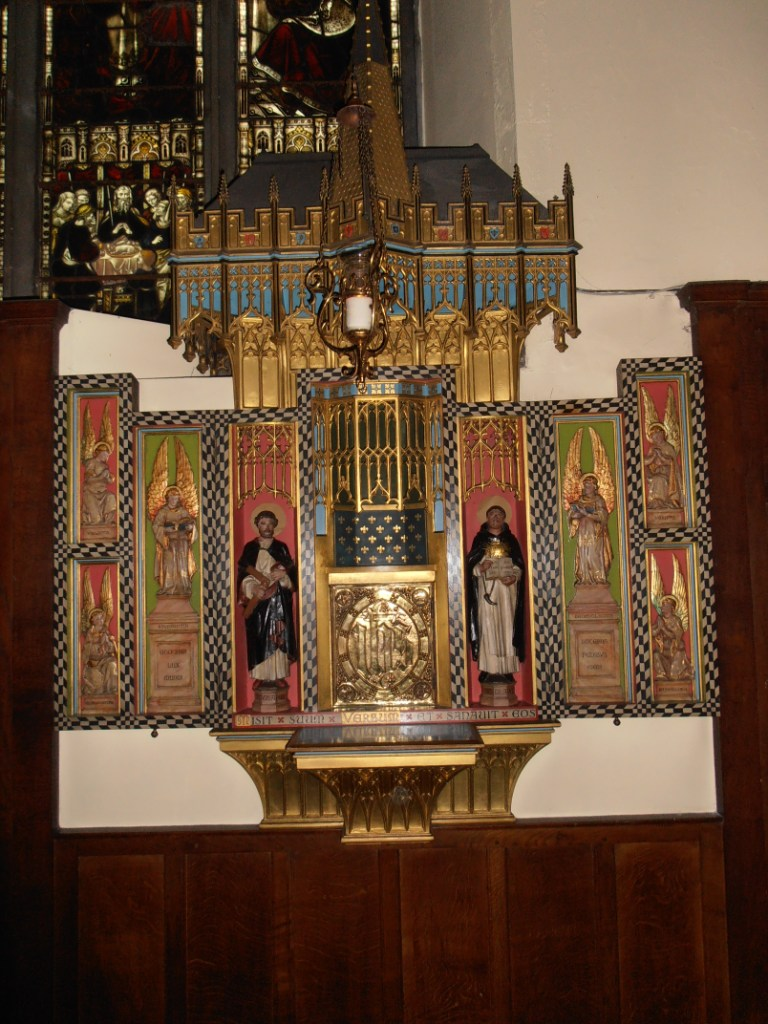
Aumbry in St Mary Magdalene. Munster Square

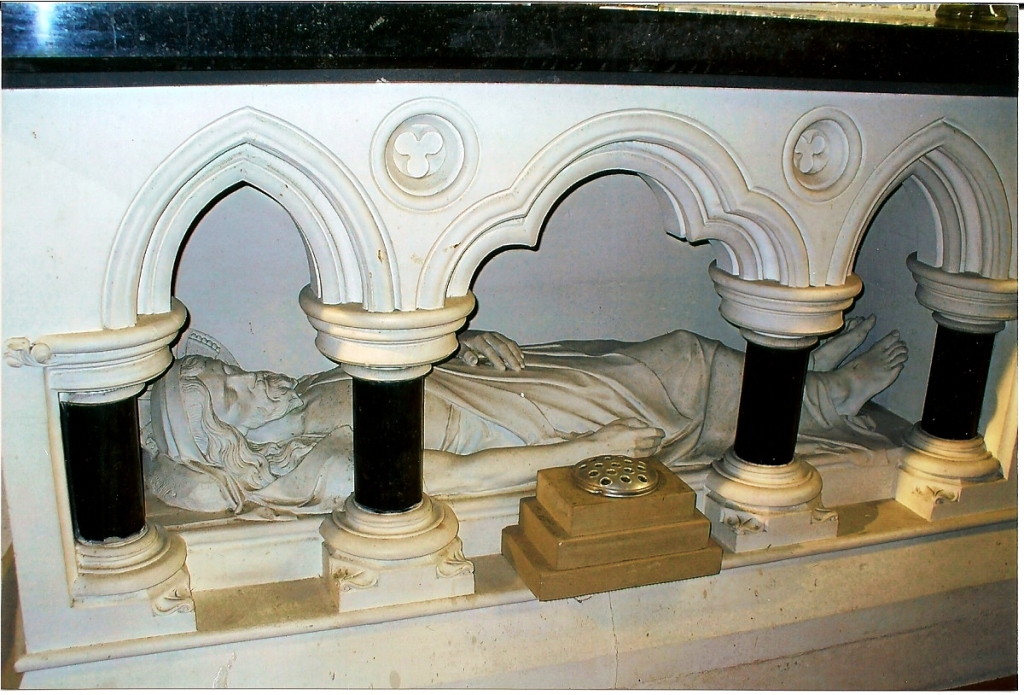
The lower part of the altar piece at St Mary of the Angels Church. Worthing. Christ lies recumbent within an arched recess.

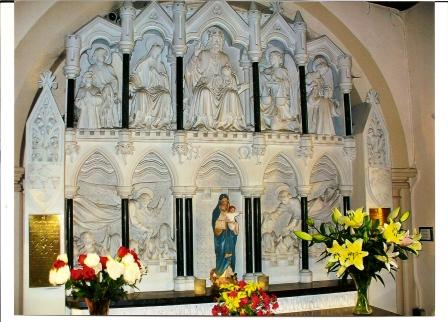
The upper part of the altar piece at St Mary of the Angels Church. Worthing.

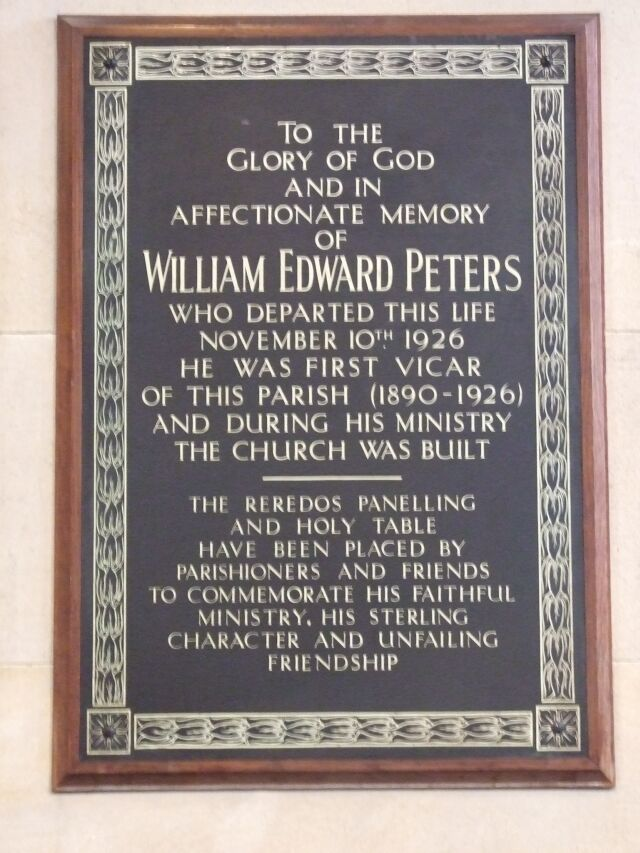
Tablet in St Peter's Guildford

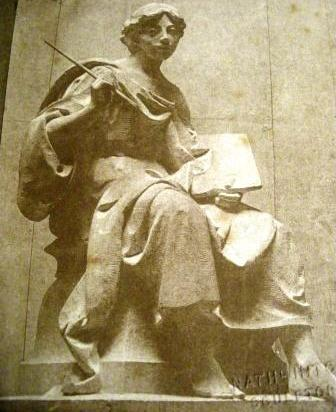
Passmore Edwards Public Library.

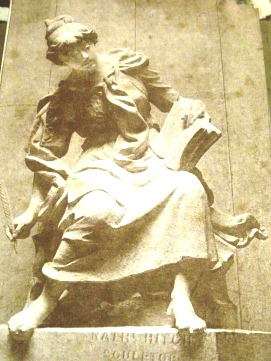
Passmore Edwards Public Library.

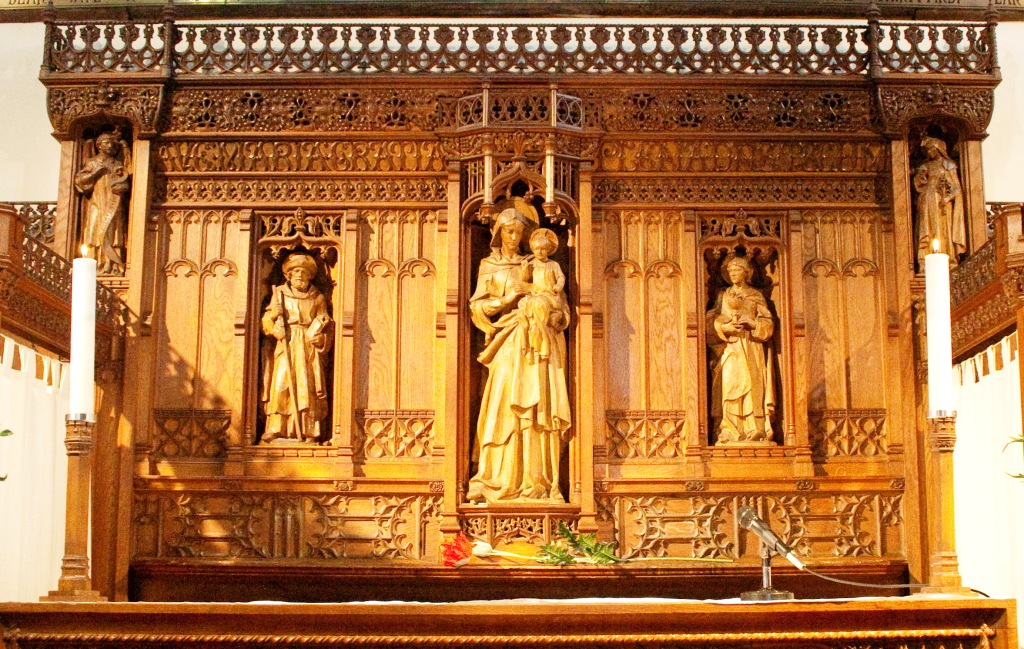
The reredos in Egremont

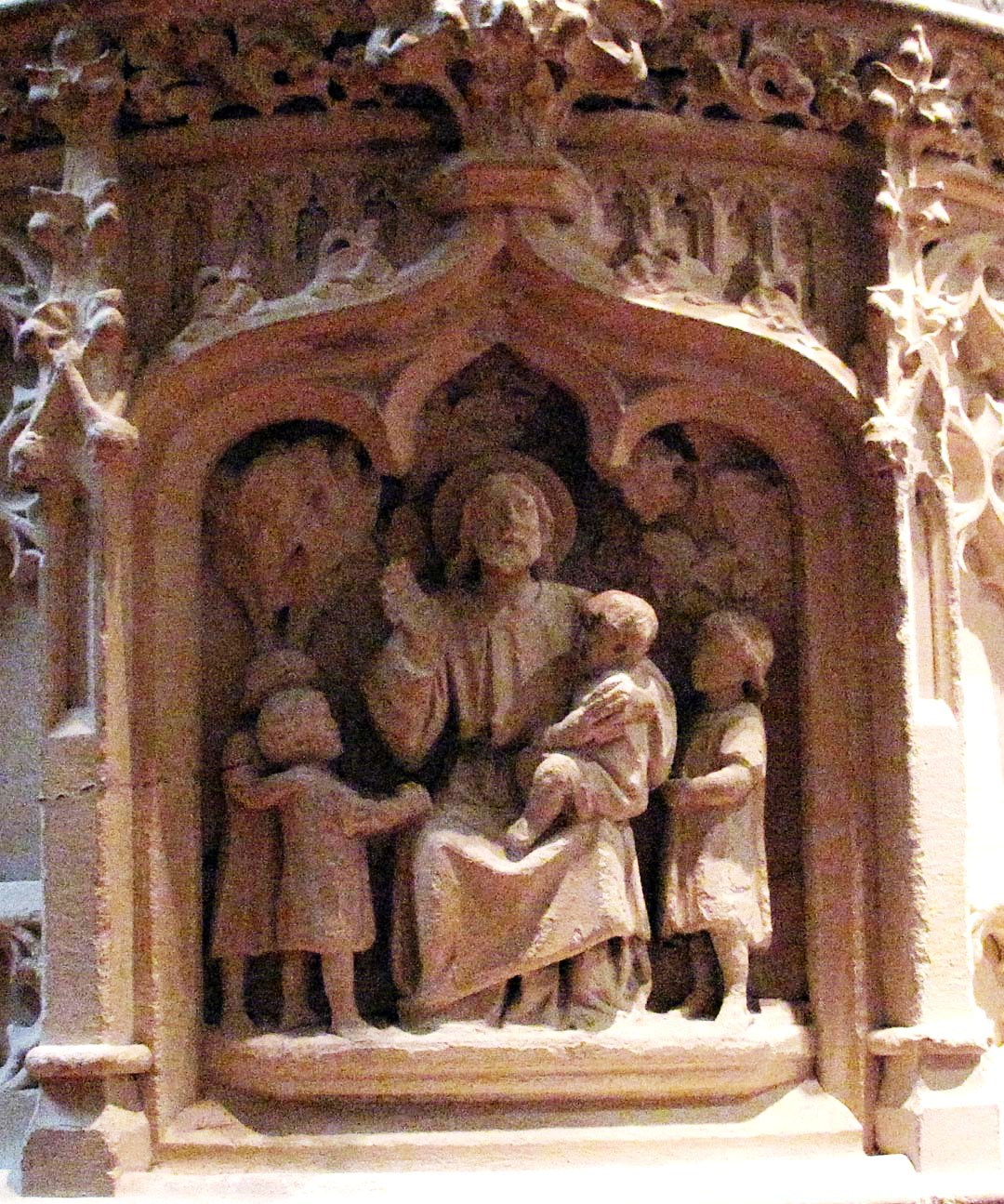
Panel on St Nicholas Chiswick font. Courtesy Peter Hammond.

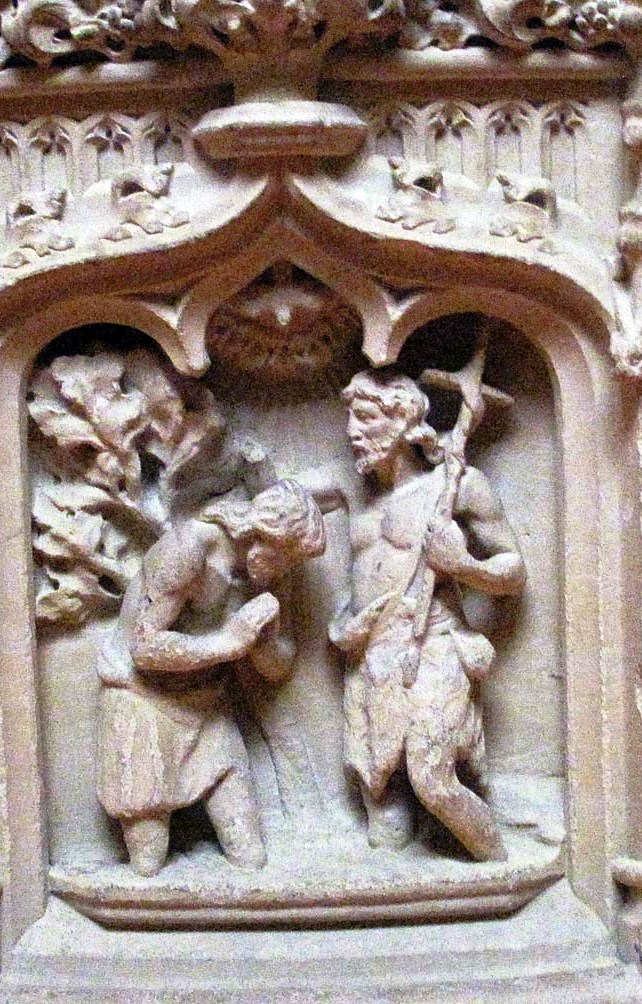
Panel on St Nicholas Chiswick font. Courtesy Peter Hammond.

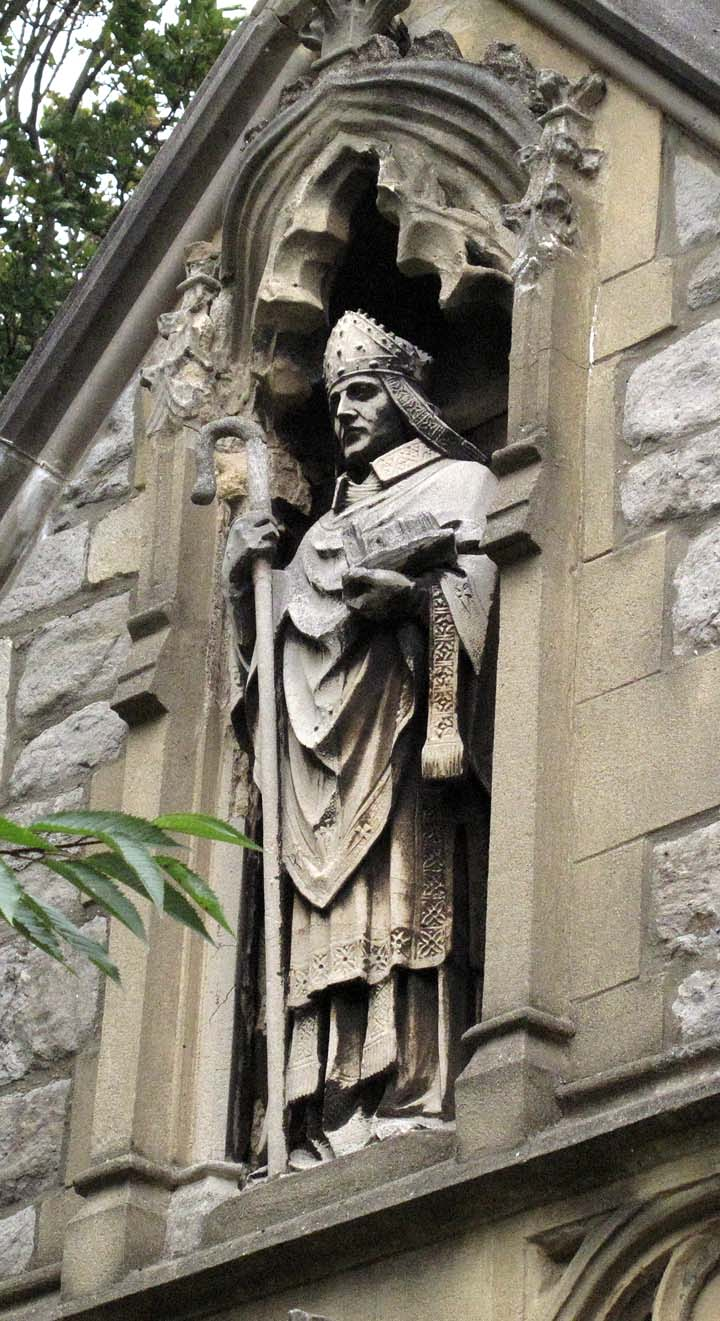
Statue of St Nicholas. Courtesy Peter Hammond.

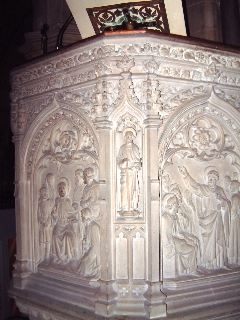
The pulpit at St Paul’s, Daybrook. Courtesy Olive R. Taylor.

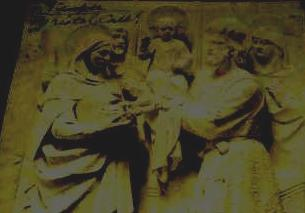
Relief on wall behind reredos - Bristol Cathedral. The photograph is from Hitch’s Leeds album.

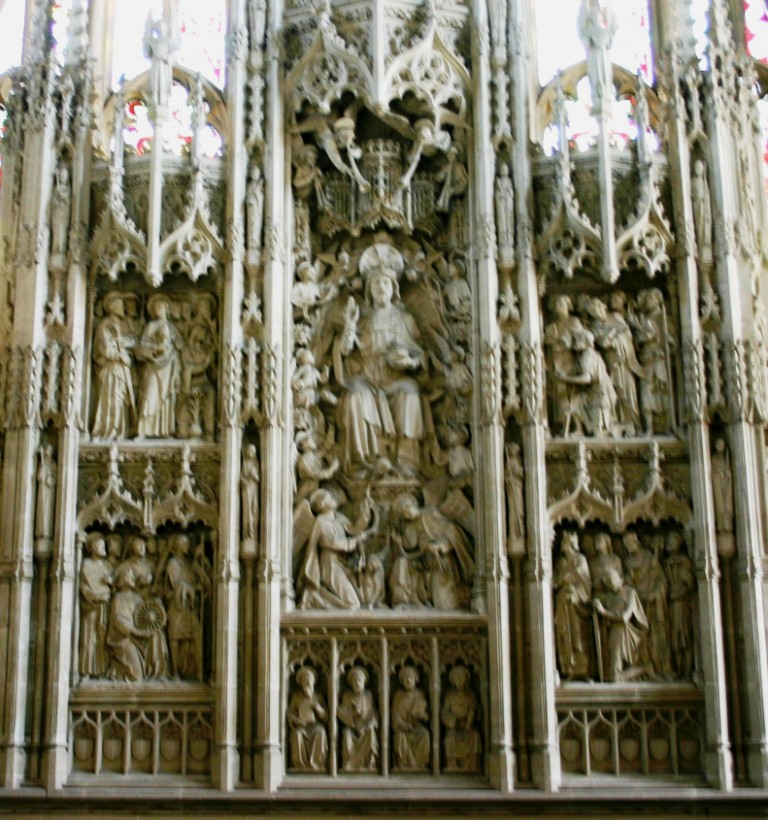
The All Saints' Maidstone Reredos.

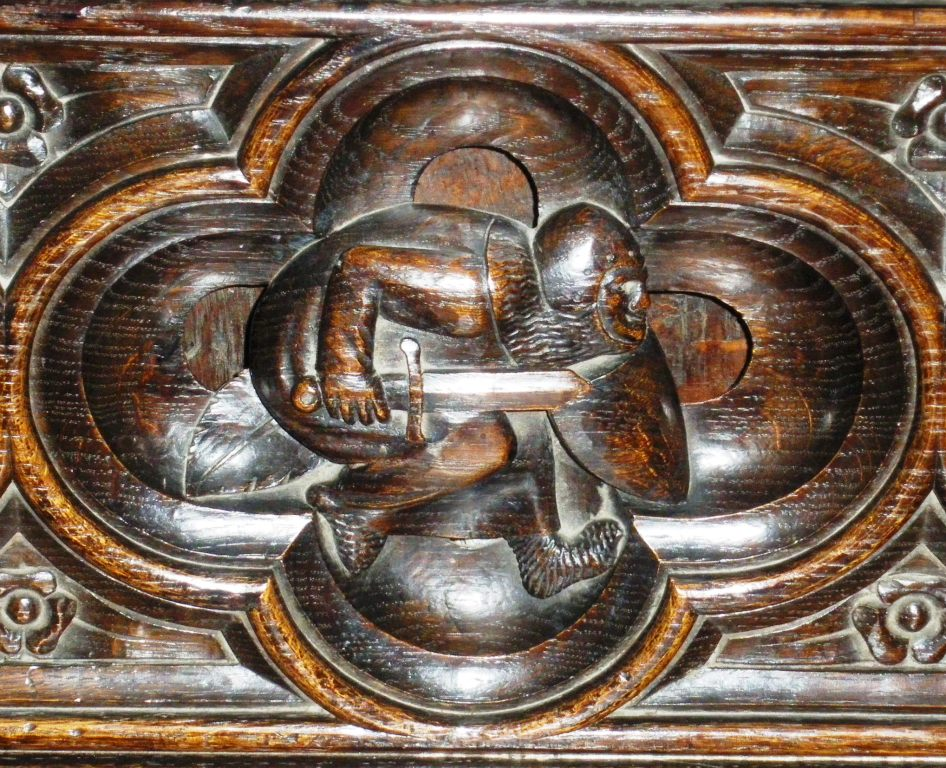
Choir Stall carving- Lincoln Cathedral

== Bibliography ==
- Leeds Museums & Galleries
  - Photograph album of the sculpture of Nathaniel Hitch and others c. 1890–1930. Reference 1999.1.
  - Photograph albums of the sculpture of Nathaniel Hitch and Frederick Brook Hitch c. 1870–1957. Reference 2004.26
  - Three lists of works executed by Nathaniel Hitch between 1885 and 1930 n.d. [1885–1930]. Reference 2009.21.
  - Printed list of works by Nathaniel Hitch n.d. [c. 1899]. Reference 2009.21/1.
  - Photocopy of abridged supplementary list of work by Nathaniel Hitch n.d. [c1930]. Reference 2009.21/2.
  - Photocopy of abridged supplementary list of work by Nathaniel Hitch n.d. [c. 1925]. Reference 2009.21/3.
