= List of churches in the London Borough of Barnet =

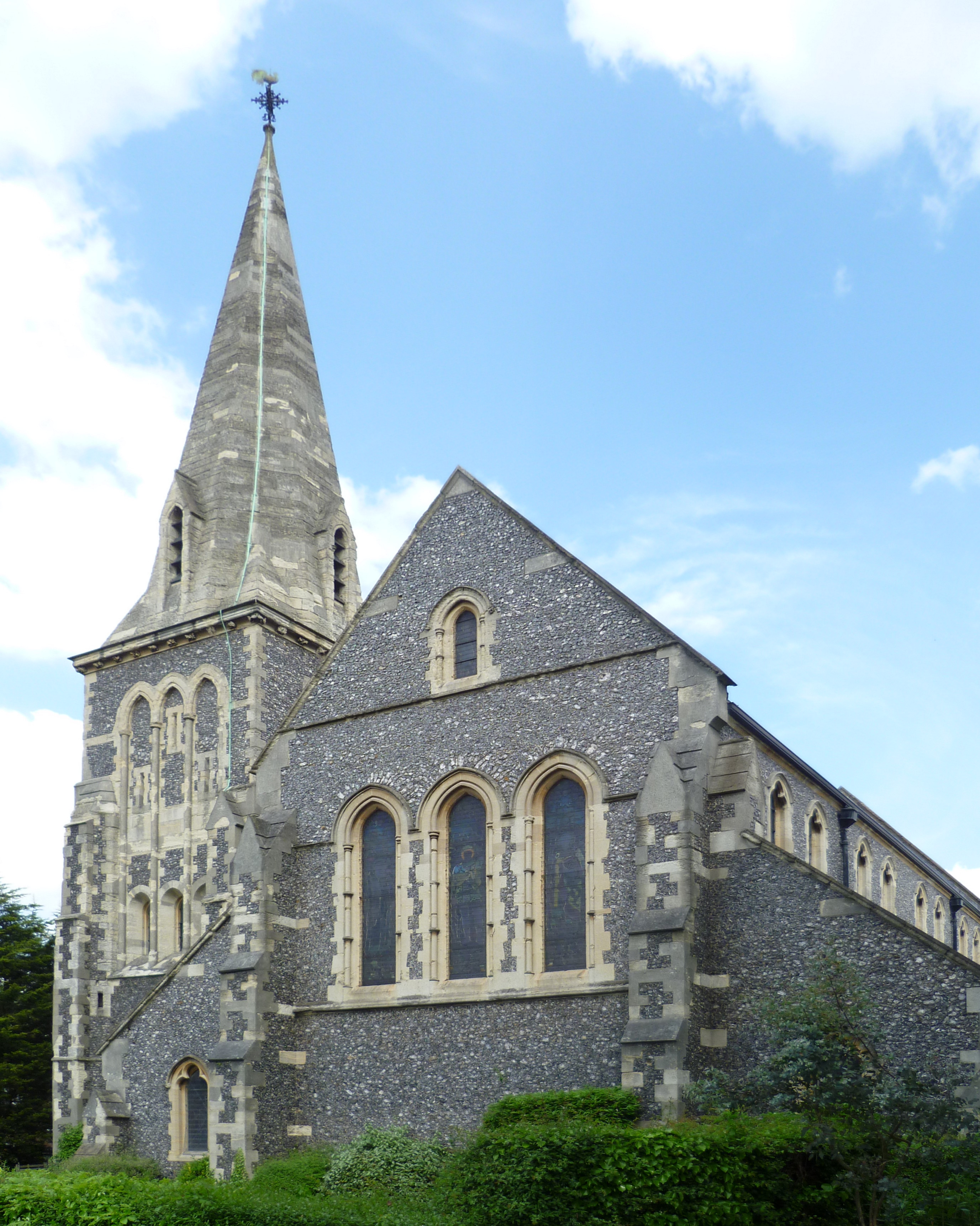
All Saints' Church, Oakleigh Park

This is a list of cathedrals, churches and chapels in the London Borough of Barnet within the Greater London. The list focuses on the more permanent churches and buildings which identify themselves as places of Christian worship. The denominations appended are those by which they self-identify.

== History ==
London's churches and chapels are extraordinarily numerous and diverse. Anglican and nonconformist churches and chapels are most numerous, but there are also many Catholic churches as well as places of worship for non-Christian religions.

Most of the Anglican churches lie within the Anglican dioceses of London to the north and Southwark to the south. A few Anglican churches in the Barnet area fall into the Diocese of St Albans, reflecting the historical association of Barnet with Hertfordshire. As London expanded during the early 19th century, many new churches and chapels were built independently by the growing nonconformist urban population.

Churches in this list belong to various denominations, as indicated.

== List of churches ==
Church name	Location	Dedication	Web	Founded	Denomination	Notes
St Mary, Hendon	Hendon	Mary		C11th	Anglican	Hendon Parish
St Mary the Virgin, East Barnet	East Barnet	Mary		C11th	Anglican	
St Mary-at-Finchley	Finchley	Mary		C12th	Anglican	
St Mary the Virgin, Monken Hadley	Monken Hadley	Mary		Medieval	Anglican	
St Andrew, Totteridge	Totteridge	Andrew		C13th	Anglican	Rebuilt 1790s
St John the Baptist, Chipping Barnet	Chipping Barnet	John the Baptist		C13th	Anglican	Chipping Barnet Team. Rebuilt 1400
St Margaret of Antioch, Edgware	Edgware	Margaret the Virgin		C13th	Anglican	Edgware Parish
St John the Apostle, Whetstone	Whetstone	John the Evangelist		1832	Anglican	
St Paul, Mill Hill	Mill Hill	Paul		1833	Anglican	
St Peter, Arkley	Arkley	Peter		1840	Anglican	Chipping Barnet Team Ministry
Holy Trinity, East Finchley	East Finchley	Trinity		1846	Anglican	
Christ Church, Barnet	Chipping Barnet	Jesus		1845–1852	Anglican	
All Saints, Child's Hill	Child's Hill	All Saints		1857	Anglican	
Christ Church, North Finchley	North Finchley	Jesus		1864	Anglican	Building 1869–1891
Holy Trinity, Lyonsdown	New Barnet	Trinity		1866	Anglican	
St John the Evangelist, West Hendon	Hendon	John the Evangelist		1866	Anglican	Building 1896. United with St Matthias Colindale
St Peter-le-Poer, Friern Barnet	Friern Barnet	Peter		1866	Anglican	First building 1884, current building 1909
St Paul, New Southgate	New Southgate	Paul		1870	Anglican	Building 1873. Bishop of Fulham
Christ Church, Hendon	Hendon	Jesus		1881	Anglican	Hendon Parish
All Saints, Oakleigh Park	Oakleigh Park	All Saints		1883	Anglican	
St Barnabas, Woodside Park	Woodside Park	Barnabas		1885	Anglican	
St Paul, Finchley	Finchley	Paul		1885–1886	Anglican	
St John, Friern Barnet	Friern Barnet	John the Evangelist		1890	Anglican	
All Saints, East Finchley	East Finchley	All Saints		1891	Anglican	Bishop of Fulham
St Stephen, Bell's Hill	Chipping Barnet	Stephen		1897	Anglican	Chipping Barnet Team Ministry
St Mark, Barnet Vale	Barnet Vale	Mark		1902	Anglican	Chipping Barnet Team Ministry
St Alphage, Burnt Oak	Burnt Oak	Ælfheah of C'bury		1904	Anglican	Current building 1927
St Matthias, Colindale	Colindale	Matthias		1905	Anglican	Building 1934, rebuilt 1970s
St Jude-on-the-Hill	Hampstead Garden	Jude		1908	Anglican	Building 1911
St Michael & All Angels, Mill Hill	Mill Hill	Michael & Angels		1909	Anglican	Building 1922
Golders Green Parish Church	Golders Green	Alban the Martyr		1910	Anglican	Rebuilt 1933
John Keble Church, Mill Hill	Mill Hill	John Keble		1932	Anglican	Building 1936. Unique dedication
St Andrew, Edgware	Edgware	Andrew		1937	Anglican	Edgware Parish
St Peter's Community Church, Stonegrove	Edgware	Peter		1962	Anglican	Edgware Parish
St Augustine, Grahame Park	Grahame Park	Augustine of C'bury		1975	Anglican	Bishop of Fulham
Oakleigh Community Church	Whetstone				Anglican	Satellite church of St Barnabas, Woodside Park
Faith House	Colindale				Anglican	A church plant of St Barnabas, Woodside Park
St James, New Barnet	New Barnet	James				
Mary Immaculate & St Gregory the Great	Barnet	Mary & Gregory I		1849	Roman Catholic	
Mary Immaculate and St Peter, New Barnet	New Barnet	Mary & Peter		1870	Roman Catholic	First building 1904, current building 1938
Sacred Heart & Mary Immaculate, Mill Hill	Mill Hill	Sacred Heart, Mary		1889	Roman Catholic	Building 1905, rebuilt 1922–1923. Served by Cong of the Mission
St Mary, East Finchley	East Finchley	Mary		1898	Roman Catholic	Rebuilt 1952
St Alban, North Finchley	North Finchley	Alban		1903	Roman Catholic	Building 1909
St Edward the Confessor, Golders Green	Temple Fortune	Edw the Confessor		1915	Roman Catholic	
St Philip the Apostle, Finchley	Finchley Church End	Philip		1919	Roman Catholic	Building 1925
St Anthony of Padua, Edgware	Edgware	Anthony of Padua		1931	Roman Catholic	
St Patrick, West Hendon	West Hendon	Patrick		1964	Roman Catholic	
Annunciation, Burnt Oak	Burnt Oak	Annunciation			Roman Catholic	
St Mary Magdalen, Whetstone	Whetstone	Mary Magdalene			Roman Catholic	
Our Lady of Dolours, Hendon	Hendon	Mary			Roman Catholic	
St Agnes, Cricklewood	Cricklewood	Agnes of Rome			Roman Catholic	
St Margaret Clitherow, Grahame Park	Grahame Park	Margaret Clitherow			Roman Catholic	
St Cyril of Turau & the Belarusian Patron Sts	Woodside Park	Kirill of Turov etc.		2015–2016	Belarusian Catholic	First wooden church built in London since 1666
Holy Cross & Archangel Michael, Golders Gn	Golders Green	Cross & Michael		pre-1970	Greek Orthodox	Moved into current building (St Michael's) 1970
St Catherine's Greek Orthodox Church	Whetstone	Catherine of Alex			Greek Orthodox	Building previously St James the Great, Friern Barnet
St Mary & Archangel Michael Coptic Church	Temple Fortune	Mary & Michael		1996	Coptic Orthodox	Building was St Barnabas' CoE
Hendon Baptist Church	Hendon			1873	Baptist Union	Building 1886
Barnet Underhill Baptist Church	Barnet			1936	Baptist	
High Barnet Baptist Church	High Barnet				Baptist	
East Barnet Baptist Church	East Barnet				Baptist	
Finchley Baptist Church	Finchley Church End				Baptist	
East Finchley Methodist Church	East Finchley			1822	Methodist	Building 1829, current building 1897
Barnet Brookside Methodist Church	East Barnet			1857	Methodist	Two sites
Manor Drive Methodist Church	Whetstone			1938	Methodist	
Edgware Methodist Church	Edgware				Methodist	
Finchley Methodist Church	Finchley				Methodist	
Hendon Methodist Church	Hendon				Methodist	
Trinity Church North Finchley	North Finchley	Trinity		1864	Baptist / URC	Baptist and URC churches united 1980
Mill Hill East Church	Mill Hill East				Baptist / URC	
Hampstead Garden Suburb Free Church	Hampstead Garden			1909	Baptist? / URC	Building 1911
Trinity Church Golders Green	Golders Green	Trinity			Methodist / URC	Methodist and URC churches united 1979
Trinity Church Mill Hill	Mill Hill	Trinity		1886	Methodist / URC	Methodist and URC churches united 2008
Christ Church at Whetstone	Whetstone	Jesus		1788	URC	
St John's United Ref Church, New Barnet	New Barnet	John		1870	URC	1963 union of Presbyterian and Congregational churches
St Margaret's United Reformed Church	Finchley			1893	URC	Finchley Presbyterian & Congregational churches merged 1969
Barnet United Reformed Church	Barnet				URC	
Chesterfield Road United Reformed Church	Barnet				URC	
The Hyde United Reformed Church	Colindale				URC	
Union Church Totteridge	Totteridge				URC	
Wood Street United Reformed Church	Chipping Barnet			1669	URC	Current building 1893
East Finchley Baptist Church	East Finchley			1877	FIEC	New building 1889, 1902, 1931
Trinity Church	Colindale			2003	Catalyst	
New Barnet Quaker Meeting	New Barnet			1873	Quakers	
New Barnet Quaker Meeting	New Barnet			1873	Quakers	
Golders Green Quaker Meeting	Hampstead Garden			1913	Quakers	
Edgware Quaker Meeting	Edgware			c. 1930s	Quakers	
Finchley Quaker Meeting	Finchley			1945	Quakers	Building 1967
Our Lady of Lourdes	Friern Barnet				Roman Catholic	
St Matthias	Edgware				Roman Catholic	
St Michael and All Angels	Edgware				Anglican	
St Paul	Edgware				Anglican	

=== Defunct churches ===
Church name	Neighbourhood	Dedication	Founded	Ended	Denomination	Notes
St James the Great, Friern Barnet	Friern Barnet	James	C12th		Anglican	Closed, now St Katherine's Greek Orthodox
St Luke, Finchley	Finchley	Luke	1905	1985	Anglican	
St Michael, Golders Green	Golders Green	Michael	1910	1979	Anglican	Building 1914, closed 1979 & given to Greek Orthodox
St Barnabas, Temple Fortune	Temple Fortune	Barnabas	1890s		Anglican	Building 1915. Closed, now Coptic Orthodox
St Peter, Cricklewood	Cricklewood	Peter	1882	1971	Anglican	Building 1891
New Barnet Baptist Church	New Barnet		1872		Baptist	Demolished 1982
New Barnet Congregational Church	New Barnet			1967		
New Barnet Methodist Chapel	New Barnet				Methodist	Closed

== Related lists ==
- List of churches in London
- List of Christopher Wren churches in London
- List of places of worship in London, 1804
- Union of Benefices Act 1860
- Commission for Building Fifty New Churches

== External links/sources ==
- Anglican Diocese of London
- Baptist Union Churches
- Church of England Parish Finder
- Church of England churches in central London
- The Church of Jesus Christ of Latter-day Saints
- The History Files Churches of the British Isles
- Congregational Churches in London
- Friends of the City Churches
- Gospel Hall Finder
- Greek Orthodox Archdiocese of Thyateira and Great Britain
- Love's Guide to the Church Bells of the City of London
- Methodist Church of Great Britain Church Search
- Roman Catholic Diocese of Brentwood Parishes A-Z
- Roman Catholic Diocese of Westminster – Virtual Diocese
- Roman Catholic Archdiocese of Southwark – Parish Directory
- Seventh-day Adventist Churches in London
- United Reformed Church Find A Church
- Redeemed Christian Church of God
