= Oakleigh Park Rail Cutting =

Coordinates: 51.633°N 0.162°W

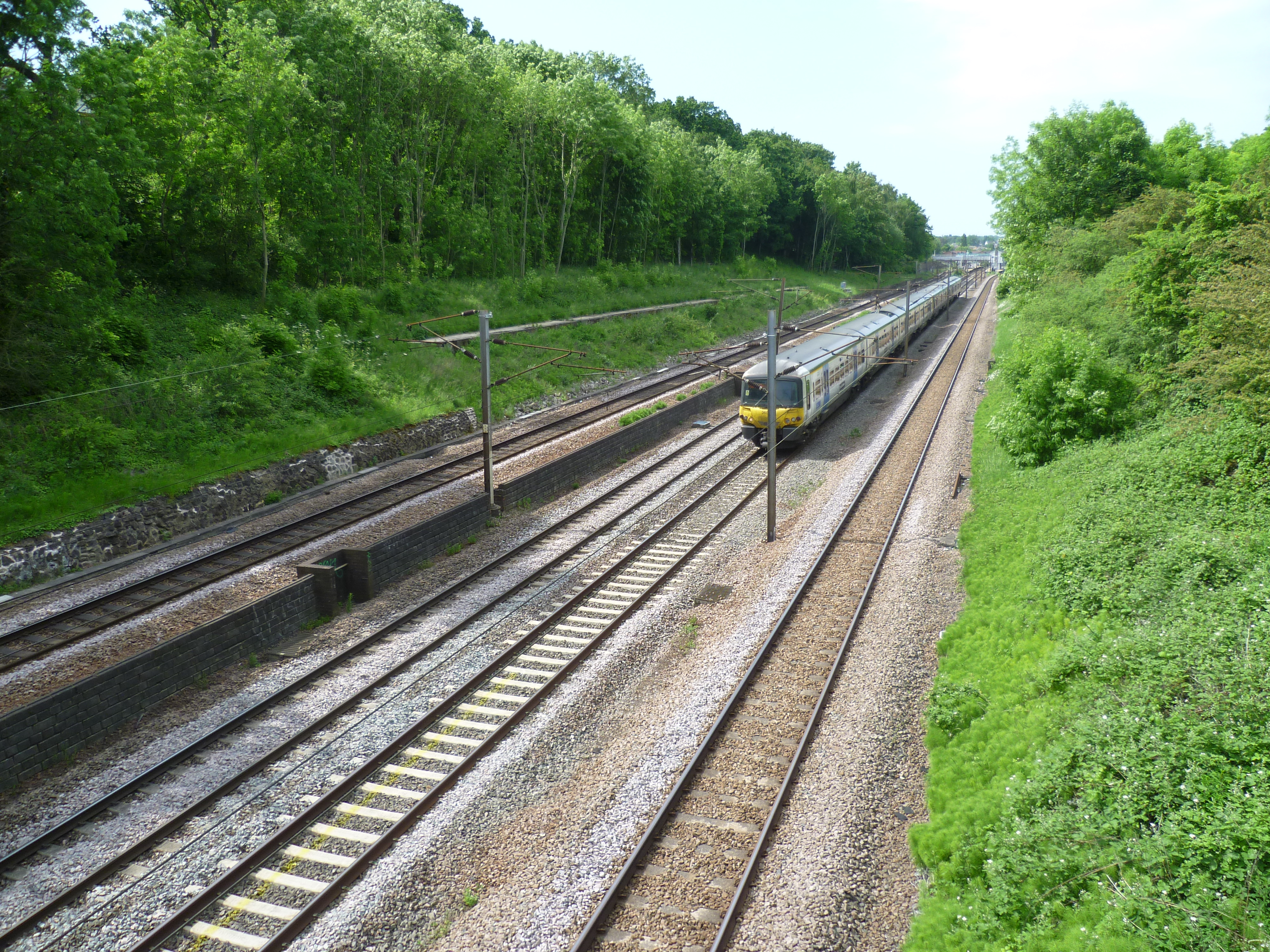
Oakleigh Park Rail Cutting looking north.

Oakleigh Park Rail Cutting is an 8-hectare (20-acre) Site of Local Importance for Nature Conservation in Oakleigh Park in the London Borough of Barnet. It is on the East Coast Main Line between Oakleigh Park railway station and Barnet Tunnel to its south.

The site is a wide railway cutting with a diversity of habitat which provides a good example of railway ecology. The eastern bank has extensive brambles with clumps of blackthorn and hawthorn, and herbs such as rosebay willowherb and Michaelmas daisy. The western bank is more natural with mature woodland of oak, ash, sycamore, and silver birch near the tunnel. The site is a useful habitat for birds such as goldfinch, wrens and dunnocks.

The cutting can be viewed from a footbridge between Alverstone Avenue and Oakleigh Park South.

== See also ==
- Nature reserves in Barnet
