= John Miles (businessman) =

English businessman (1816–1886)

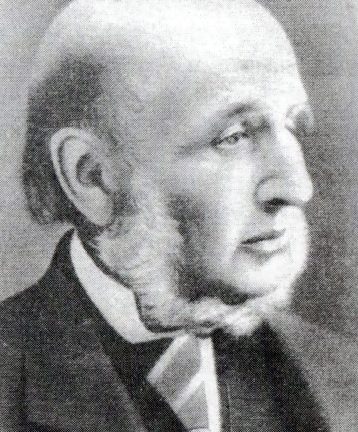
John Miles

John Miles (16 March 1816 – 5 May 1886) was an English businessman who was master of the Stationers Company and a director of the New River Company. He was a major landowner in Friern Barnet and Whetstone in north London in the second half of the nineteenth century and was instrumental in the development of those areas.

== Early life and family ==
John Miles was born at 16 Bridge Street in Blackfriars, London, on 16 March 1816. He married Sophia and together they had children Sophia, Charles, and Henry when they were living at Chessington, Surrey. They later moved to Hampstead and to Friern Barnet where they had children Eliza and Amy.

== Career ==
Miles began his career with Simkin and Marshall, booksellers, in 1829, eventually becoming a partner in the firm. He became master of the Stationers Company and a director of the New River Company, the later bringing him significant wealth.

In 1851, Miles bought for £6,000 the Manor House Farm of 29 acres to the west of Friern Barnet Lane. He had the farm house rebuilt, possibly by Edward and William Habershon, and renamed it Manor House. The building is now the clubhouse for the North Middlesex Golf Club. Miles was a significant landowner in the area. In addition to the 29 acres of Manor House Farm, he owned land extending north into Whetstone and Oakleigh Park North.

== Philanthropy ==
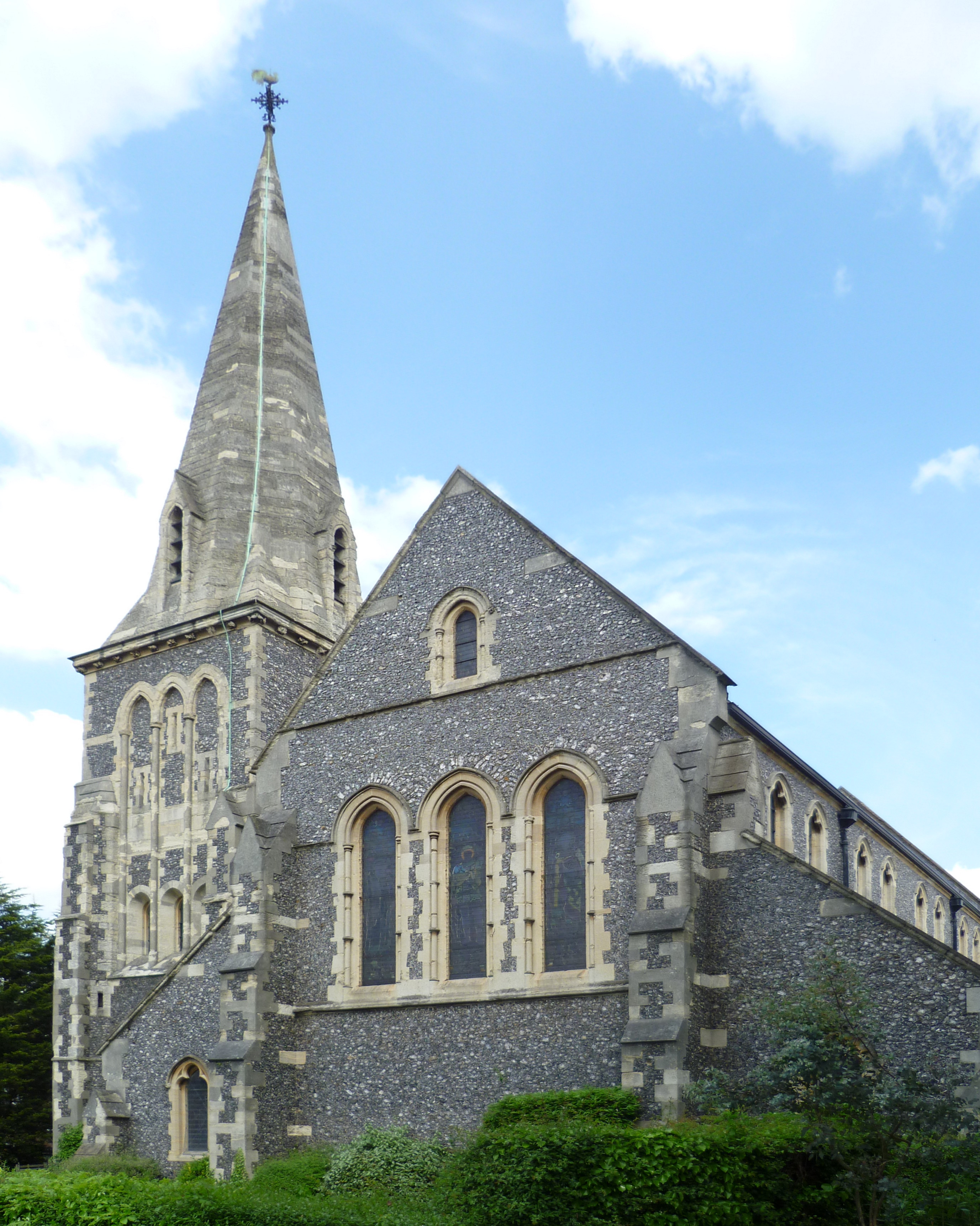
All Saints' Church, Oakleigh Park. Paid for by John Miles.

Miles's philanthropic activities included a number of charities associated with the book trade. He also employed the Habershons to extend St James the Great church and to design St James's School in Friern Barnet Lane. He gave the land and financed the construction of All Saints' Church (1881–82), parish hall, and a vicarage in Myddleton Park, to serve the people of the expanding Oakleigh Park estate, and served as churchwarden of both churches. His son Henry was vicar of All Saints'.

== Death and legacy ==
Miles died on 5 May 1886. His wife Sophia died in 1902 after which the Miles estate lands began to be sold off for development. Land to the west of Blackett's Brook, adjacent to Manor House Farm, was acquired by the Wilderness Golf Club in 1905 with help from Ernest Lazarus, and with the former Manor House Farm estate eventually became the North Middlesex Golf Club.
