= Our Lady of Willesden Church =

Coordinates: 51.536°N 0.2492°W

- National Shrine of Our Lady of Willesden
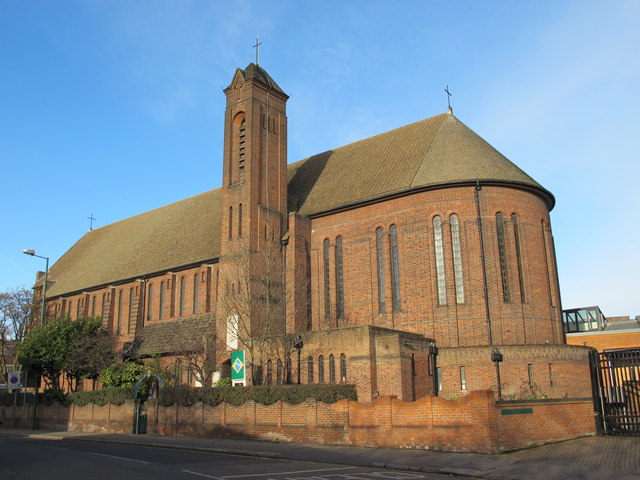
- Our Lady of Willesden Church
- Location: Harlesden
- Country: England
- Denomination: Catholic
- Website: Official website

History
- Status: Parish church
- Dedication: Mary, Mother of Jesus

Architecture
- Functional status: Active
- Heritage designation: Grade II listed
- Designated: 4 November 2016
- Architect: Wilfrid Clarence Mangan
- Style: Romanesque Revival
- Groundbreaking: 1929
- Completed: 1931

Administration
- Province: Westminster
- Archdiocese: Westminster
- Deanery: Brent
- Parish: Willesden

Our Lady of Willesden Church is a Catholic parish church in Harlesden, Willesden, Borough of Brent, London. It was built from 1929 to 1931, and houses a shrine to Our Lady of Willesden, its statue dating to 1892. The church was built in the Romanesque Revival style and designed by Wilfrid Clarence Mangan. It is located on Acton Lane, on the junction with the Harlesden High Street across from Willesden County Court and All Souls Church. It is a Grade II listed building.

== History ==
=== Origin ===
As there were other missions outside Willesden serving its Catholic population, it was not until 1885 that one was started in the town. It was started in Harlesden for the growing Irish population in the area. That year, Mass was celebrated in a house on Tubbs Road. the following year, a temporary chapel, made of iron, was built on Manor Park Road. In the 1880s, a convent was also founded. In 1892, a new statue was installed in the chapel by Cardinal Vaughan. This shrine started a series of annual processions. In 1903, one of these processions was attacks by Protestants. In 1907, a new church, was built on Crown Hill. It was constructed with made with terracotta in the Romanesque Revival style. In 1918, the mission became a parish.

=== Construction ===
In 1926, land was bought for the construction of a new, larger church. In 1929, plans were made for it. An architect, Wilfrid Clarence Mangan, was commissioned to design it. He also designed St Mary Magdalen Church, Whetstone, Our Lady of Sorrows Church, Bognor Regis and St Joseph's Church, Newbury. In 1931, the church was opened. Like the church it replaced, it was built in the Romanesque Revival style. The shrine chapel of Our Lady of Willesden is in the northeast of the church.

In 1944, a new pulpit and main altar were installed. On 15 August 1958, the feast of the Assumption, Saint Josemaría Escrivá consecrated Opus Dei to the Virgin Mary there in the church. The shrine chapel was refurbished in 1995.

== Parish ==
Within the parish are St Claudine's Catholic School for Girls and Newman Catholic College. The church has four Sunday Masses at 6:00 pm on Saturday and at 9:00 am, 11:00 am and at 5:30 pm on Sunday.

== Interior ==
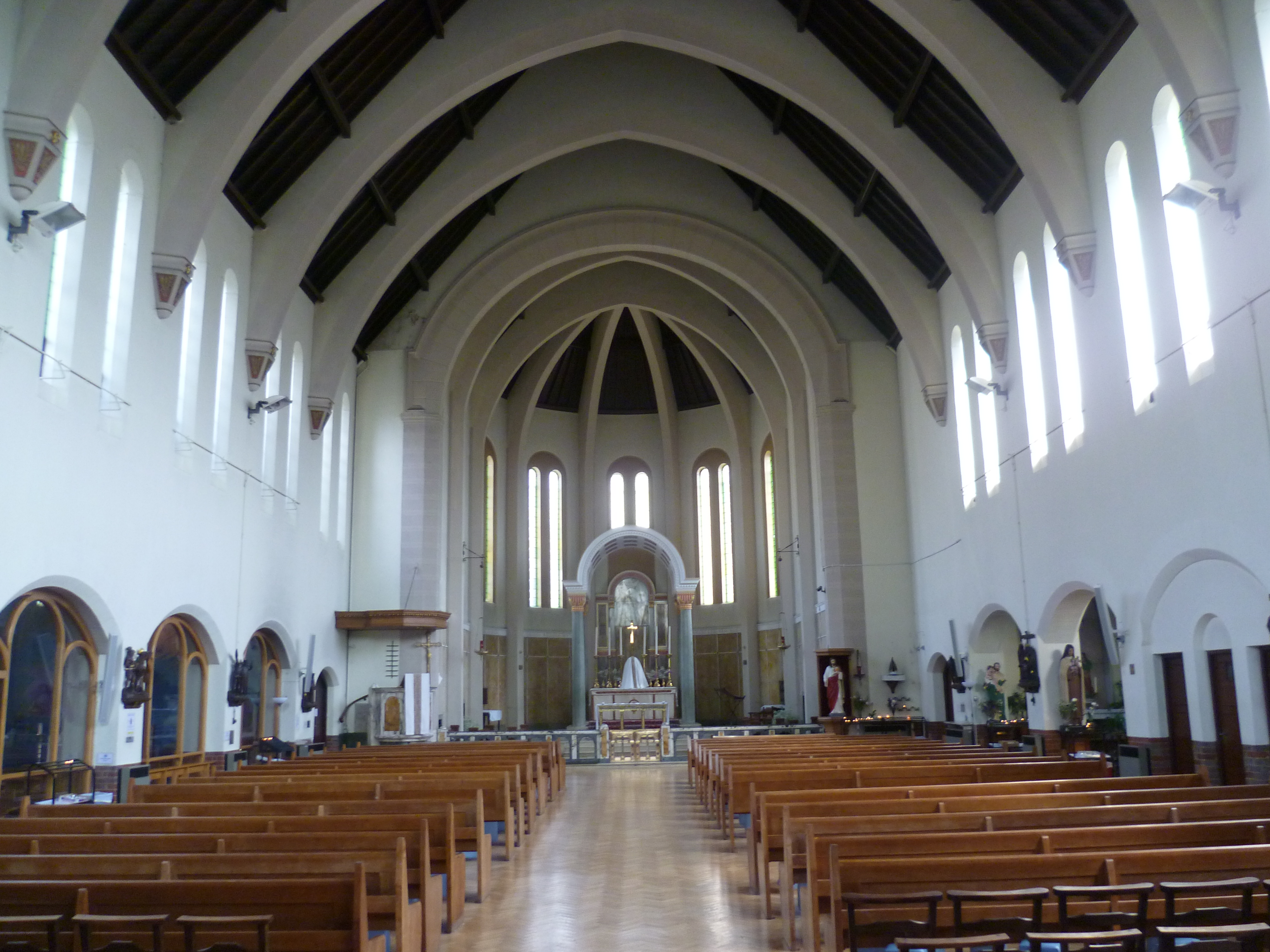
Interior

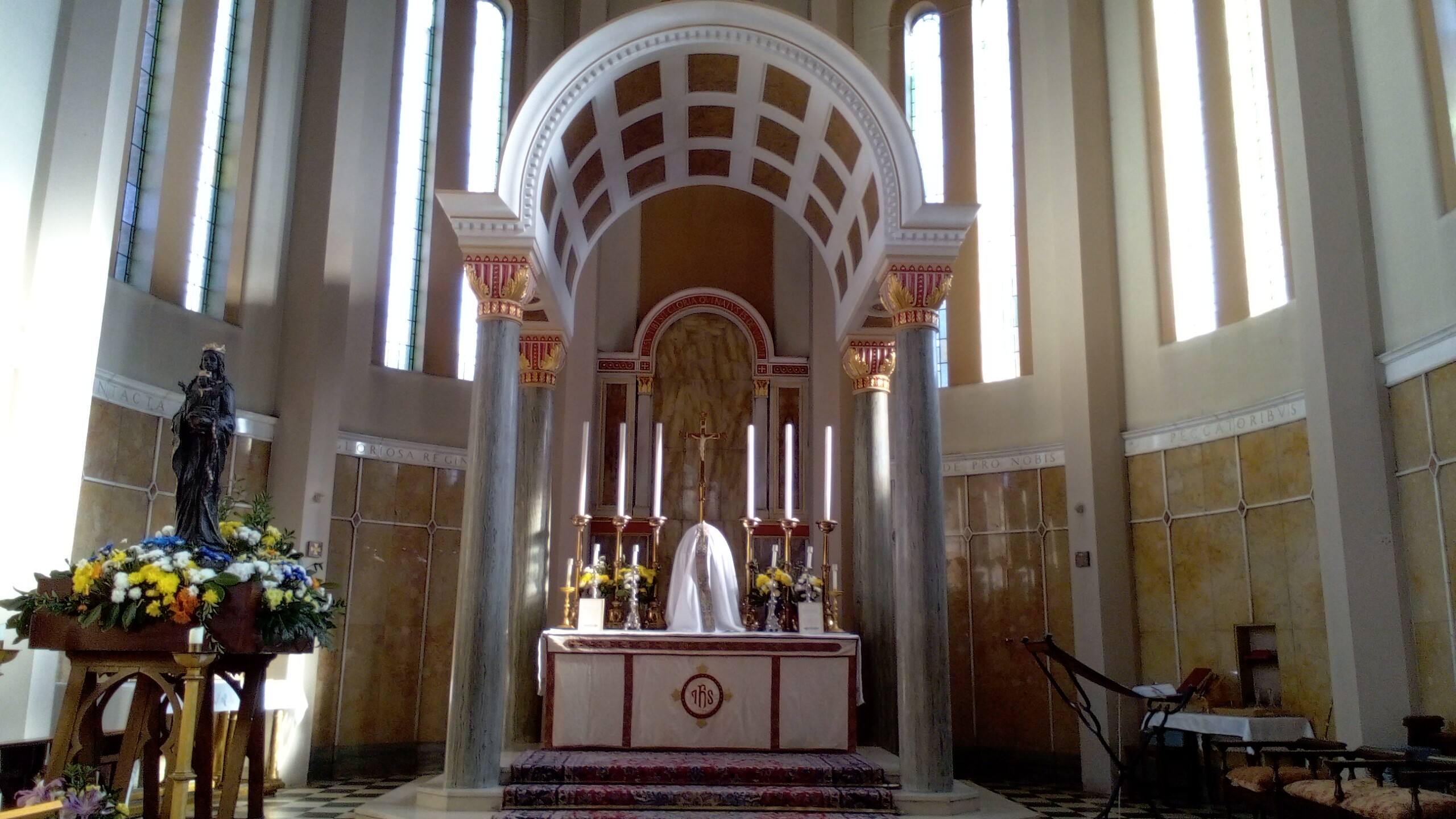
Chancel

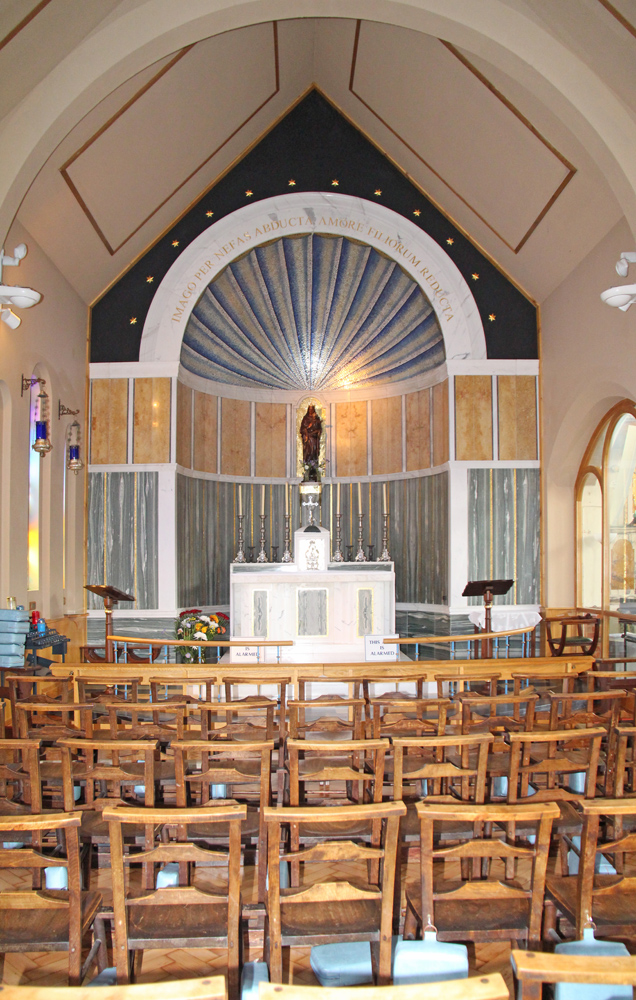
Shrine chapel

== See also ==
- St Mary's Church, Willesden
