= Barnet Tunnel =

Railway tunnel in north London

Coordinates: 51.6295°N 0.1582°W

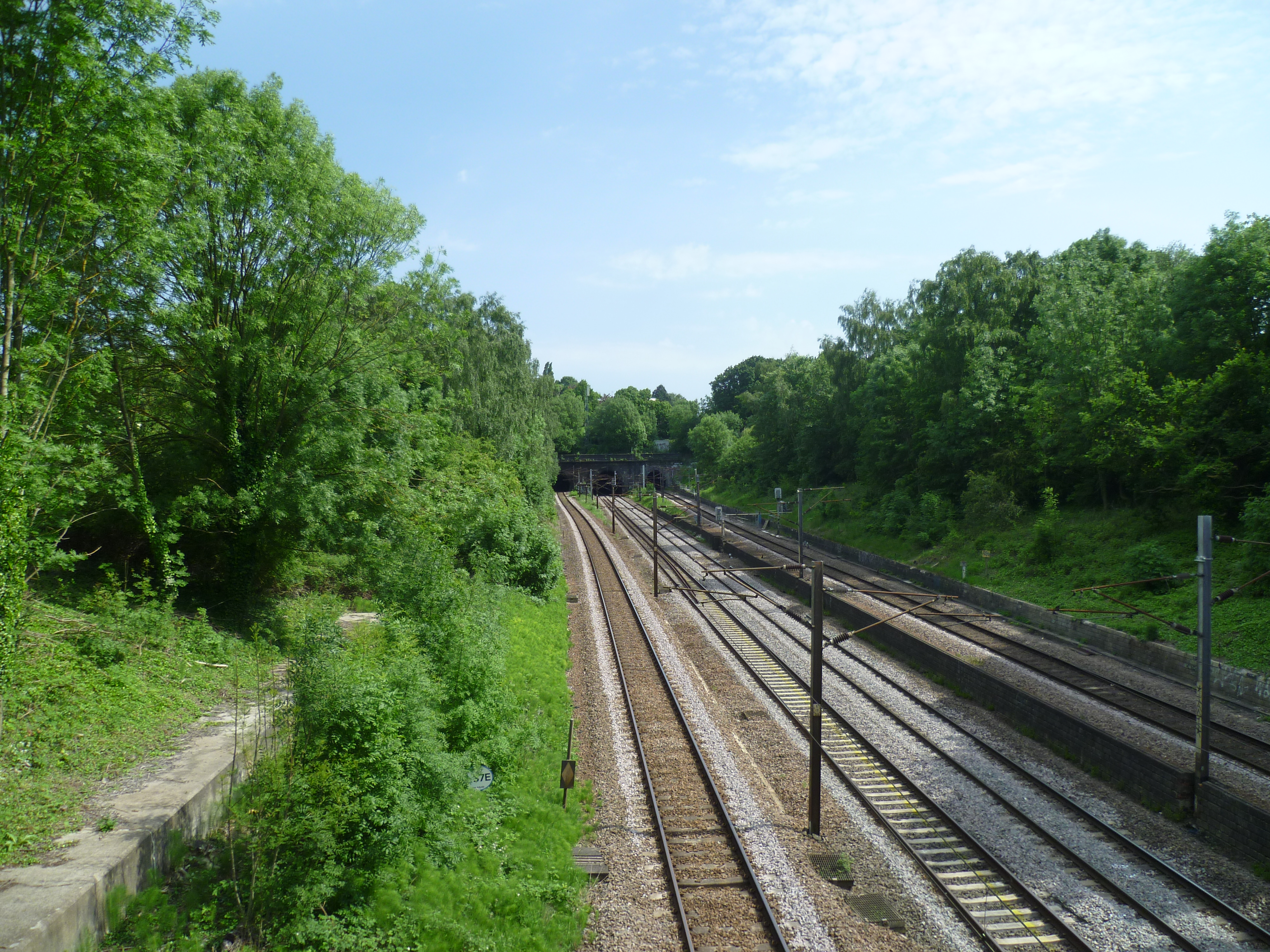
Oakleigh Park Rail Cutting and Barnet Tunnel

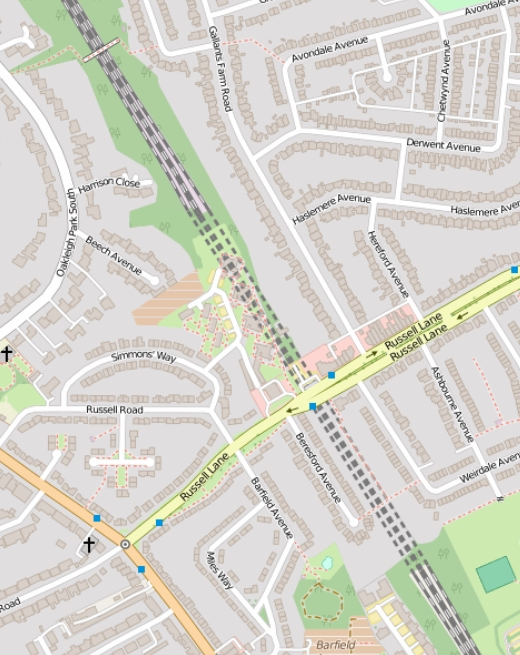
Barnet Tunnel map.

The Barnet Tunnel is a railway tunnel in north London on the East Coast Main Line.

== Location ==
The tunnel is in London Borough of Barnet in north London. It passes under Russell Lane which joins Oakleigh Road North to Brunswick Park Road. The station to the north of the tunnel is Oakleigh Park (1873) and to the south, New Southgate (1850). Immediately to the north of the tunnel is Oakleigh Park Rail Cutting between the tunnel entrance and Oakleigh Park station.

The original name for the tunnel was the East Barnet Tunnel.

The tunnel, along with the other eight between King's Cross and Peterborough, is perfectly straight, unlike most of the line. This is because curved tunnels were not possible with the technology of the time.

The next tunnel up the line is the Wood Green Tunnel and the next tunnel down the line is the Hadley Wood South Tunnel.

== History ==
The tunnel was built as part of the Great Northern Railway from 23 April 1849. It is 605 yards in length.

It is now called Barnet Tunnel, but has also been known as East Barnet Tunnel and Whetstone Tunnel. It was known as Barnet Tunnel in the Great Northern Railway guide for 1912 but the LNER called it Oakleigh Park Tunnel. It reverted to Barnet Tunnel under British Rail.

== Accidents ==
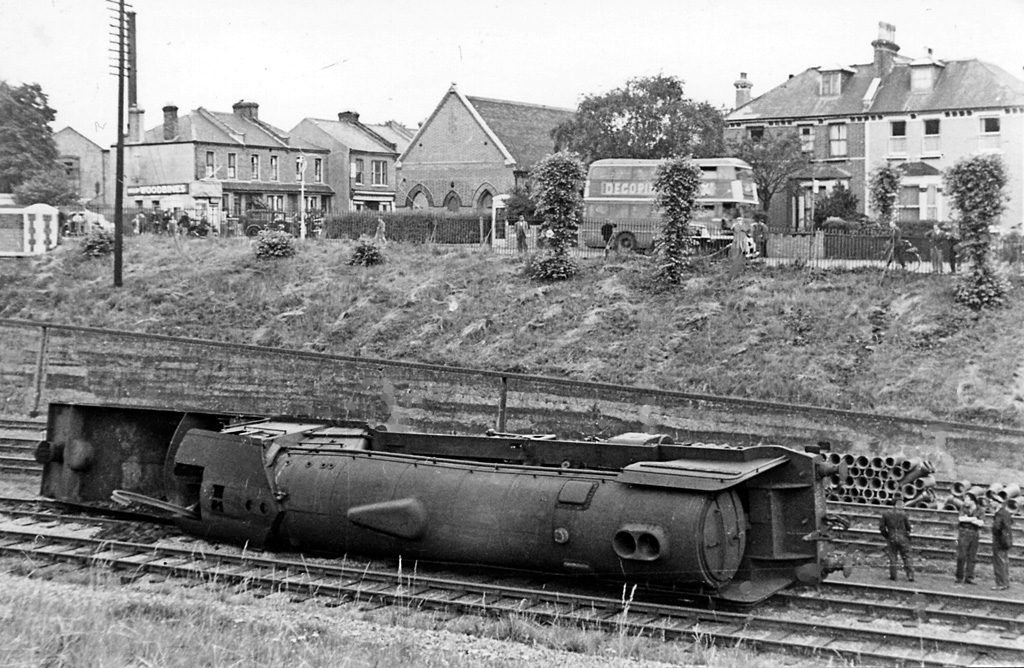
A2/1 No. 60508 Duke of Rothesay lying on its side

On 8 May 1857, a partial derailment of a goods train took place as the train was entering the tunnel. There were no deaths.

At 6.00 am on 17 July 1948, locomotive No. 60508, Duke of Rothesay, was hauling a passenger train from Edinburgh Waverley when it began to derail inside the tunnel due to a combination of faulty track and excessive speed. The whole train was subsequently derailed on points at New Southgate. The driver was only slightly hurt but the fireman was killed after he escaped from the engine but was hit by the following carriages. Ten passengers were injured, none seriously.
