= Mary Immaculate and St Peter, New Barnet =

Roman Catholic church in London, England

Coordinates: 51.6481°N 0.1759°W

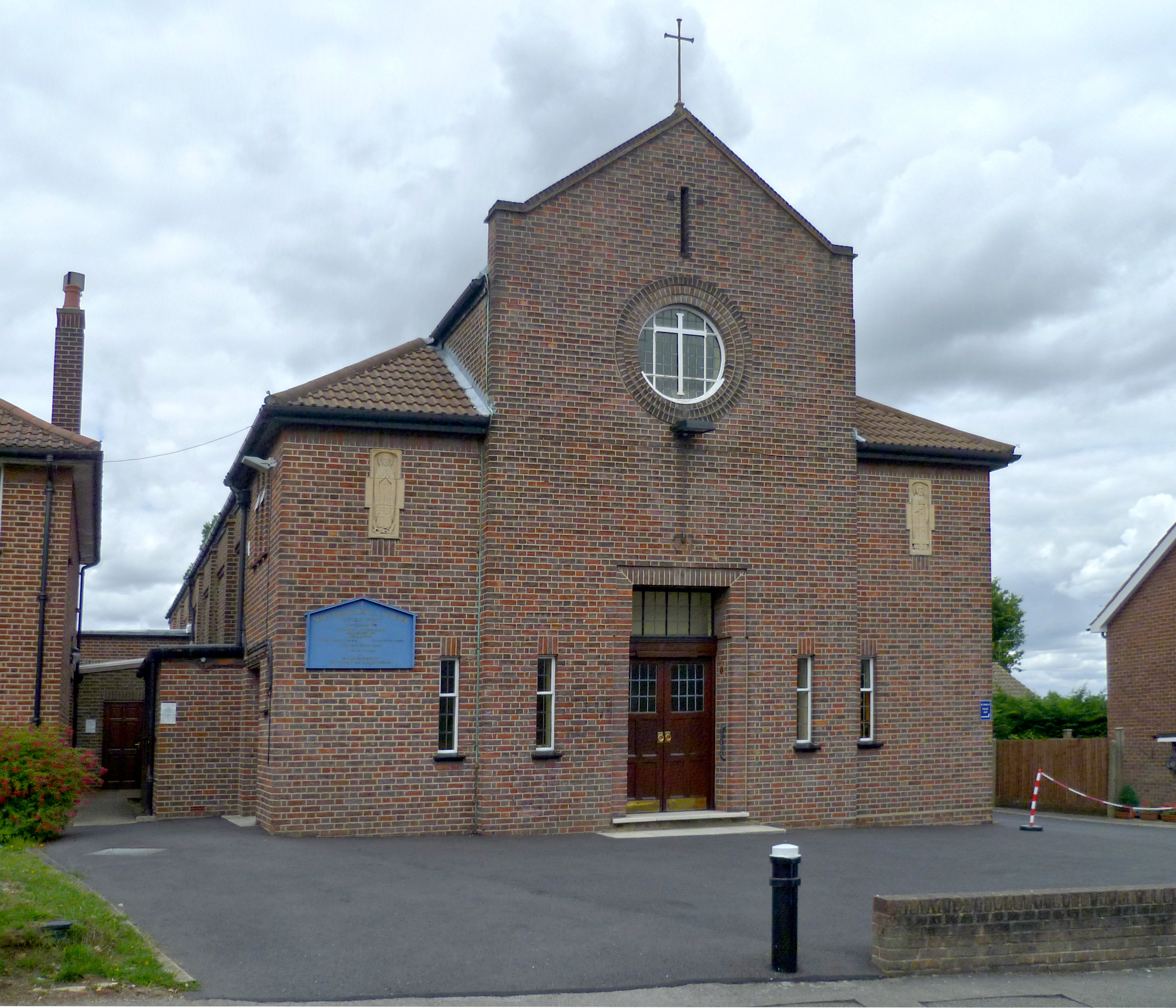
Mary Immaculate and St Peter, New Barnet

Mary Immaculate and St Peter, New Barnet, is a Roman Catholic church in Somerset Road, New Barnet, north London. The church is within the Diocese of Westminster.

== Background ==
New Barnet is a north London suburb that developed around the new Great Northern Railway station that opened in 1850. A number of churches were soon afterwards built in the area, such as the Baptist Church (1872) in Station Road, the Congregational Church (1880) also in Station Road, and the Church of England Holy Trinity Lyonsdown (1866) which is opposite Mary Immaculate and St Peter.

== History ==
The Catholic parish of New Barnet was created in 1912 and the present church built in 1938 to plans by T. H. B. Scott (Thomas Henry Birchall Scott) (1872-1945) FRIBA FRPS an architect who was also the former president of the Royal Photographic Society and who designed many Catholic churches in London. It is described as of simple design, using a rounded arch that was typical of Scott's work.

The church is within the Diocese of Westminster.

The church was built in 1938.
