= St Mary Magdalen Catholic Church, Whetstone =

Catholic parish church in Whetstone, north London, England

Coordinates: 51.630795°N 0.173845°W

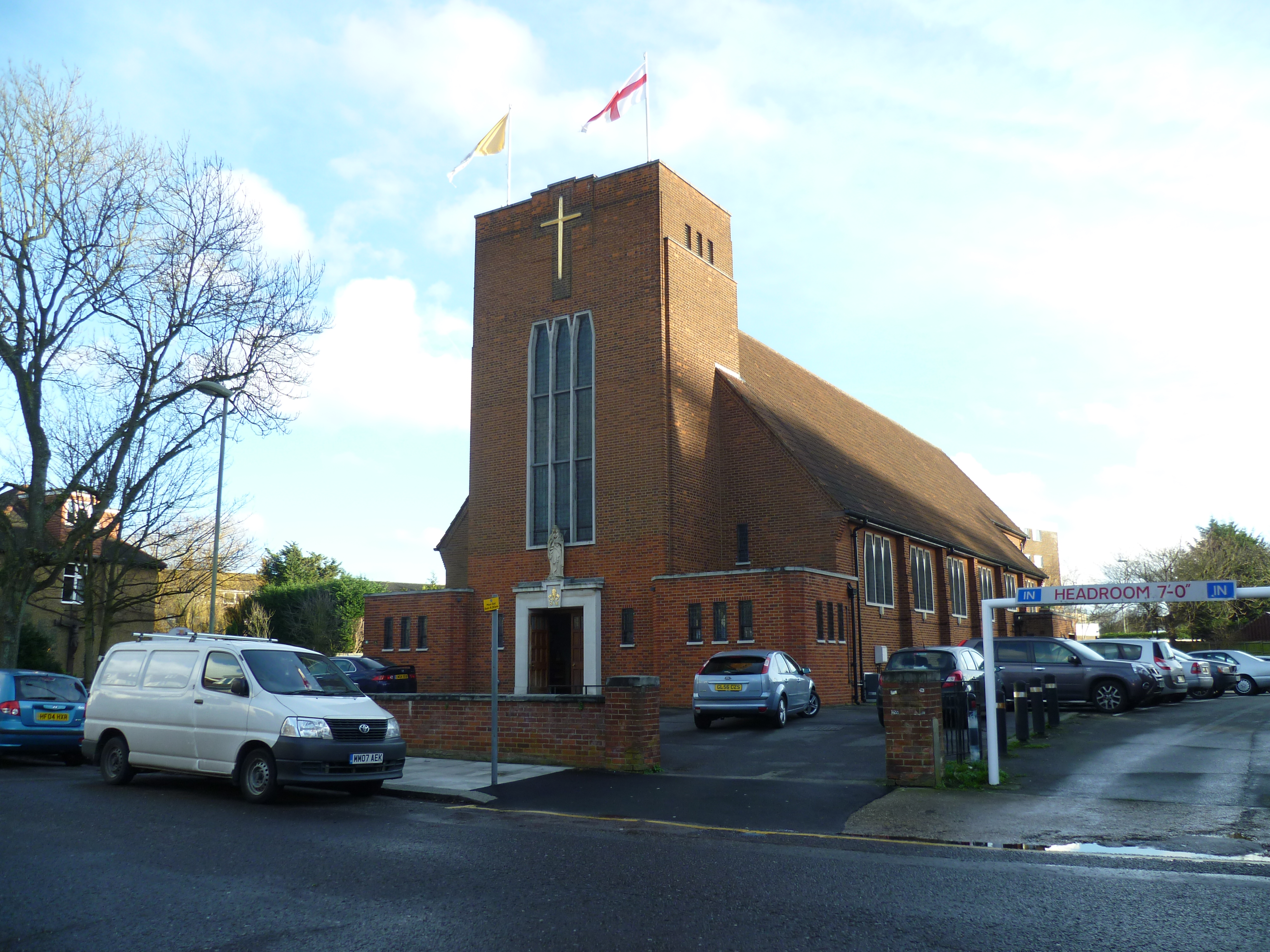
St Mary Magdalen Catholic Church

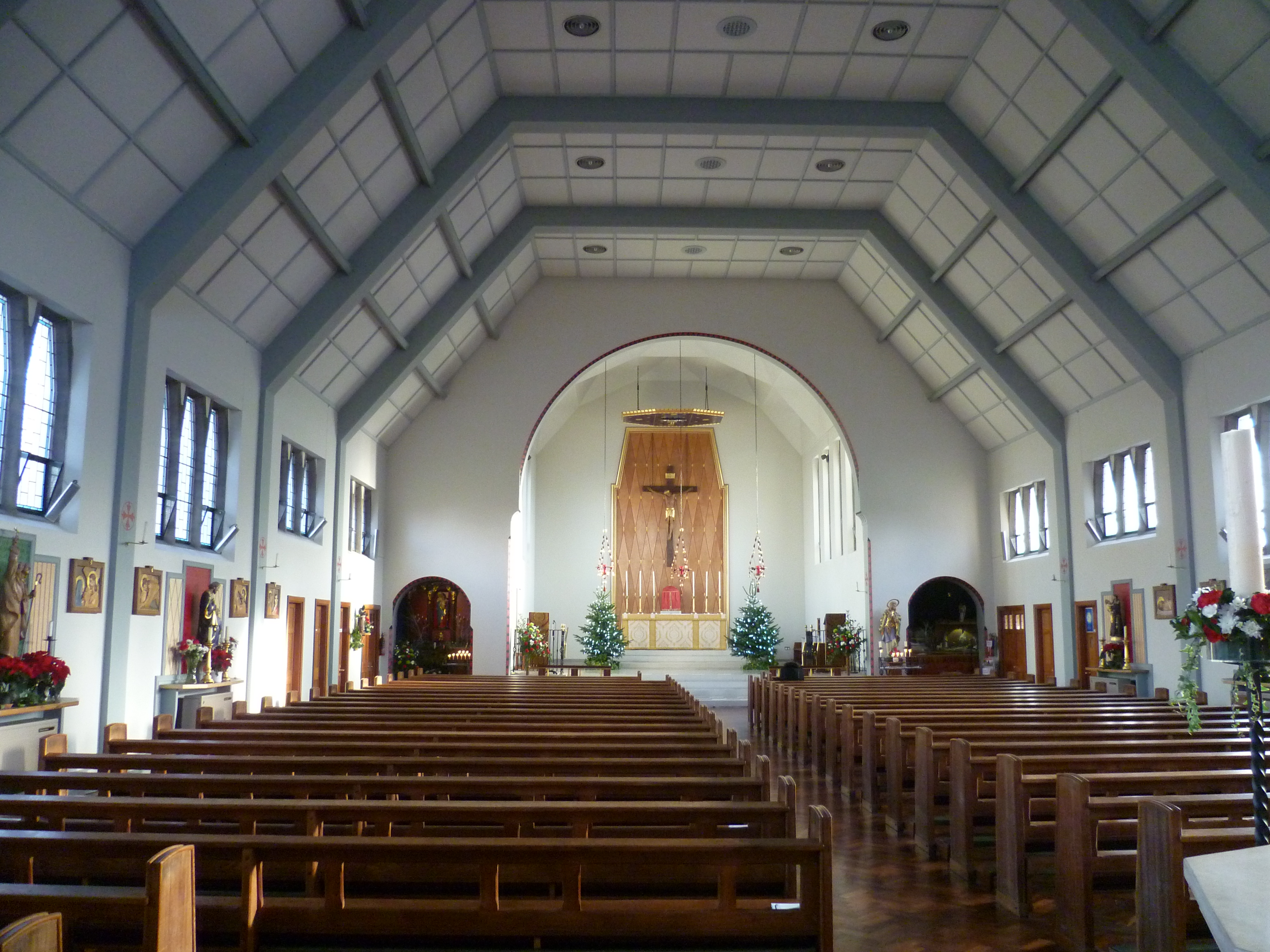
Interior of St Mary Magdalen Catholic Church

St Mary Magdalen Catholic Church is a Catholic parish in the Diocese of Westminster. The parish church is located in Athenaeum Road, Whetstone, north London.

The church was built in 1958 and designed by Wilfrid Clarence Mangan, who also behind the construction of many other churches such as Our Lady of Willesden Church, Our Lady of Sorrows Church, Bognor Regis, and St Joseph's Church, Newbury.
