= Catherine Ironside =

British medical missionary (1870–1921)

Catherine Mary Ironside
- Born: 1870; North Finchley, Middlesex, England
- Died: 11 November 1921 (aged 50–51); Isfahan, Sublime State of Iran
- Education: London School of Medicine for Women
- Occupations: Nurse, missionary

Catherine Mary Ironside OBE (1870–1921) was a medical missionary whose primary work was focused in Iran. Originally trained as a nurse and later on as a midwife, she eventually became a physician after graduating from the London School of Medicine. After graduation, she went to Persia and worked in a variety of hospitals run by the Church Missionary Society.

== Early life ==
Ironside was born in 1870 in North Finchley, Middlesex, England to Mary Cane and Edmund Ironside. Growing up, she lived in a house with her sister Grace Eulie Ironside who later became a local school teacher. Ironside originally trained as a nurse in the Burslem Cottage Hospital which she entered in 1892. In 1895, she went to Clapham Maternity Hospital where she became certified as a midwife. After working as a midwife for several years, she decided to attend the London School of Medicine for Women where she completed her bachelor's degree in medicine in 1903.

== Missionary work ==
In 1905, she went as a medical missionary to work in the women's hospital set up by the Church Missionary Society (CMS) in Isfahan, Persia following Emmeline Stuart who set up the women's hospital there. The hospital consisted of 84 beds in the women's ward and over 100 beds in the men's ward, and relied upon two surgical wings. There were no corridors between the two sections which presented a difficult work environment during the harsher seasons. Upon arriving she began to study the local language and became fluent in her second year, making her an asset to the hospital. Furthermore, she became known for her diagnostic ability as well as the many procedures she performed as a surgeon.

Ironside took time to work at the other CMS hospitals in Yazd, at the Yazd Missionary Clinic, and in Kerman at the Kerman Morsalin Hospital. She worked in Persia for a total of 11 years, although she was driven out with the rest of the European residents in 1915, as a result of the violence emerging from the Persian campaign of World War I.

While on hiatus from her work in Persia, she worked as a medical officer at the London Temperance Hospital and for her work she was awarded the O.B.E or Officer of the Order of the British Empire. On February 21, 1920, Ironside boarded the Morea and headed off to Bombay, from where she made her way back to Persia to continue her missionary work with the Kerman Medical Mission returning again to Isfahan. During her second visit to Kerman, she worked closely with British Officers of the South Persia Rifles, especially the army surgeons.

In 1913, Ironside was one of the first women able to vote in the formerly all-male CMS Standing Committee Conference.

Ironside published works about her experiences, including Open Doors in Persia (1916) and Persian Patients (1921), both of which provide first hand accounts of the medical and missionary work during her life.

== Evangelism ==
Ironside's medical work also had a prominent religious component to it. She was part of the ranks of the Christian Church in Isfahan. She often led regular gospel teachings and sent fellow missionaries to villages in order to lead bible readings and teach religious classes. The CMS strong evangelist mission meant many of the CMS doctors did not work exclusively within the hospitals and would often make home visits to higher ranking individuals in the local tribes, especially the Bakhtiaris, a tent-dwelling tribe who lived in the highlands outside of Ispahan, who not only developed an important relationship with CMS but also with the British.

== Death and legacy ==
On Ironside's final trip to Isfahan in December 1920, she was caught in a snowstorm while on a mountain pass and almost died from exposure. After this exposure, Ironside had declining health and eventually she caught influenza in the epidemic of 1921 and subsequently pneumonia and died on November 11, 1921. She was buried in the Armenian Cathedral in Julfa.

The baptismal font cover in the Christ Church North Finchley is carved in her memory and represents both Christian and Persian cultures.
