= Ernest Lazarus =

Ernest Arthur Lazarus-Barlow (born Ernest Arthur Lazarus; 1855 or 1856 – 9 January 1914) was an English banker and businessman who was the manager of three branches of a French bank in England. He was active in charitable work in north London and was awarded the Légion d'honneur in recognition of his charitable work for the French Hospital in London and other causes related to helping French people in London.

== Family ==
Lazarus was born in De Beauvoir Town, London, in 1855 or 1856 to John Barnett Lazarus (born Russia) and his wife Martha E. Lazarus (née Barlow). John Barnett Lazarus was a Jew who converted to Christianity and worked as a missionary in England. According to family legend, Ernest was able to trace his ancestry to the important Torah scholar of the Middle Ages, Moses Maimonides, through his father and to the writer Sarah Trimmer through his mother. His brother, Walter Sydney Lazarus-Barlow (1865–1950), was professor of experimental pathology at the Middlesex Hospital. In 1894, Ernest Lazarus married Kate Emily Saunders in Islington. They had three children: Kate E., Arthur J., and Elsie M. Lazarus.

At the time of the 1901 census, he was living on Fortis Green Road with his wife and three children and was described as a bank manager. The family employed six servants.

In 1910, when he was living at Winton, Woodside Park, London, and The Grove, West Mersea, Lazarus added his mother's maiden name of Barlow to his own by deed poll, becoming Ernest Arthur Lazarus-Barlow.

== Career ==
Lazarus was working as a clerk at the time of the 1871 census when he was aged 15. Around 1893 he was appointed the manager of the branch of a French bank Comptoir National d'Escompte in London, and he also developed branches in Manchester and Liverpool. He was appointed to the main board of the bank in France.

He was chairman of the Thomson-Houston Company at the time when that company supplied much of the equipment of the Central London Railway (built 1896–1900), now known as the Central Line. In 1898, he was one of the promoters of a bill in the House of Commons for the incorporation of a company to acquire land at Sookholme, near Warsop, on which to construct electricity generating equipment.

== Recreations ==
In 1905, Lazarus helped the Wilderness Golf Club acquire land to the west of Blackett's Brook, adjacent to Manor House Farm in Friern Barnet, which was subsequently combined with John Miles's Manor House Farm estate to become the North Middlesex Golf Club.

He was a prominent member of the City Liberal Club and, not long before his death, was elected master of the Fanmakers' Company. He was a keen yachtsman, sailing his own boat off West Mersea, and was a member of the Corinthian and Southampton Yacht Clubs.

== Philanthropy ==
Lazarus was active in charitable work in north London and was the first treasurer and later chairman of the French Hospital in London. In 1913, he met the French president, Raymond Poincaré, on the occasion of his visit to the hospital. He was awarded the Légion d'honneur in recognition of his charitable work helping French people in London.

== Death and legacy ==
Lazarus died of an "apoplectic stroke" on 9 January 1914, at West Mersea. His funeral was at Marylebone Cemetery, with a memorial service at St. John's Church, Whetstone. He lived at Smiths Hall, West Mersea, Essex. In 1918, his family donated the current east window to the parish church of St. Edmund King and Martyr, East Mersea, on the subject of the feast of the Epiphany.
