= Walter Sydney Lazarus-Barlow =

British professor of experimental pathology (1865–1950)

Walter Sydney Lazarus-Barlow FRCP (born Walter Sydney Lazarus; 18 July 1865 – 15 January 1950) was an English physician who was professor of experimental pathology at the Middlesex Hospital. He was a specialist in cancer and was one of the first physicians to research the effects of X-rays and radium on that disease. In 1909, he gave the Croonian Lecture on the subject of Radioactivity and Carcinoma.

== Early life ==
Lazarus-Barlow was born to John Barnett Lazarus, a Russian-born Jew who converted to Christianity, and his wife Martha E. Lazarus (née Barlow). At the age of 21, he added his mother's maiden name to his own by deed poll. According to family legend, he was able to trace his ancestry to the important Torah scholar of the Middle Ages Moses Maimonides through his father, and to the writer Sarah Trimmer through his mother. His brother was the banker and businessman Ernest Lazarus (1855 or 1856–1914).

Lazarus-Barlow was educated at the City of London School and entered Downing College, Cambridge on a scholarship in 1884 from where he obtained his MB.

== Family ==
He married Minnie Wesson Taylor Mears on 17 January 1893 at St Saviour's church, Hanley Road. At the time of their golden wedding anniversary in 1943 they were living at Smith's Hall, West Mersea, Essex. They had a son, Percy, also a pathologist.

== Career ==
Lazarus-Barlow's first professional appointment was as a house physician at Brompton Hospital and assistant curator at the St George's Hospital museum under Humphry Rolleston. He was a principal translator of Samuel Pozzi's Treatise on Gynaecology which was published in three volumes by the New Sydenham Society in 1892–93. He returned to Cambridge where he obtained a post as demonstrator in pathology in 1893 before moving back to St George's Hospital where he was curator of the museum there and also held the post of lecturer in pathology at Westminster Hospital. During a postmortem examination at the hospital, he pricked his left thumb, thereby contracting an infection which led to the amputation of his left arm in 1901. Walter O'Connor writes in British Physiologists 1885–1914, that Lazarus-Barlow's life was "probably saved by the new antistreptococcal serum from the Pasteur Institute, used for the first time in Britain".

Lazarus-Barlow began his specialism in cancer research when he was appointed director of the newly established Cancer Research Laboratory at the Middlesex Hospital in 1903. He was one of the first physicians to research the effects of X-rays and radium on that disease and his use of living cells in his work achieved international recognition. In 1909 he gave the Croonian Lecture on Radioactivity and Carcinoma. He served as a captain in the Royal Army Medical Corps from 1914 to 1918, spending two years in France, before returning to the Middlesex where he was appointed professor of experimental pathology in 1920. He retired in 1924.

He became a member of the Physiological Society in 1896 and was elected a fellow of the Royal College of Physicians in 1901.

== Later life ==
In retirement, Lazarus-Barlow gardened and edited the medical section of the 14th edition of the Encyclopaedia Britannica, writing several of the articles himself, including the entry on "Cancer Research". He was a member of the Grand Council of the British Empire Cancer Campaign (founded 1923). He died in a nursing home in Bexhill on 15 January 1950. He was survived by his wife and son and left an estate of £5782.

== Selected publications ==
- A manual of general pathology for students and practitioners. J. & A. Churchill, London, 1898. (2nd 1904)
- The elements of pathological anatomy and histology for students. J. & A. Churchill, London, 1903.
