= St Mary's Church, Willesden =

Coordinates: 51.549°N 0.2499°W

St Mary's Church
- Shrine of Our Lady of Willesden
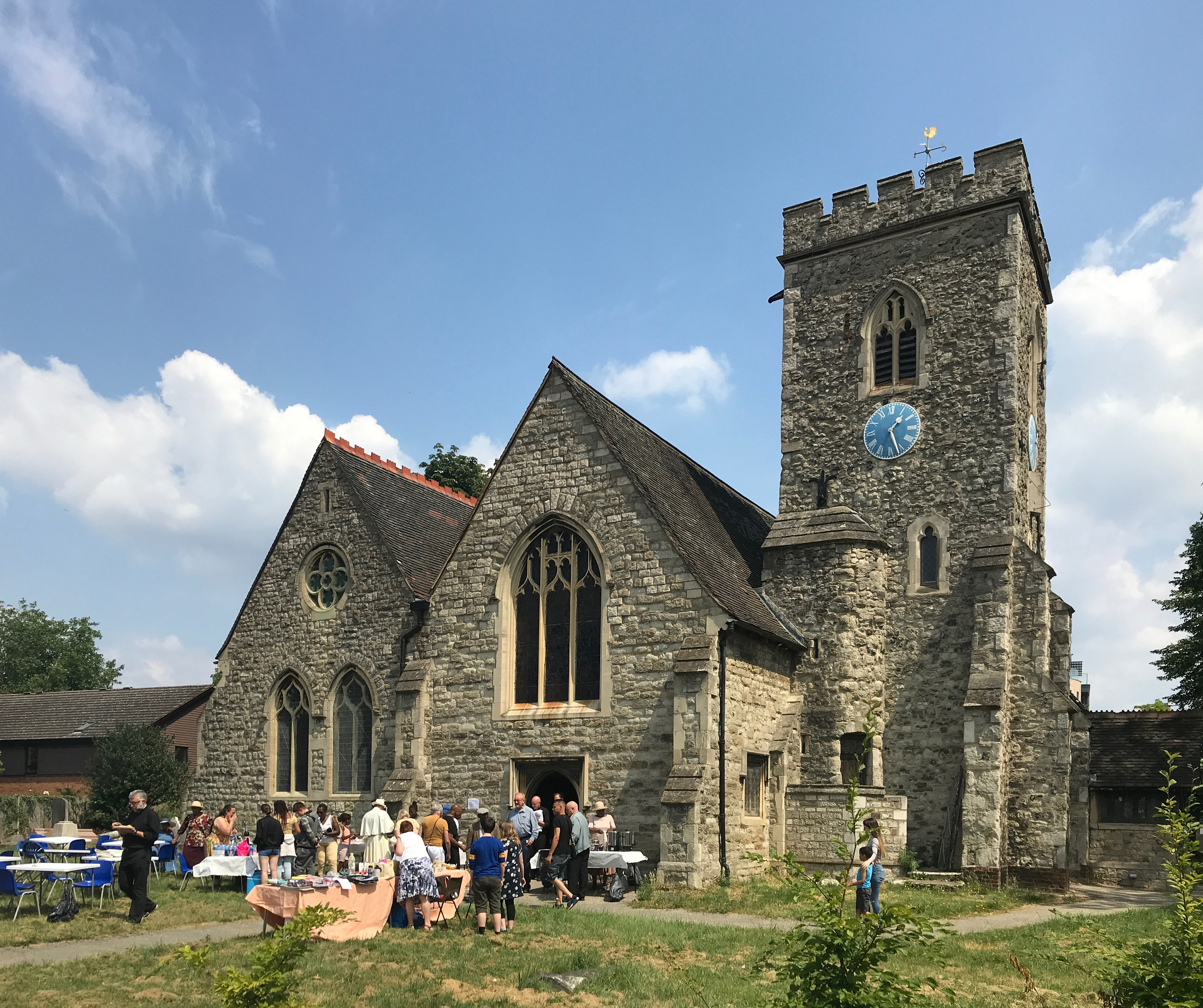
- St Mary's Church
- Location: Willesden
- Country: England
- Denomination: Anglican
- Website: ShrineofMary.org

History
- Status: Parish church
- Dedication: Mary, mother of Jesus
- Consecrated: 30 June 1852

Architecture
- Functional status: Active
- Heritage designation: Grade II*
- Designated: 26 July 1951
- Style: English Gothic
- Years built: 13th century onwards

Administration
- Province: Canterbury
- Diocese: London
- Archdeaconry: Northolt
- Deanery: Brent
- Parish: Willesden

St Mary's Church is a Church of England parish church on Neasden Lane, in Neasden, Willesden, Borough of Brent, London. Since 938, there has been a church on its site. The building itself dates from the 13th century, with restorations done to it in 1850, 1872 and 1893. From the 13th century, there was a shrine to Our Lady of Willesden, which although destroyed in the English Reformation was restored at the beginning of the 20th century.

== History ==
According to the parish, there was a place of worship on the site of the church since 938. In 1181, it was recorded that there was a church there. Monks from Old St Paul's Cathedral in London travelled to Willesden and wrote about the church and what it contained. In 1200, the monks again visited the church and recorded that the church had been enlarged with side aisles and a tower added.

The monks from St Paul's Cathedral did the records because the Dean of St Paul's and his chapter owned the rectory. Their ownership came from Æthelstan who either gave the land to them or confirmed its transferral to clergy of St Paul's. In 1217, the rectory was rented to the Archdeacon of Middlesex for life. The annual cost was stated as 10 marks. The clergy at St Paul's also appointed the vicar to the church. In 1249, the rectory is first mentioned in records as were two statues of Mary, Mother of Jesus. In 1297, records show that the church had a large wooden crucifix connected to images of Mary and St John the Evangelist. There were also images next to it of St John the Baptist, St Nicholas, and St Catherine. In the late Medieval period, devotion grew up around the church dedicated to Our Lady of Willesden, and was tied to the existence of a holy well or spring of water that existed on the site of the church. With that devotion came donations and the church was notably well-furnished, before the English Reformation removed some of the interior objects.

In the 1538, during the English Reformation, and the reign of Henry VIII, the statue of Our Lady of Willesden was taken out of the church and set on fire in Chelsea. In 1550, more objects were taken from the church, such as vestments, altar cloths, and a chalice. Nevertheless, not all was taken. After the English Civil War, William Roberts was the local member of parliament. A roundhead and supporter of Oliver Cromwell, he bought what were the church lands in Neasden and around Willesden. From the late 1600s to the mid-1800s, clergy from St Paul's Cathedral were appointed as vicars of the church, but rarely came to Willesden. In 1807, the vestry in Willesden asked them to come to the parish more often and to have a priest live there, but they were refused saying that there was not enough money to do so. A resident curate was only appointed after the parish had a collection to raise the funds. Thereafter started a series of initiatives from the church. In the 1870s, more church services were added, and a parish magazine was started. In the 1880s, a young men's institute, temperance society, and a choral association were founded. In 1911, the post of the Bishop of Willesden was created.

== Shrine ==
In the Middles Ages, one of the statues of Saint Mary, described as 'in colour like ebony, of ancient workmanship', became a source of pilgrimage to the church. So much so that from 1475 to 1538, the church was nationally recognised as a place for pilgrims, with miracles being attributed to the statue. However, in 1539, the statue was destroyed. Devotion to Our Lady of Willesden was also linked to the holy well found near the church. During the Reformation, this fell in disuse and its location was lost. However, in the 20th century, efforts were made to revive the devotion. The Bishop of Willesden, Graham Leonard (who became Bishop of London in 1981), actively supported pilgrimages to the church. In 1972, a new Our Lady of Willesden statue was created and installed in the church in the original location of the shrine. It was sculpted by Catharni Stern. In 1998, the holy well was found and used again.

== Building ==
In the church is a baptismal font dating to the mid 12th-century. It is one of six Norman fonts in Middlesex. There are two columns that were built in the mid-1200s that survive in the church. In addition, the chancel was rebuilt in the 1300s, and the stonework from that construction still exists. The southwest tower was built around the same time as the chancel. By the end of the 1840s, parts of the church needed to be repaired. The church congregation voted to repair the building instead of demolishing it and building a new one. From 1850 to 1852, repairs were done on the exterior. The chancel was repaired and the church was extended westwards. In 1872, a restoration was done on the church. The chapel, north aisle and porch were added and the western gallery was demolished. On the outside of the church, whitewash was removed, and the tower was able to be accessed from inside the church. In the 1890s, the roof was repaired.

== Interior ==
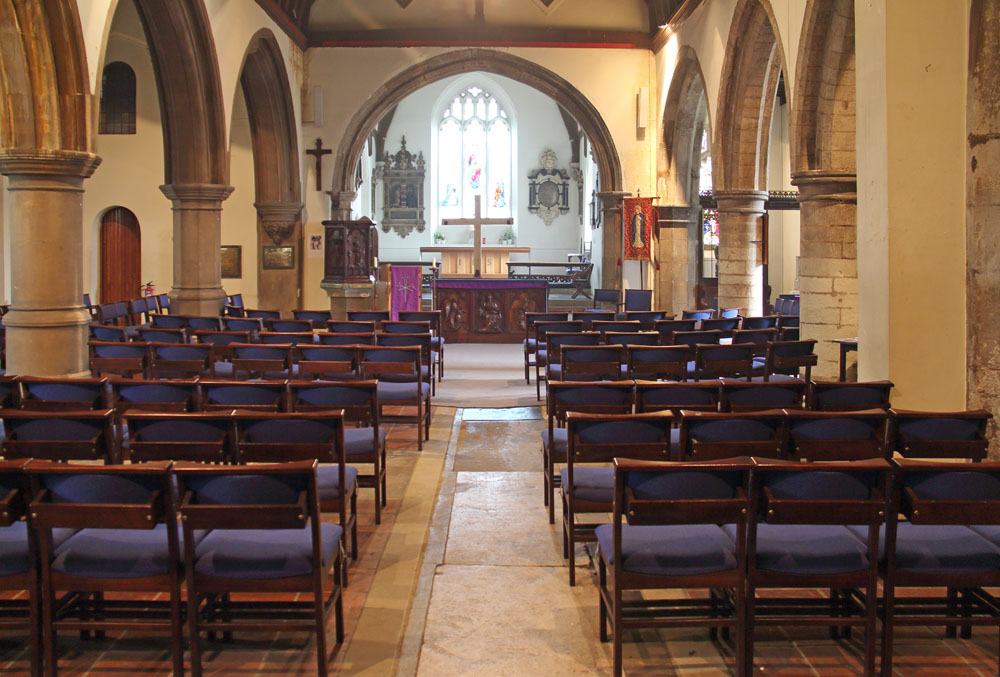
Interior

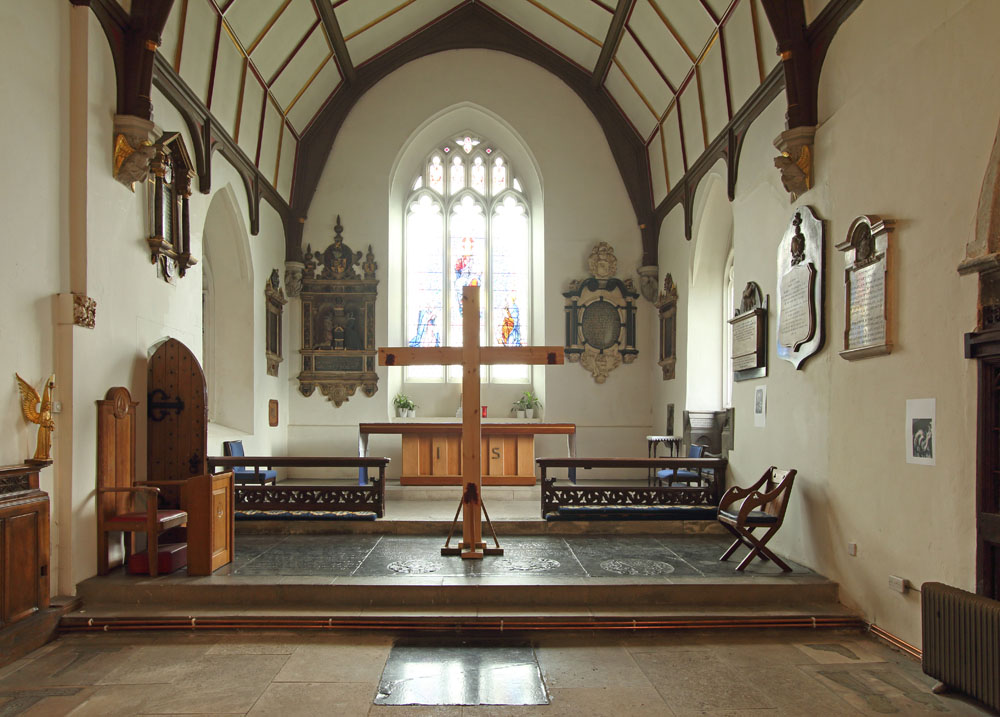
Chancel

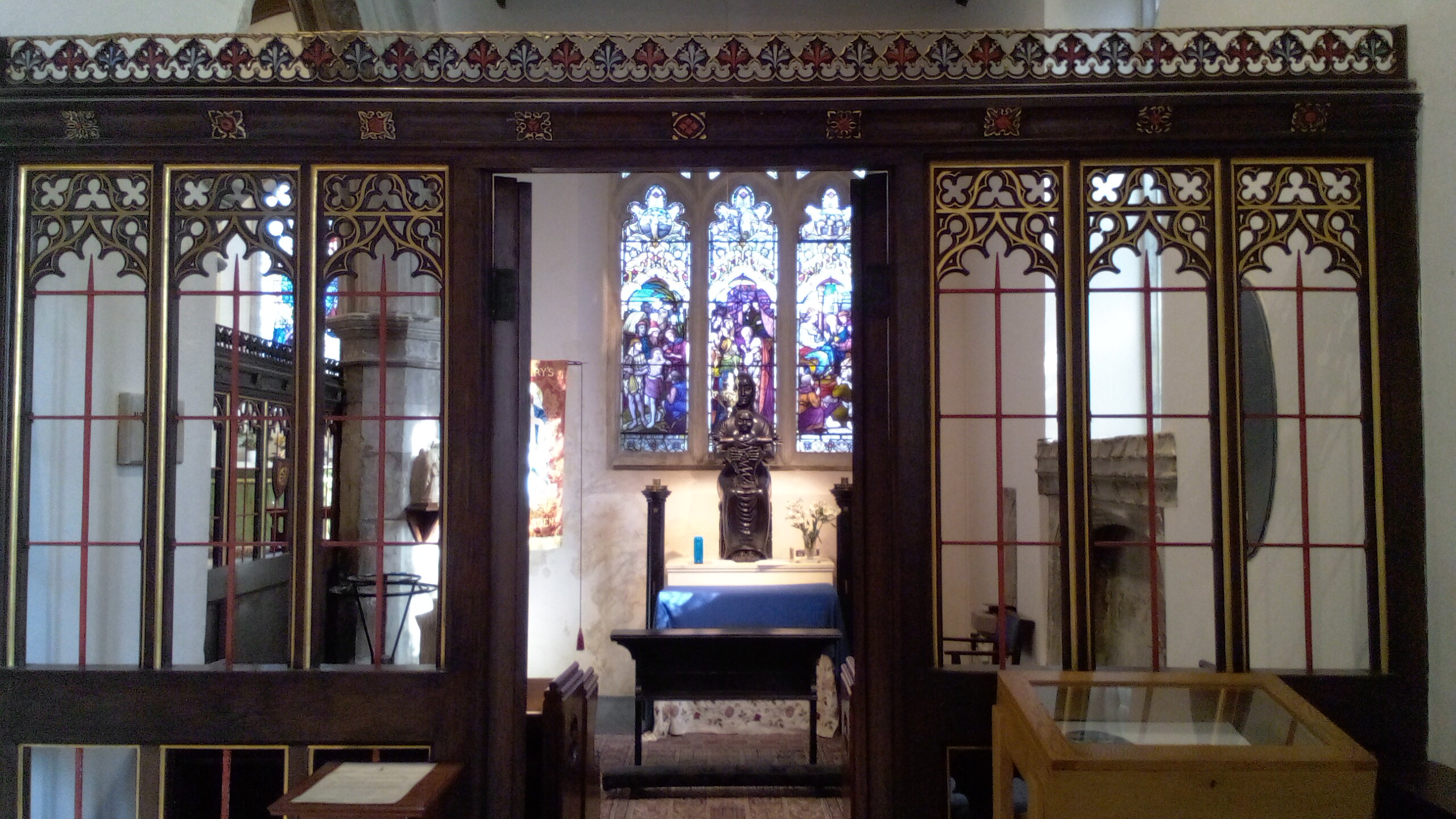
Shrine chapel

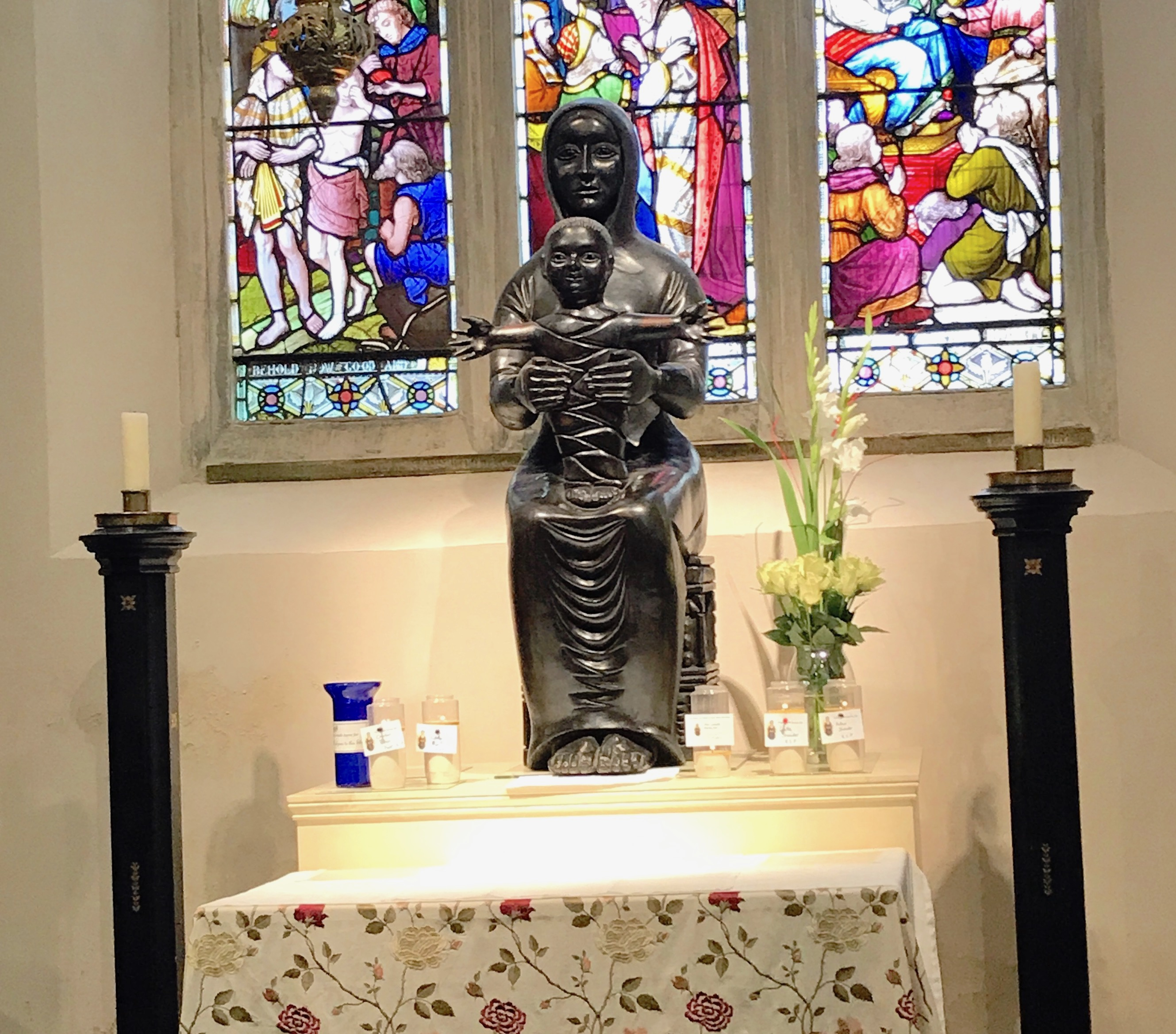
Shrine statue

== See also ==
- Our Lady of Willesden Church
