= All Saints' Church, Oakleigh Park =

Church in Oakleigh Park, London, England

Coordinates: 51.6292°N 0.1664°W

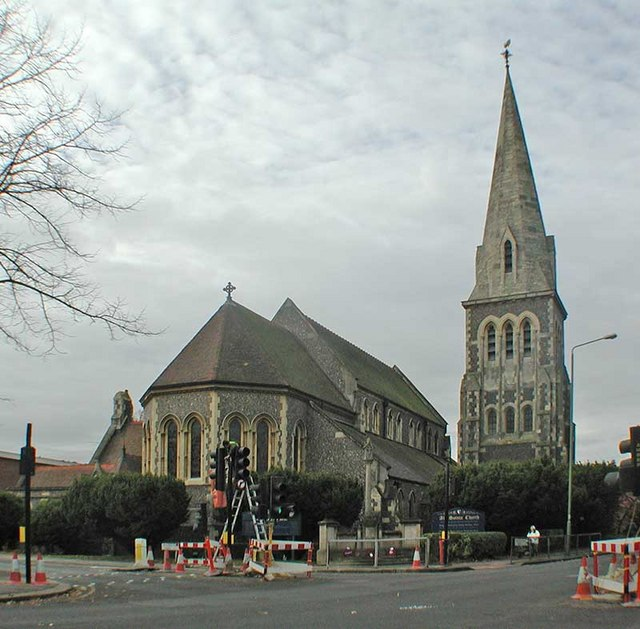
All Saints' Church from the east.

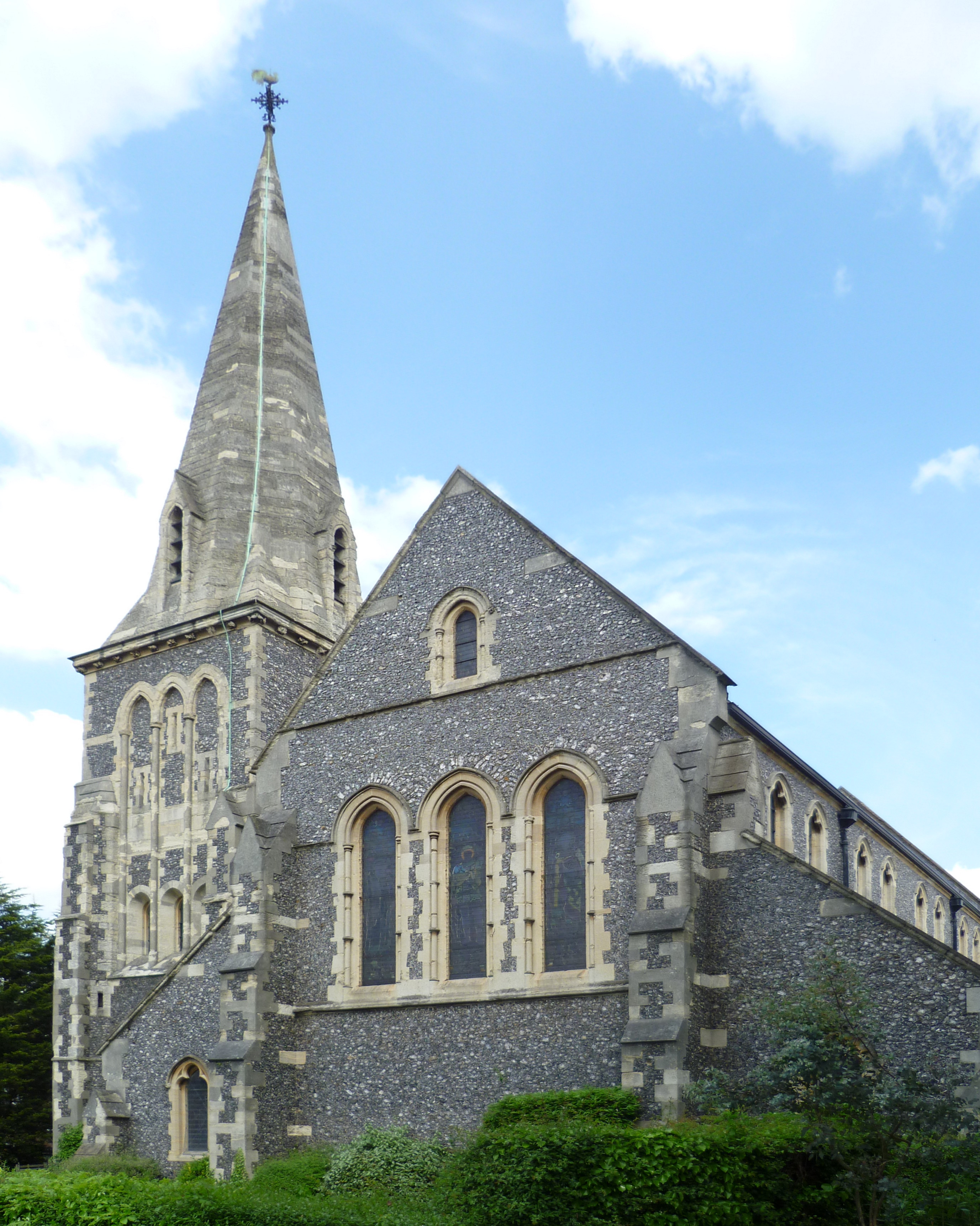
All Saints' Church from the west.

All Saints' Church is a Church of England church in Oakleigh Road North, Oakleigh Park, London. The church is sometimes referred to as All Saints' Friern Barnet. It is a grade II listed building.

== Construction ==
The construction of the church was paid for by local land-owner John Miles who also donated the land on which it stands. He also provided the parish hall and the vicarage in Myddleton Park.

== Architecture ==
The church was built in around 1883 to an Early English Gothic Revival design by the architect Joseph Clarke. The body of the church consists of a nave with north and south aisles and an apsidal chancel, and there is a tower with a spire at the north-west corner. The building is faced in flint with ashlar dressings. The interior has murals by Thomas Gambier Parry.

== War memorials ==
Inside the church are a number of plaques to the dead of the world wars. Inside the porch is a Roll of Honour to the dead of the First World War. Outside, on the corner of Oakleigh Road North and Myddelton Park road, is a memorial to the dead of both wars, known as the All Saints Church Parishioners war memorial, whose names are inscribed inside the church.

== Gallery ==
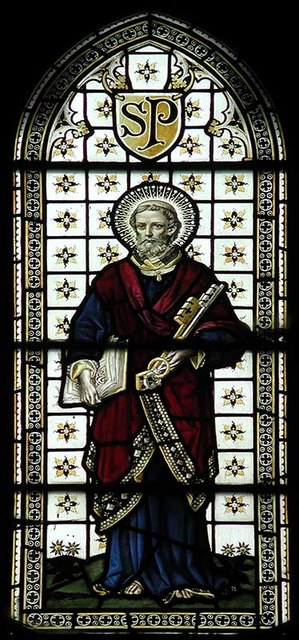
Stained glass.

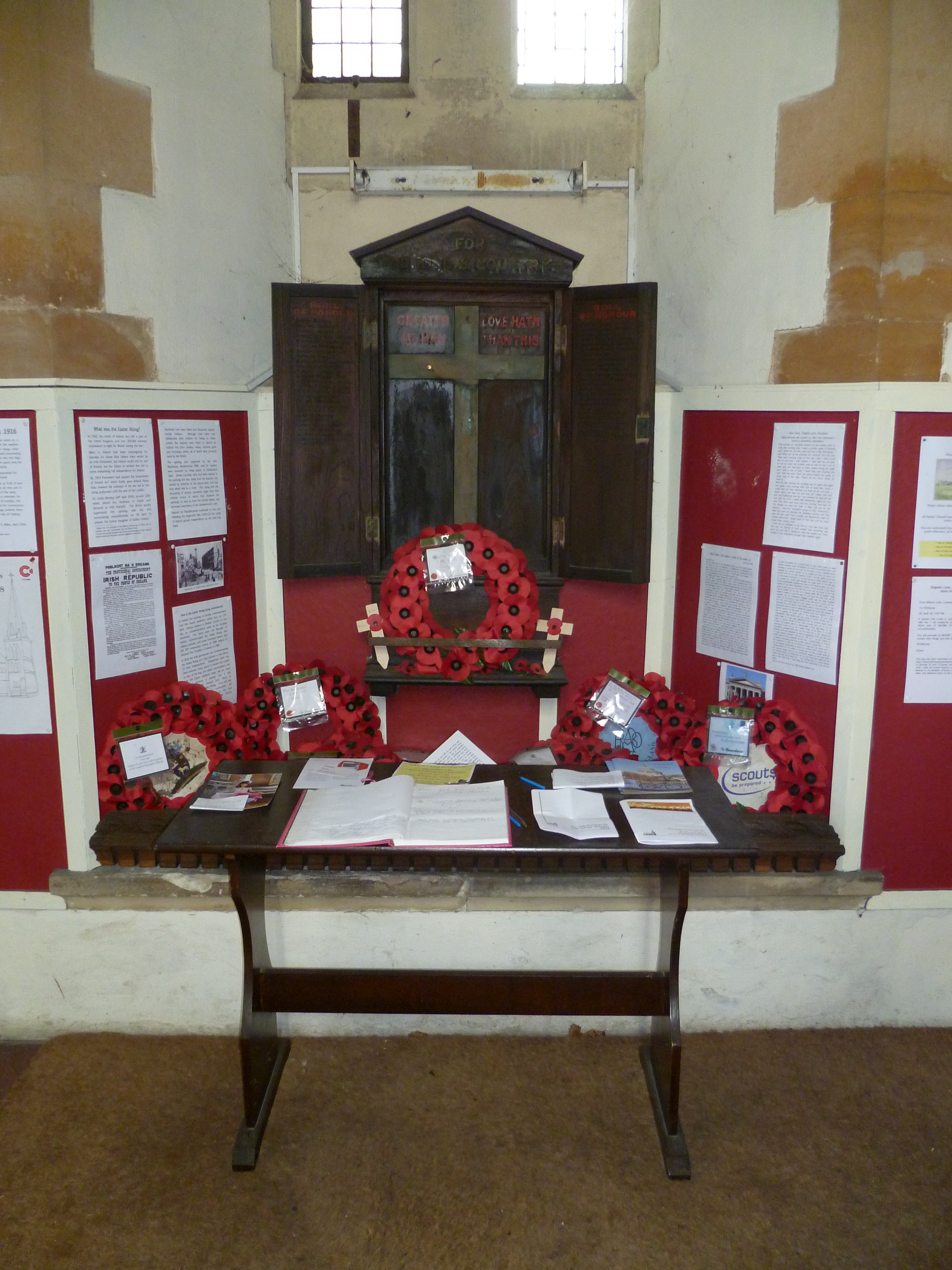
The First World War Roll of Honour inside the porch.

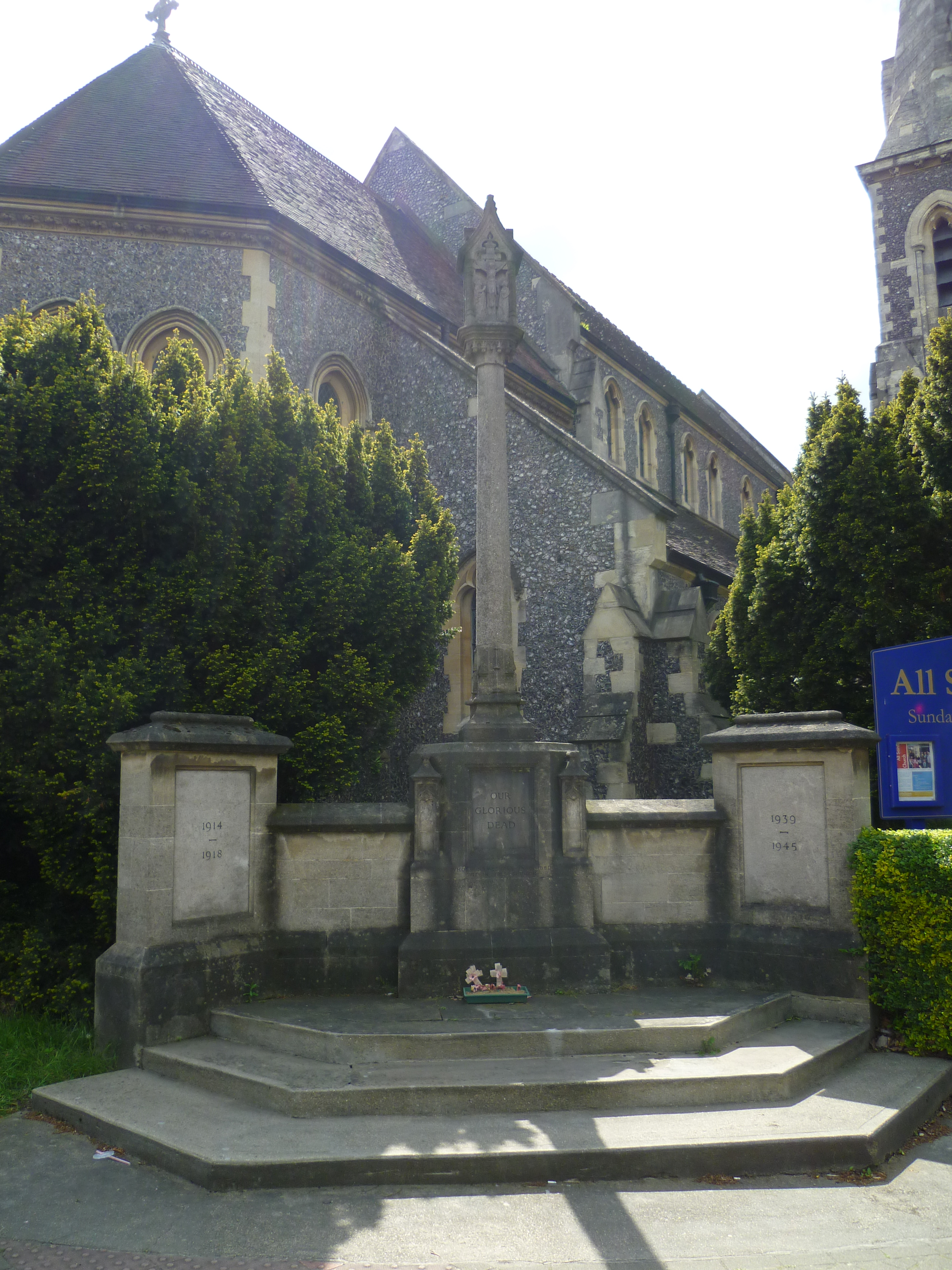
All Saints Church Parishioners war memorial.
