= East Finchley Baptist Church =

Church in East Finchley, London, England

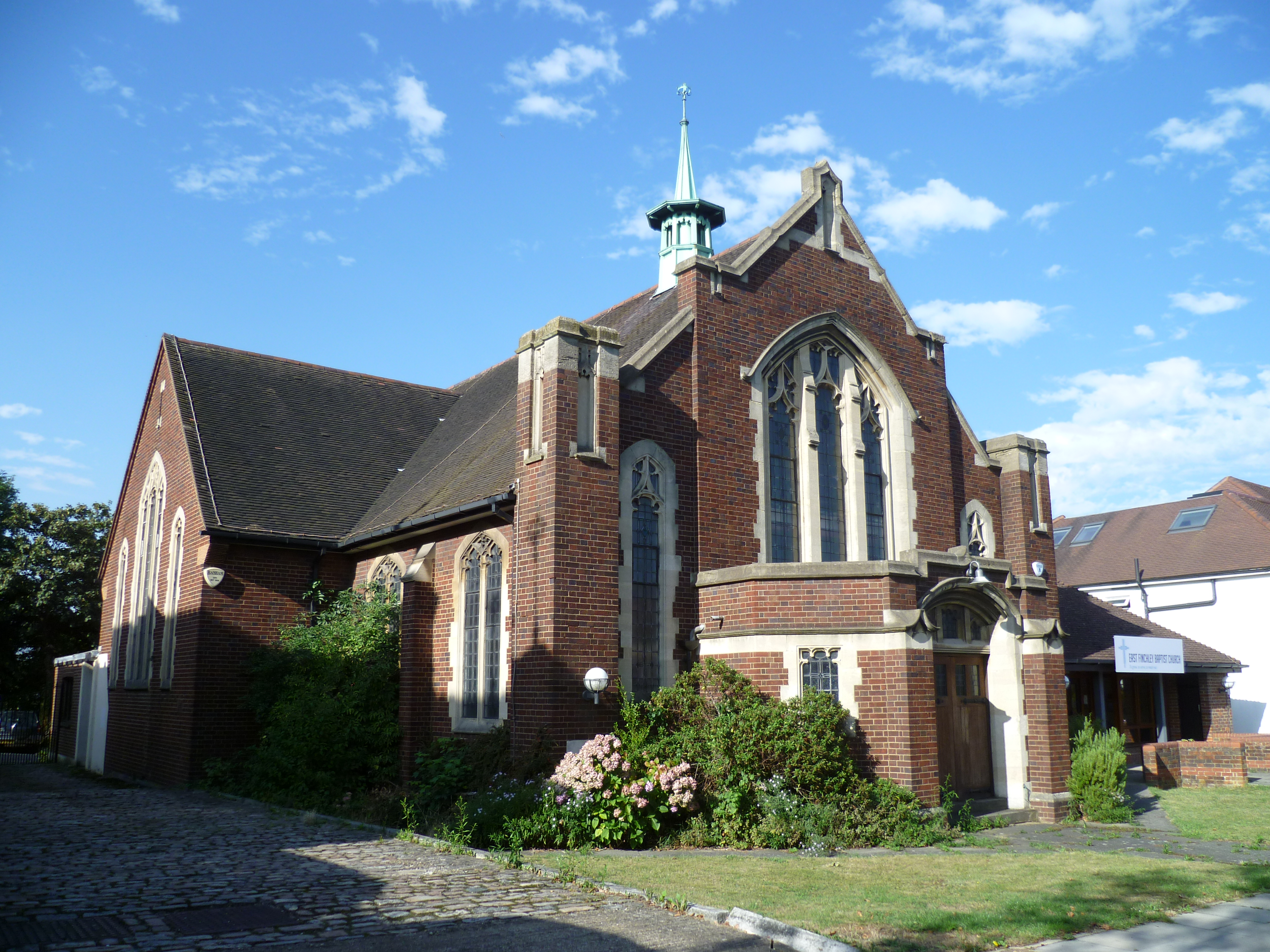
East Finchley Baptist Church

East Finchley Baptist Church is a Baptist church in Creighton Avenue, East Finchley, London. It was built in 1931 and replaced the former church next door which was converted to a church hall and is a grade II listed building with Historic England. The church hall was later converted to flats known as Ashlar Court.
