= New Barnet Friends Meeting House =

Quaker meeting house in London, England

Coordinates: 51°39′0″N 0°10′45.2″W

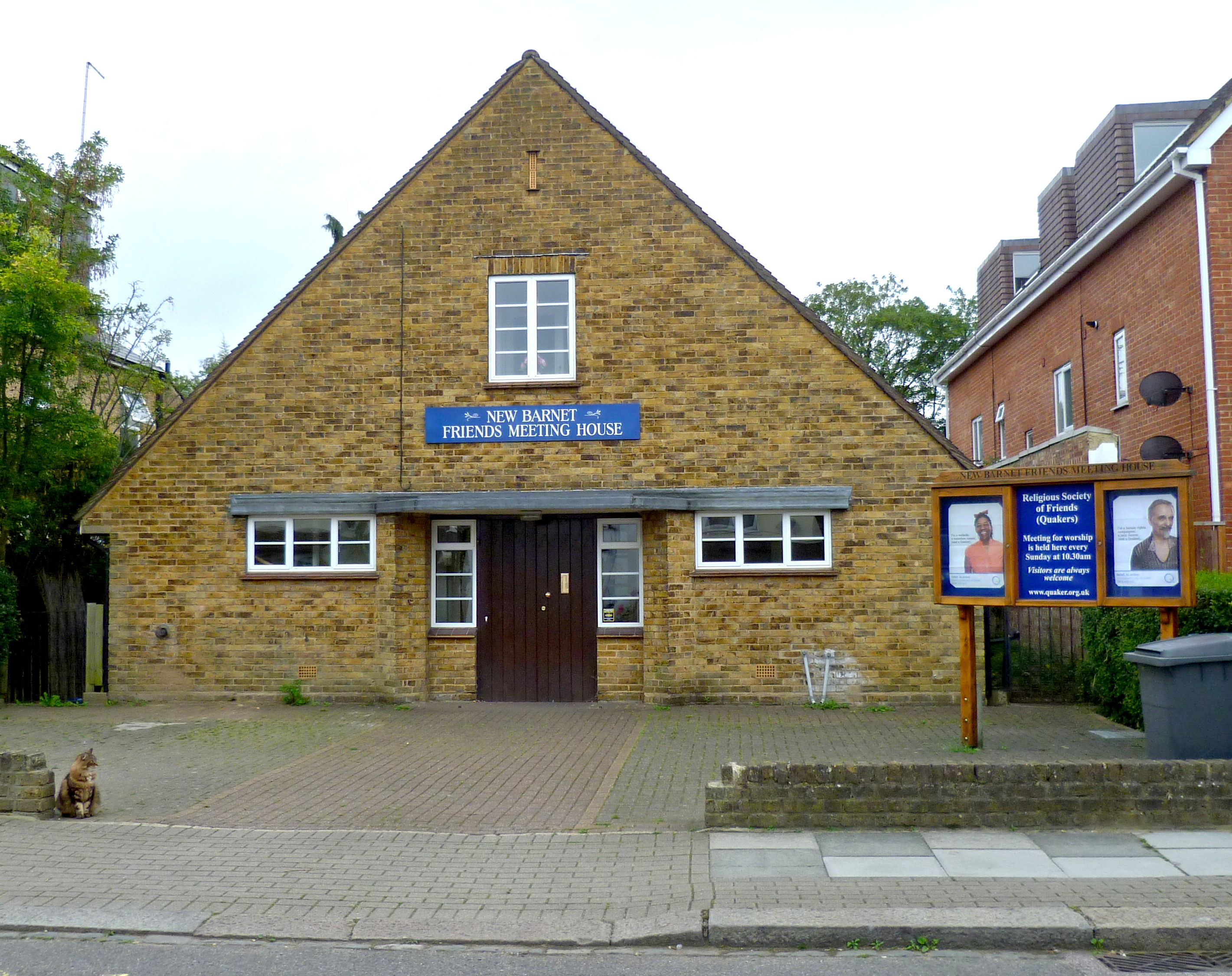
New Barnet Friends Meeting House

New Barnet Friends Meeting House is a Quaker meeting house in Leicester Road, New Barnet, north London, England. It was designed by Leonard Brown, who also designed Quaker meeting houses in Peterborough and Colchester and worked on Letchworth Garden City.

Quakers are known in Hertfordshire, of which New Barnet was once a part, from around 1655. A Quaker meeting has taken place in New Barnet since at least 1873 when its proceedings were reported in the Christian Age, the Baptist, and The Herald of Peace. The New Barnet meeting house opened in the 1930s.
