= Oakleigh Park railway station =

National Rail station in London, England

Oakleigh Park
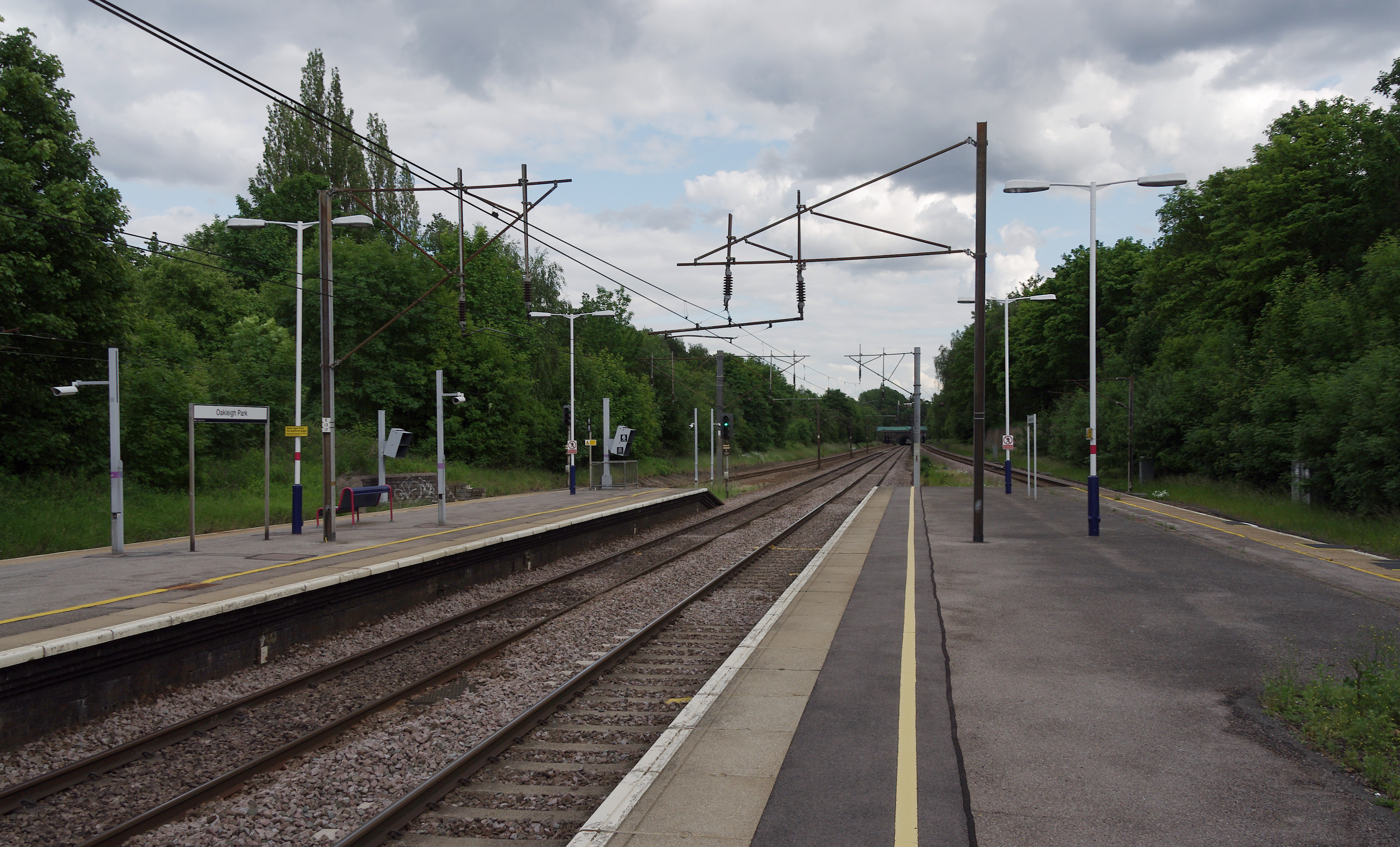
- Interactive map of Oakleigh Park

General information
- Location: Oakleigh Park
- Local authority: London Borough of Barnet
- Managed by: Great Northern
- Owner: Network Rail
- Station code: OKL
- DfT category: D
- Number of platforms: 4
- Fare zone: 4

National Rail annual entry and exit
- 2020–21: ▼0.199 million
- 2021–22: ▲0.500 million
- 2022–23: ▲0.734 million
- 2023–24: ▲0.814 million
- 2024–25: ▲0.924 million

Key dates
- 1866: Platforms constructed
- 1873: Station opened
- 1891/2: Station rebuilt

Other information
- External links: Departures; Facilities
- Coordinates: 51.6379°N 0.1667°W

Oakleigh Park railway station serves Oakleigh Park in the London Borough of Barnet, north London, England. It is 8 miles 30 chains (13.5 km) down the line from London King's Cross, in London fare zone 4. The station is managed and served by Great Northern.

Oyster pay as you go can now be used to and from this station as well as on the majority of National Rail services in Greater London. Customers should touch in and touch out at the validators provided to ensure they are charged the correct fare.

== History ==
In 1866 the Whetstone Park Company, promoters of the Whetstone Park Estate, reached an agreement with the Great Northern Railway (GNR) to construct a new station to serve the development. The station – to be known as Whetstone – would open once 25 houses were complete, although the GNR built the two station platforms immediately (they were completed by June 1866).

Contact between the developer and the GNR took place in January 1869, then again in summer 1871 by which time the development had been renamed to the Oakleigh Park Estate, but it was not until January 1873 that the developer was able to inform the GNR that the 25th house was complete. Accordingly, the GNR authorised the station to be completed, now to be known as Oakleigh Park. It opened to passenger traffic on 1 December 1873. The estate office was situated in Chandos Avenue; a contemporaneous sign advertising "Oakleigh Park on main line. Detached residences – gravel soil – open country – large plots – moderate prices" is displayed in the London Transport Museum in Covent Garden.

As part of works to increase the number of tracks from two to four, the station was completely rebuilt in 1891–2 with two island platforms, a new footbridge and booking office. The 1873 station footbridge at the extreme north end of the station was retained as a public footpath, but with the stairs to the station removed.

The station remained largely unchanged until around 1975, when alterations were made in readiness for electrification. By the 1930s the station had gained the suffix For East Barnet, which remained until at least the 1970s. The first holes were bored near the station for the overhead powerline in order to electrify the East Coast Main Line.

== Facilities ==
In Autumn 2008, a new SHERE self-service ticket machine, accepting both cash and credit cards, was installed here (and similarly at other local FCC stations). The station is made up of two island platforms, with platforms 1 and 2 serving southbound trains to Moorgate and King's Cross and platforms 3 and 4 serving northbound trains to Welwyn Garden City.

== Services ==
Off-peak, all services at Oakleigh Park are operated by Great Northern using Class 717 EMUs.

The typical off-peak service in trains per hour is:

- 2 tph to Moorgate
- 2 tph to Welwyn Garden City

Additional services, including a number of Thameslink operated services to and from Sevenoaks via Catford call at the station during the peak hours.

Preceding station	National Rail	Following station
New Southgate	Great Northern Great Northern Route Stopping Services	New Barnet
New Southgate	Thameslink Thameslink Peak Hours Only	New Barnet

== Connections ==
Transport for London bus route 383 stops directly outside Oakleigh Park railway station, as well as operating a Hail and Ride service along Netherlands Road and Oakleigh Park North/Athenaeum Road. Buses run towards Barnet, The Spires or towards Finchley Memorial Hospital, every 30 minutes Mondays to Saturdays except late evenings. London Bus route 184 stops nearby, but not at the station

== Nature reserve ==
Immediately to the south of the station is Oakleigh Park Rail Cutting, a Site of Local Importance for Nature Conservation.
