= St John's United Reformed Church, New Barnet =

Church in London Borough of Barnet, England

Coordinates: 51.6481°N 0.1782°W

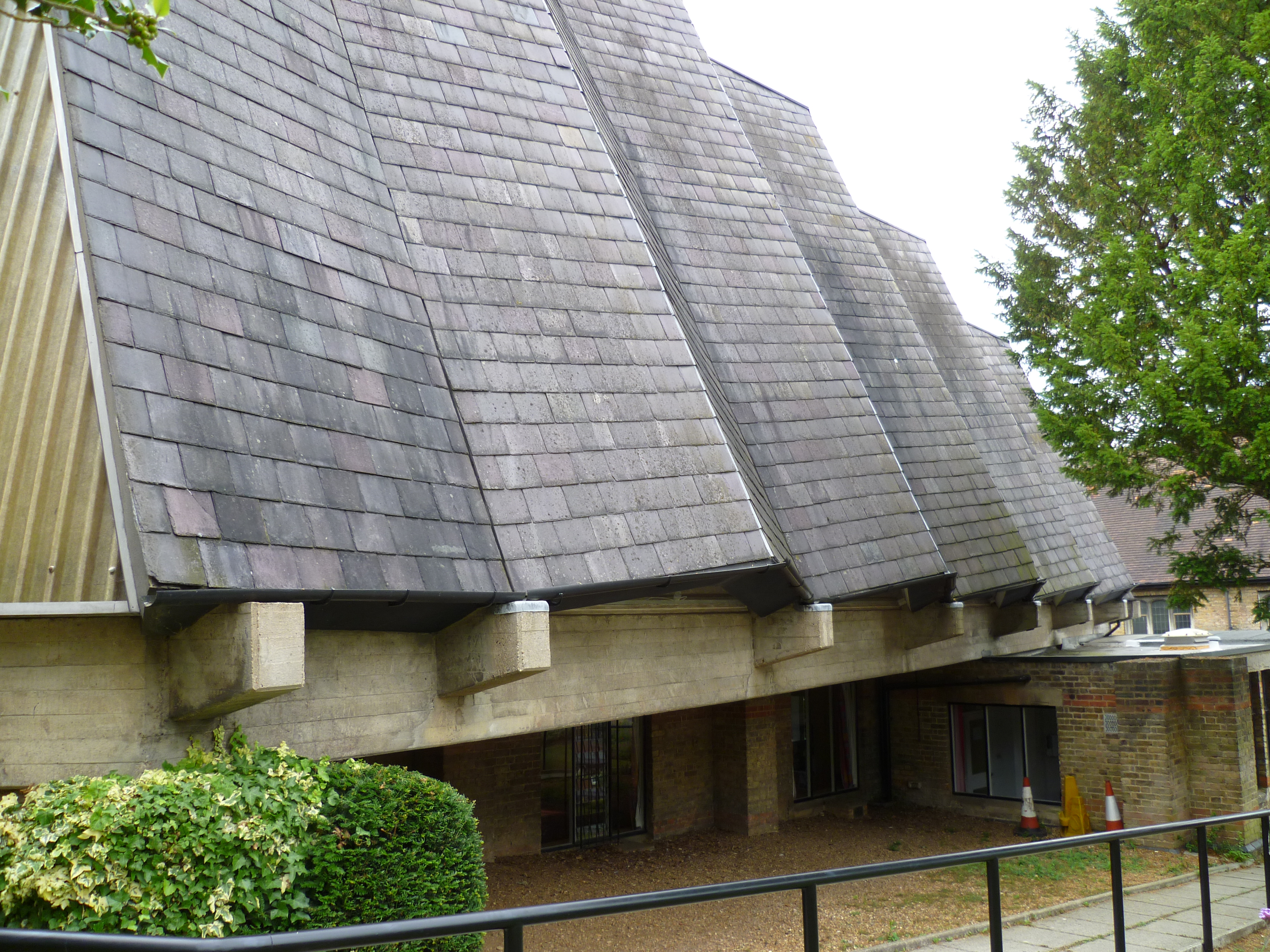
The distinctive roof design of St John's United Reformed Church

St John's United Reformed Church is a church in New Barnet, London. The church was formed by a union of St Augustine's Presbyterian Church and New Barnet Congregational Church in 1963.

The church has a distinctive modern design that was influenced by the membership of Jon Finlayson ARIBA. It won an award from the Civic Trust in 1970. The redevelopment of the site was funded partly from the sale of the old New Barnet Congregational Church site in nearby Station Road around 1967.
