= Barnet United Reformed Church =

Reformed Church in Chipping Barnet, London

Coordinates: 51.6462°N 0.2152°W

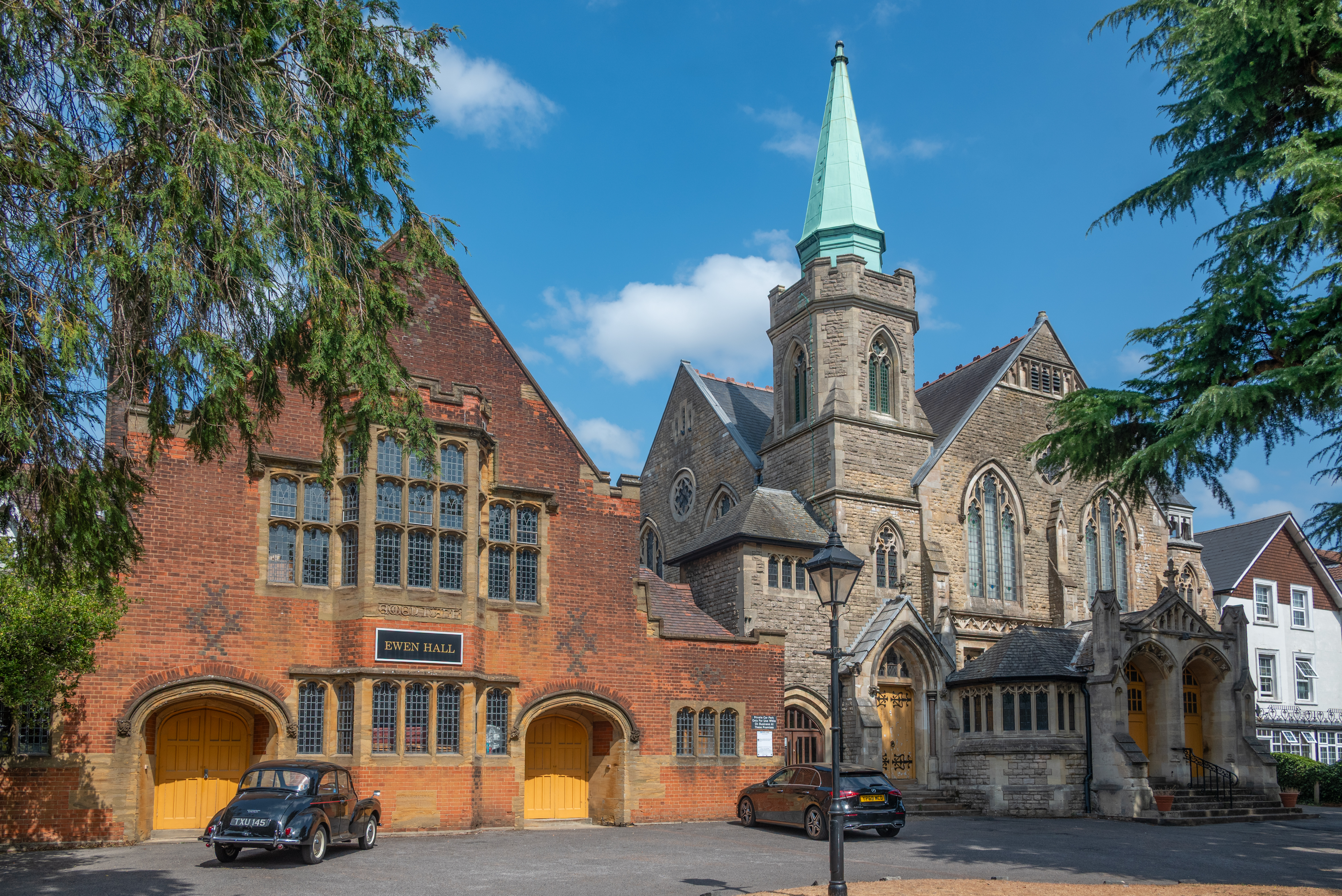
Barnet United Reformed Church and Ewen Hall adjacent

Barnet United Reformed Church is a church in Wood Street, Chipping Barnet, London.
