= Christ Church North Finchley =

Church in North Finchley, London, England

Coordinates: 51.6109°N 0.1749°W

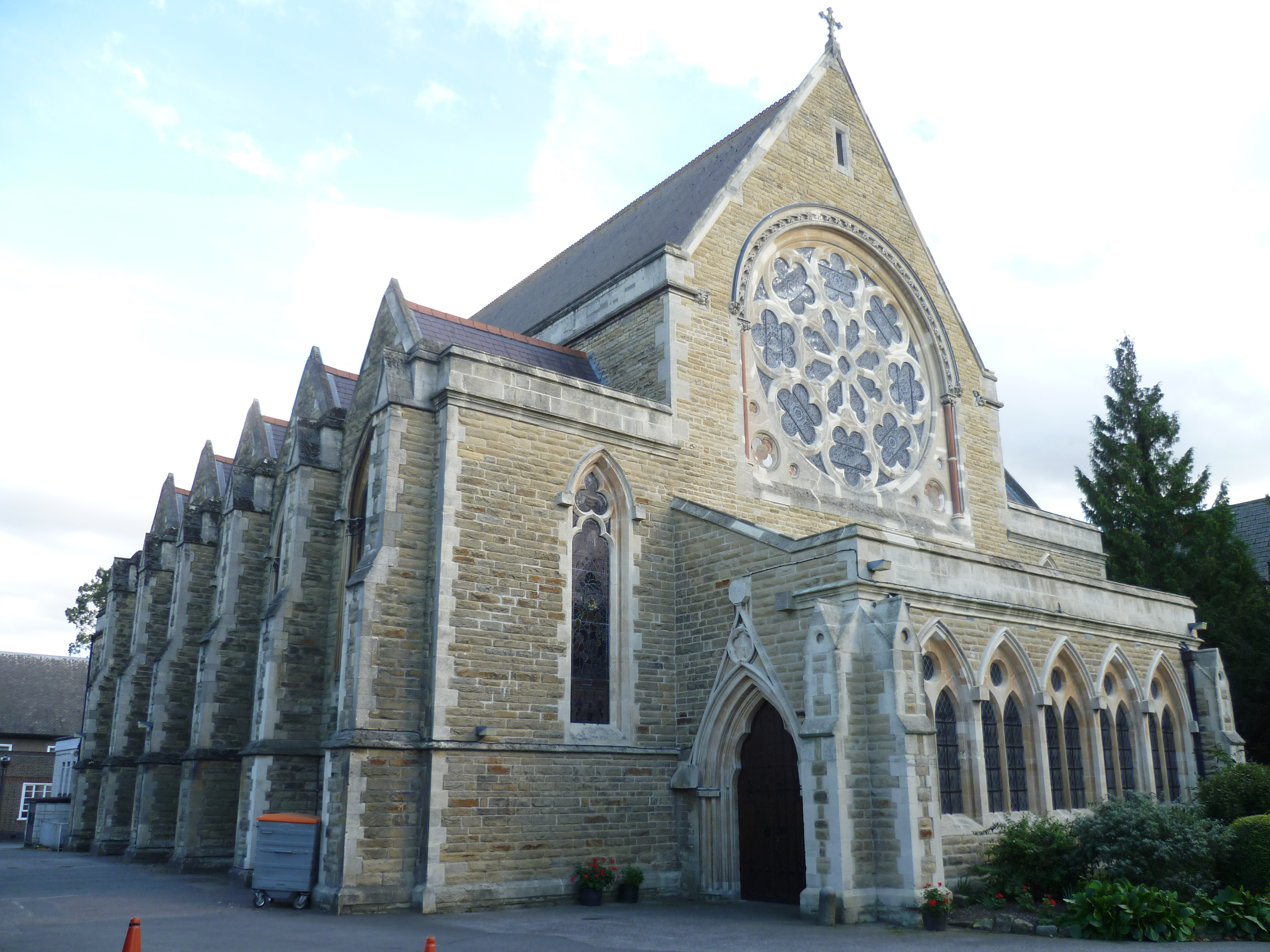
Christ Church North Finchley

Christ Church North Finchley is a Church of England evangelical church at 620 High Road, North Finchley, London. Christ Church is an evangelical Christian community.

== History ==
Henry Stephens, the first vicar of Christ Church, was born in Liverpool. He arrived in North Finchley in 1864 as a missionary to the local people, especially the many railwaymen, as the railway had recently arrived in the area. He spent a great deal of time preaching in the open air. Stephens oversaw the construction of the building, which began in 1867 and also founded Christ Church school (now Wren Academy) and nearby St Barnabas church. The memorial tablet on display in the church building summarises his passion: “Ever mindful of the spiritual welfare of his flock, he lived and preached Jesus Christ and Him crucified.”

Catherine Ironside was a Christ Church member who left her life in Finchley to serve as a missionary doctor in Esfahan, Iran. Following her death during the Asian Flu pandemic of 1922, the font cover was carved in her memory, echoing the famous Esfahan style.
