= Baptist Church, New Barnet =

Demolished church in New Barnet, London, England

Coordinates: 51.6498°N 0.1764°W

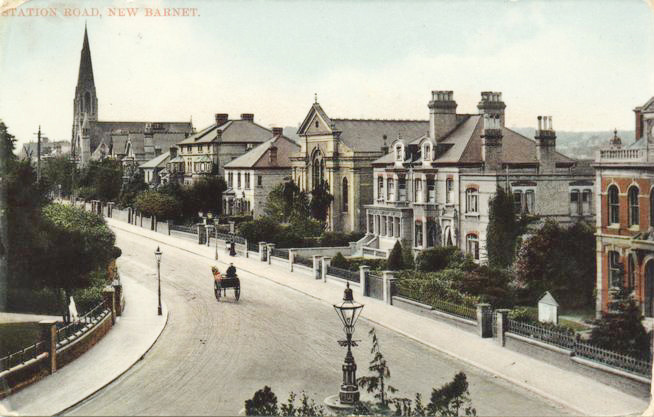
Station Road, New Barnet, in a c. 1900 postcard. Baptist Church in the centre, third from right, with pediment.

A Baptist Church once stood on the north side of Station Road, New Barnet. The church was designed by W. Allen Dixon and construction was underway by 21 May 1872, when a memorial stone was laid. The building was in a Renaissance style with elements of the Romanesque. It was built of gault and yellow stock brick with stone dressings. The front featured a three bay Palladian temple front. The church was a grade II listed building with English Heritage. It was demolished to make way for flats around 1982.

== See also ==
- New Barnet Congregational Church
