= St Joseph's Church, Newbury =

Church in Berkshire, England

St Joseph's Church
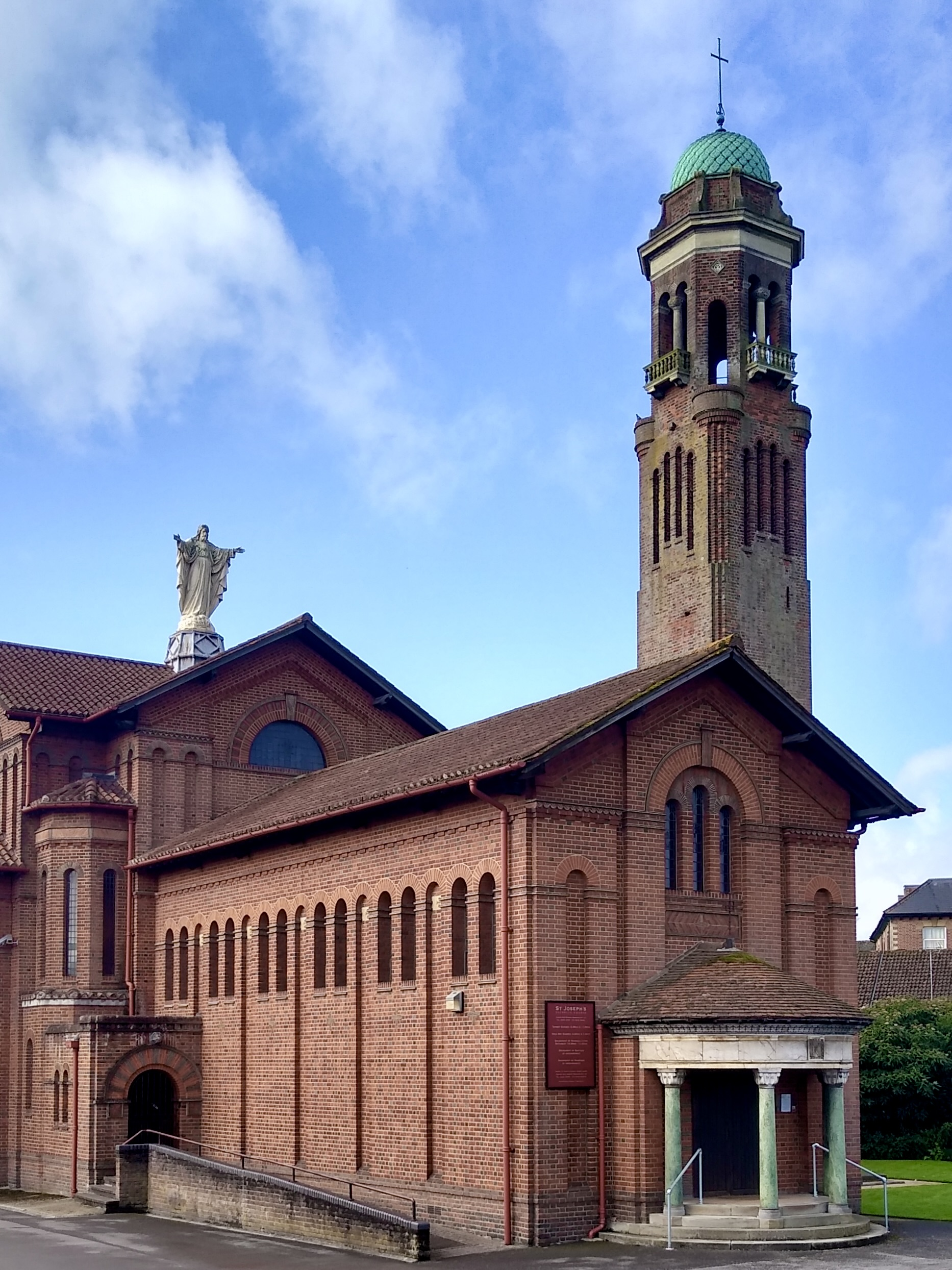
- St Joseph's Church
- 51.40647°N 1.31843°W
- OS grid reference: SU 47490 67699
- Location: Newbury
- Country: England
- Denomination: Roman Catholic
- Website: StJosephsNewbury.org.uk

History
- Status: Parish church
- Founded: 1864
- Dedication: Saint Joseph

Architecture
- Functional status: Active
- Heritage designation: Grade II listed
- Designated: 15 May 2023
- Architect: Wilfrid Clarence Mangan
- Style: Italianate
- Groundbreaking: 19 January 1926
- Completed: 21 November 1928
- Construction cost: £20,000

Administration
- Province: Southwark
- Diocese: Portsmouth
- Deanery: St Edmund Campion
- Parish: St Joseph

St Joseph's Church is a parish of the Roman Catholic Church in Newbury, Berkshire, England, part of the Roman Catholic Diocese of Portsmouth.

It is noted for its historic parish church, built from 1926 to 1928 in the Italianate style. It is located on the corner of London Road and Western Avenue north of the town centre. According to Historic England, which awarded it Grade II listed status in May 2023, the church is a "major local landmark".

== History ==
=== Foundation ===
In 1852, from St Mary's Church in Woolhampton, a Fr Robert Hodgson started a mission in Newbury. In 1853, he bought a house in Newbury, 105 London Road and the surrounding land for construction of a new church. The house became both a presbytery and a small school. In 1864, a small church was built next to the house, at a cost of £800.

=== Construction ===
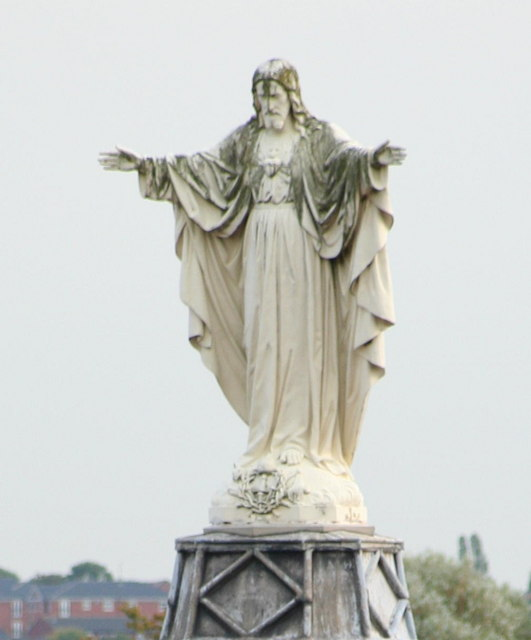
Statue atop the church

By the early twentieth century, the church was too small for the increasing local Catholic population. Funds were raised by the priest, Canon Francis Green. He went to Newbury Racecourse railway station when there were races at Newbury Racecourse to ask for money from people when they were leaving after the races. On 19 January 1926, the foundation stone was laid. The church was designed by Wilfred Clarence Mangan, an architect from Preston, who also designed the Church of Our Lady of Hal, Camden, English Martyrs Church, Reading, and the extension at St James's Church, Reading. The builders were the local firm Hoskings & Pond Ltd. On 21 November 1928, the church was opened. The total cost was around £20,000. The old church on London Road became the church hall. On 18 June 1978, a new altar in the church was consecrated by Anthony Emery, the Bishop of Portsmouth.

== Services ==
St. Joseph's offers daily Mass and two Sunday Masses, at 8:30am and 11:00am.

== See also ==
- Media related to St Joseph's Church, Newbury at Wikimedia Commons
