= New Barnet Congregational Church =

Church in London, England

Coordinates: 51.6493°N 0.1780°W

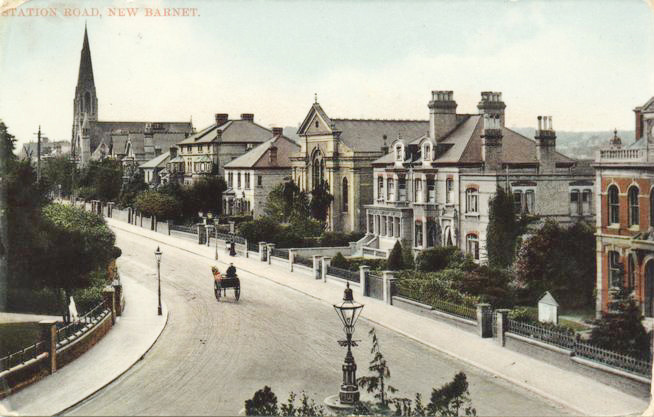
New Barnet Congregational Church (far left with spire) on a c. 1900 postcard of Station Road, New Barnet.

New Barnet Congregational Church is a church that once stood on the corner of Station Road and Plantagenet Road in New Barnet, London. The church was designed by John Sulman and opened in April 1880.

In 1963, it merged with the nearby St Augustine's Presbyterian Church in Mowbray Road. It closed on Easter Sunday of 1967, after which the site was sold and used for a housing development. The funds that were raised from the sale of the site contributed to the redevelopment of the St Augustine's Presbyterian Church site, which later became the St John's United Reformed Church.

== See also ==
- Baptist Church, New Barnet
