= Oakleigh Park =

Area in London, England

Coordinates: 51.6260°N 0.1716°W

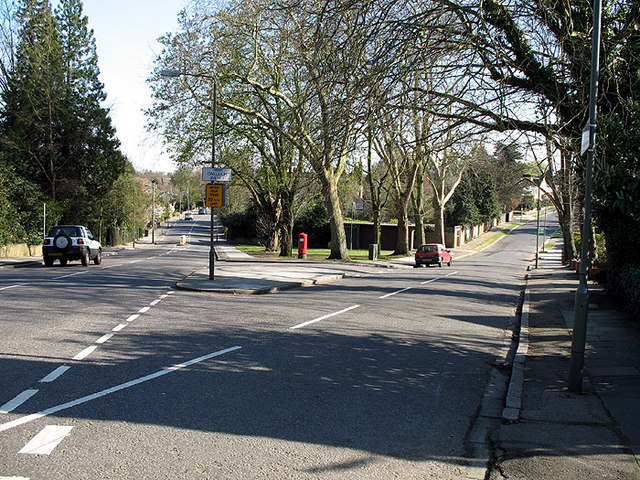
- The junction of Oakleigh Park South and Oakleigh Avenue

- Location within Greater London
- OS grid reference: TQ265935
- London borough: Barnet
- Ceremonial county: Greater London
- Region: London
- Country: England
- Sovereign state: United Kingdom
- Post town: LONDON
- Postcode district: N20
- Post town: BARNET
- Postcode district: EN5
- Dialling code: 020
- Police: Metropolitan
- Fire: London
- Ambulance: London
- UK Parliament: Chipping Barnet
- London Assembly: Barnet and Camden

Oakleigh Park is a loosely defined district in the north of the London Borough of Barnet. It adjoins Whetstone, and is often regarded as part of either that district or of East Barnet, although the East Coast Main Line forms a border with the latter. The name is a relatively modern invention, derived from the eponymous Oakleigh Park railway station which opened in 1873. Since 2002, 'Oakleigh' has also been the name of the electoral ward for the area, formed from parts of the abolished Hadley and Friern Barnet wards.

The principal road is Oakleigh Road North, from which Oakleigh Park North, Oakleigh Avenue and Oakleigh Park South turn off. There is a small shopping parade on Netherlands Road just to the north of the railway station.

== Education ==
Primary schools in Oakleigh Park include:

- All Saints
- Sacred Heart

== Transport ==
=== Bus ===
Transport for London bus route 383 stops directly outside Oakleigh Park railway station and operates a Hail and Ride service along Netherlands Road and Oakleigh Park North/Athenaeum Road. Buses run every 30 minutes, Mondays to Saturdays except late evenings, towards either Barnet (the Spires) or Woodside Park tube station. There is currently no service on this route on Sundays or public holidays.

=== Railway station ===
- Oakleigh Park railway station - Great Northern

=== Tube station ===
Nearby:

- Totteridge and Whetstone tube station - Northern line

== Notable people ==
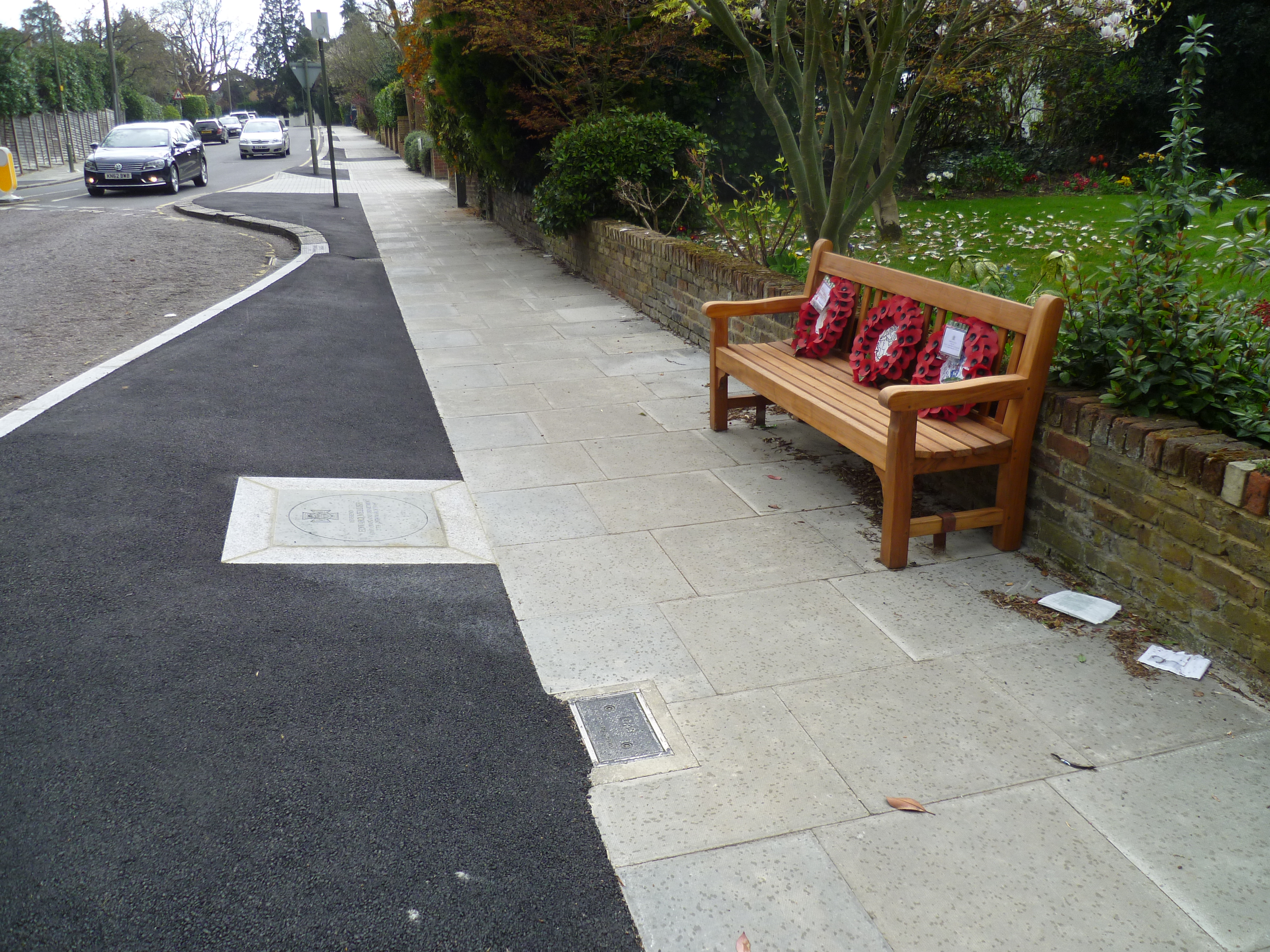
The plaque to the memory of Noel Mellish VC in Oakleigh Park North with the associated bench and wreaths, April 2016.

Noel Mellish, a British Army chaplain and recipient of the Victoria Cross for rescuing wounded men during the First World War, was born at Trenabie House, in Oakleigh Park North, in 1880. The house no longer exists, but in March 2016 a plaque was installed nearby in a ceremony attended by Mellish's daughter Claire.

John Betjeman visited the area while working at nearby Heddon Court and references "Oakley" Park and Rosslyn Avenue in his poem "The Outer Suburbs".
