= Station Road, New Barnet =

Road in New Barnet, London

Coordinates: 51°38′58.14″N 0°10′35.55″W

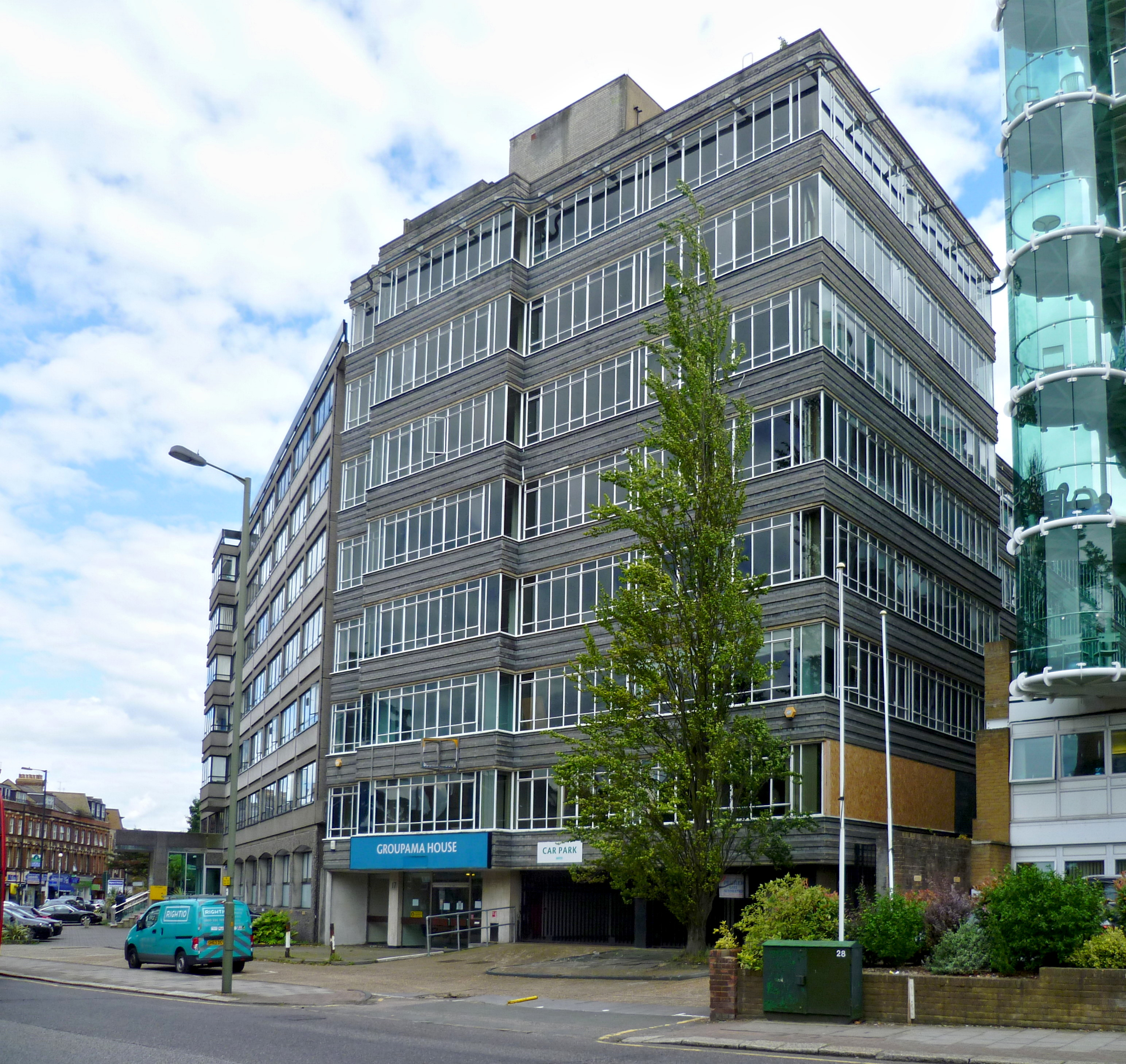
Groupama House on Station Road

Station Road is a road in New Barnet, northern Greater London, that runs from Station Approach and East Barnet Road in the east to the Great North Road and Barnet Hill in the west. It is joined on its northern side by Warwick Road and Plantagenet Road. On the south side it is joined by Gloucester Road, Mowbray Road, and Lyonsdown Road.

== History ==
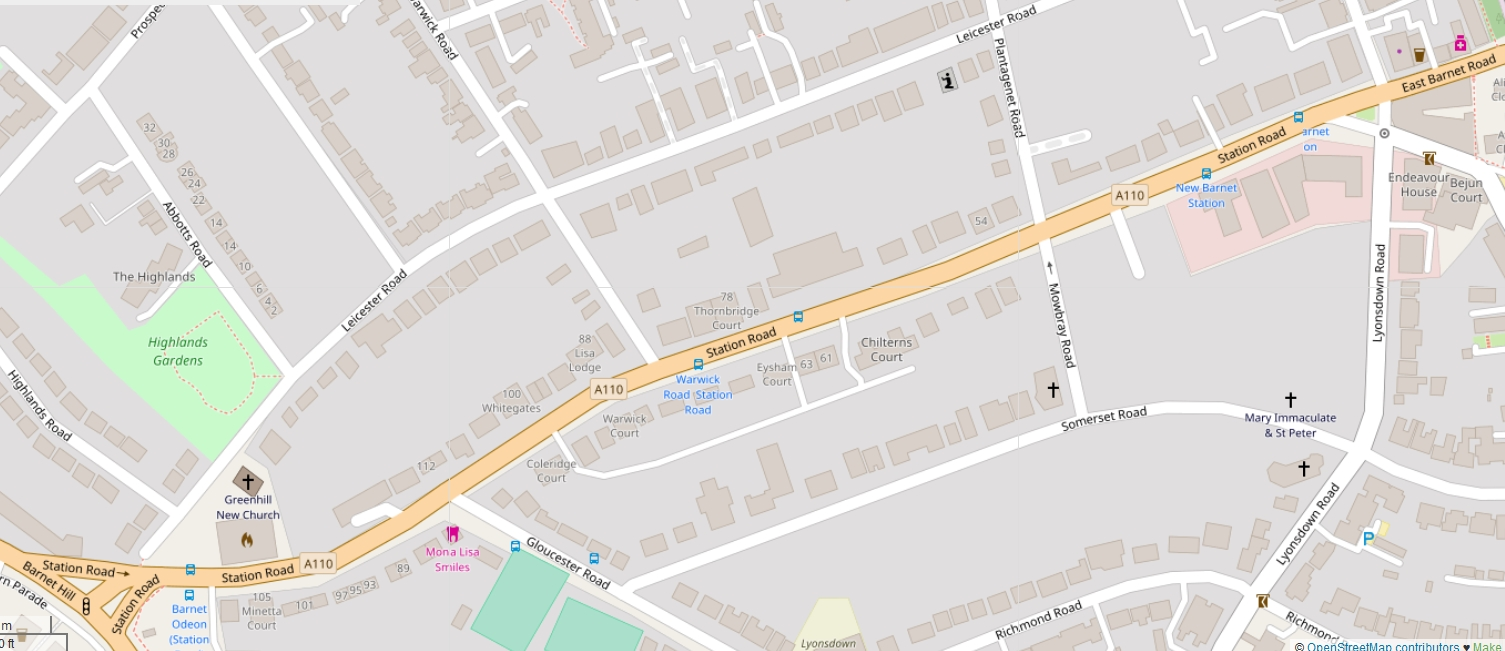
Station Road, New Barnet map.

The road was originally named New Barnet Road with only the very easternmost end near New Barnet railway station known as Station Road. By the late nineteenth century, however, the entire road was known as Station Road.

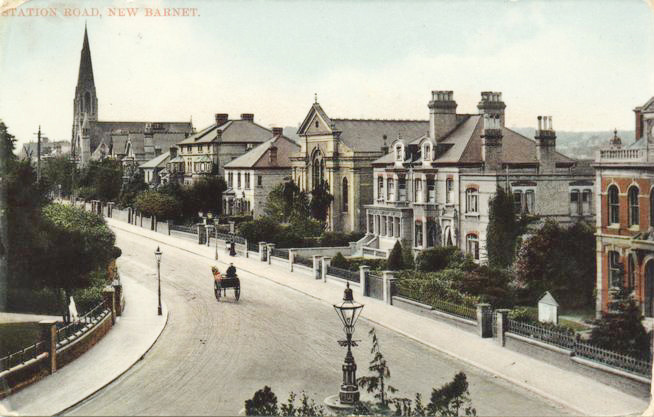
Station Road c.1900, view from the western end. New Barnet Congregational Church at the far end, pediment of the Baptist Church mid way and the town hall nearest the camera.

Three large non-conformist churches were built in Station Road between 1872 and 1880, Baptist, Congregationalist, and Methodist, all of which were demolished between 1963 and 1982.

The road is a mix of semi-detached and detached houses in the west, small apartment blocks, and large office buildings in the east near the station that are characteristic, according to Pevsner and Cherry, of the fashion in the 1960s for out-of-town offices near transport hubs. Most of those blocks have been converted to flats in whole or part since 2000, including Basil Court, Endeavour House, Kingmaker House, Groupama House, Comer House, and Castle House.

== Notable buildings ==
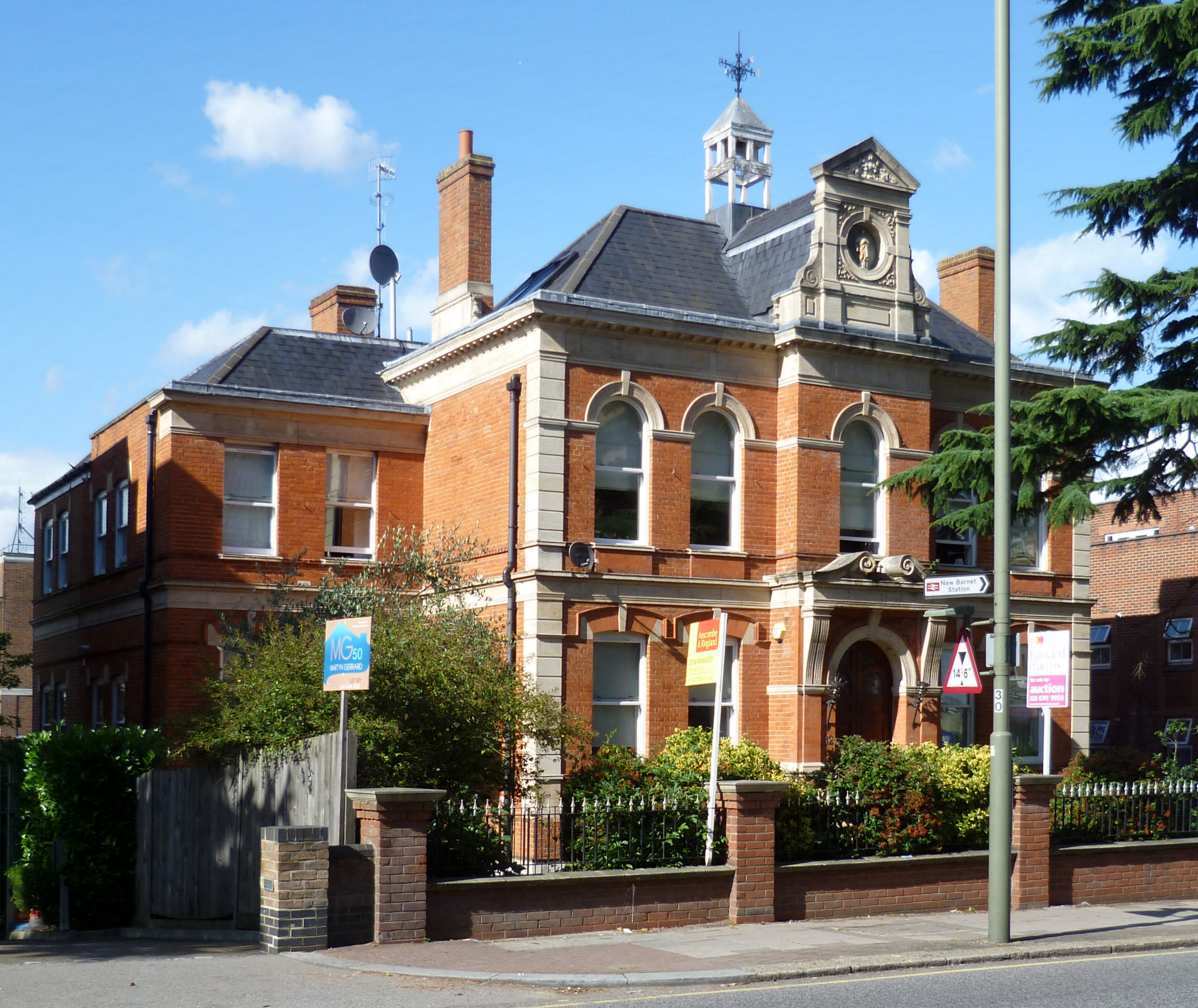
Former East Barnet Urban District town hall

- Baptist Church, New Barnet (1872-1982)
- New Barnet Congregational Church (1880-c.1967)
- New Barnet Methodist Chapel (1880-1963)
- East Barnet Town Hall (built 1891–92) Built in an Italianate style to a design by Frederick William Shenton following an open competition. Now flats.
- New Barnet War Memorial, designed by Newbury Abbot Trent (1921), is located on a triangular site at the eastern end of the road.
- Barnet Fire Station (1993)
- Comer House (c.2000), upper floors converted from offices to flats.
