= Lytton Road Assembly Rooms =

Coordinates: 51.650384°N 0.175444°W

The Regal, New Barnet

The Lytton Road Assembly Rooms were built by E. Fergusson Taylor in New Barnet around 1870.

Film pioneer Birt Acres gave a display of moving pictures to the Lyonsdown Photographic Society there on 10 January 1896.

The building became a cinema in 1925 and was replaced with a purpose built building in 1926 known as The Hippodrome, the New Barnet Kinema, the New Barnet Picture Theatre, and The Regal from 1933. It later became a Mecca bingo hall, a snooker club, and finally a Quazer laser war games centre. It was demolished in 1999 and the flats known as Clivedon Court were built on the site.
