= Barnet Vale =

Coordinates: 51.6482°N 0.1821°W

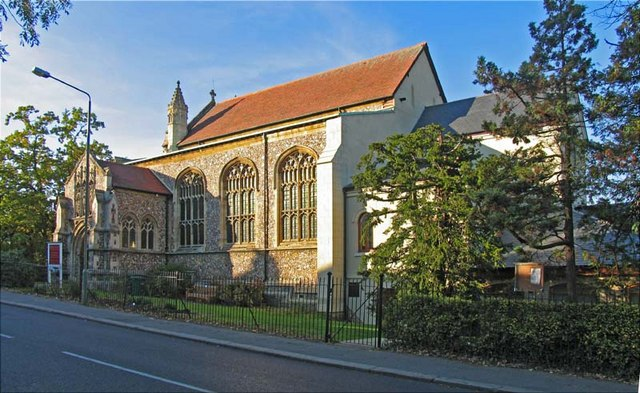

- Location within Greater London
- London borough: Barnet
- Ceremonial county: Greater London
- Region: London
- Country: England
- Sovereign state: United Kingdom
- Police: Metropolitan
- Fire: London
- Ambulance: London
- London Assembly: Barnet and Camden

Barnet Vale is a residential district in the London Borough of Barnet. It was also a civil parish.

The name shares its origin with nearby Chipping Barnet, East Barnet and Friern Barnet. 'Barnet' means the land cleared by burning.

The civil parish was created on 31 December 1894 from part of the ancient parish of Chipping Barnet. It was an urban parish, used for the election of poor law guardians. The first election of a guardian took place on 19 December 1894 and returned a Conservative candidate. For local government, it was part of the East Barnet Valley Urban District. On 1 April 1965 the parish was abolished. At the 1951 census (one of the last before the abolition of the parish), Barnet Vale had a population of 4675.

St Mark's Church, Barnet Vale is located there. For elections to Barnet Council, it is part of the Barnet Vale ward.

The population was as follows:

| Year | 1891 | 1901 | 1911 | 1921 | 1931 | 1941 | 1951 |
|---|---|---|---|---|---|---|---|
| Population | 1,112 (Note: Equivalent area) | 1,814 | 2,017 | 2,110 | (Note: The census was suspended for World War II.) | 2,881 | 4,675 |
