= Cyril Catford =

British army officer in the Durham Light Infantry

- Born: September, 1890; New Barnet, England
- Died: 5 October 1916 (aged 26); The Somme, France
- Spouse: Rosalind Ruth Catford
- Military career
- Allegiance: United Kingdom
- Branch: British Army
- Service years: 1914–1916
- Rank: Lieutenant
- Unit: Durham Light Infantry

Lieutenant Cyril Herbert Barclay Catford (September 1890 – 5 October 1916) was a British army officer in the Durham Light Infantry. He died at Battle of the Somme. His final letters are preserved at the Durham County Record Office.

== Early life ==
Cyril Catford was born in New Barnet to Mr and Mrs Herbert Catford. He married Rosalind Ruth Jarmand in 1915 and they lived in Steeple Morden, Royston, Hertfordshire. Their son, Captain Herbert Ellis Cyril Barclay Catford, later served in the Durham Light Infantry in the Second World War.

== First World War ==
Catford was commissioned as a Lieutenant into the 6th Battalion, Durham Light Infantry. While serving on the Western Front, he wrote for The Whizz-Bang, a monthly magazine written and edited by British soldiers in the trenches.

In September 1916, Catford's company took part in the Battle of the Somme. As of 25 September, they had been able to capture positions without significant fighting and had suffered only 15 casualties.

There is very little to say about this big show except the Artillery is awful and the flies are worse, whilst conditions of living are worse still. All the same we are exceptionally cheerful. We bear everything I hope like good soldiers proud to have beaten thoroughly the reputed "Invincible German Army". The men are absolutely wonderful. My Company are in the best of spirits I think you might send out 1000 Woodbines for them.

Well I think I have given you some idea of what it is like out here. Men live and die like heroes and face with the greatest of courage that which no men ought to be called upon to face, I can say no more.

— Lt. Catford, 25 September 1916.

Over the following five days, in advance of the next push, a number of Catford's men and fellow officers were killed or left with shell shock.

I am writing to tell you that I am keeping well and am feeling very much better to-day. I have only one Officer left in my Company. One left last night with shell-shock. I do not wonder at it seeing what we have to put up with. I expect to be on leave in a months time and am looking forward to seeing you all----

To-morrow we go into our final big attack. Do not worry if you don't hear for a day or two from me, I shall not have very much opportunity of writing to you for a bit.

— Lt. Catford, 30 September 1916.

Catford was injured in the following attack and subsequently died of his wounds on 5 October.

== Memorial ==
In addition to his Commonwealth war grave at Dernancourt, a statue by Nathaniel Hitch was erected in his memory at St Mark's Church, Barnet Vale.

His final letters are preserved by the Durham County Record Office and are sometimes read at British Remembrance Day services.
