= Holy Trinity Lyonsdown =

Church in New Barnet, London

Coordinates: 51.6476°N 0.1758°W

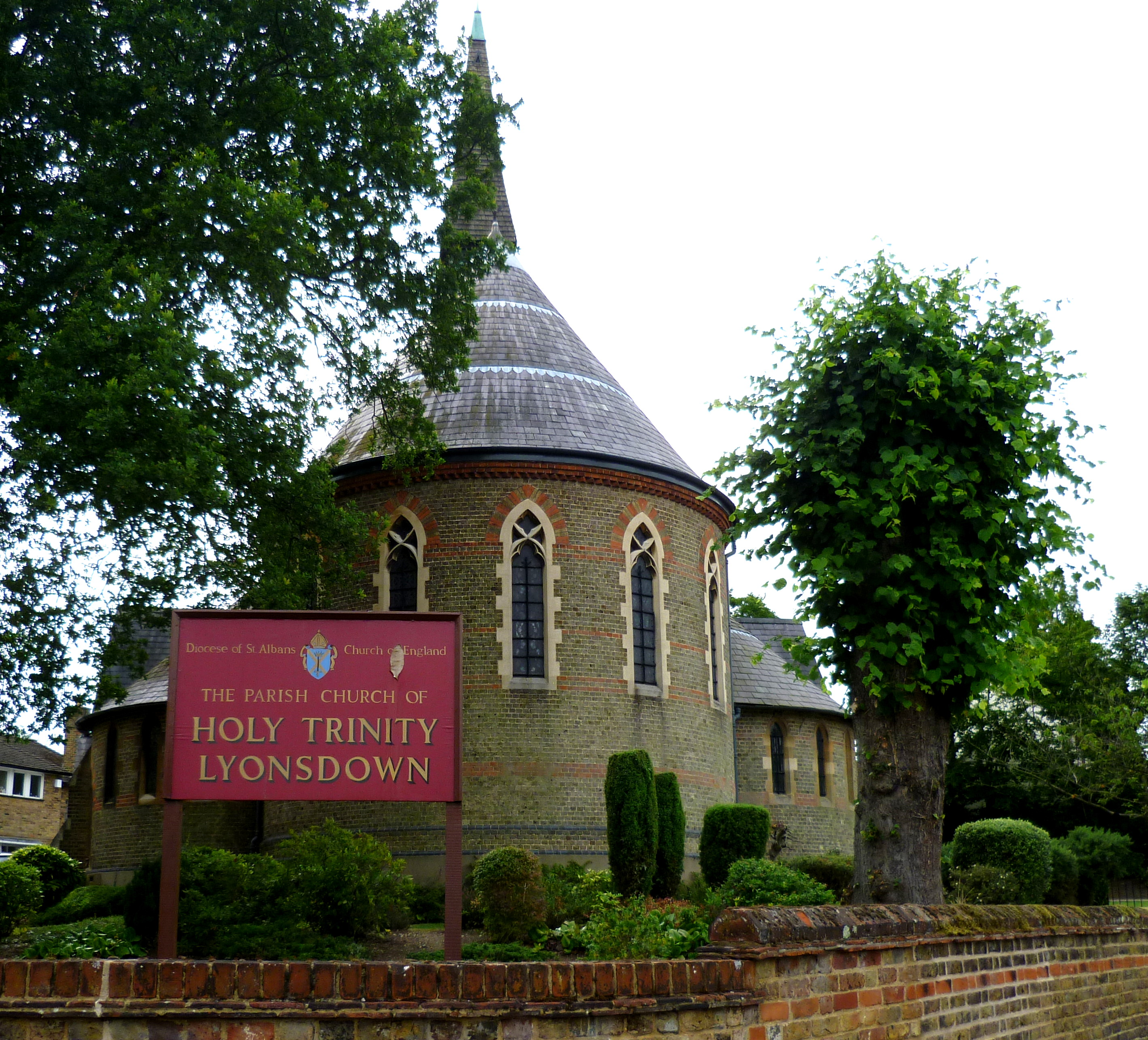
Holy Trinity Lyonsdown

Holy Trinity Lyonsdown is a Church of England parish church in New Barnet, London. The church was built in 1866.

The first incumbent was William Gibbs Barker. From 1896 until about 1901 the parish organist was W.R. Driffill.
