= Barnet Fire Station =

Fire station in London, United Kingdom

Coordinates: 51.64719°N 0.18597°W

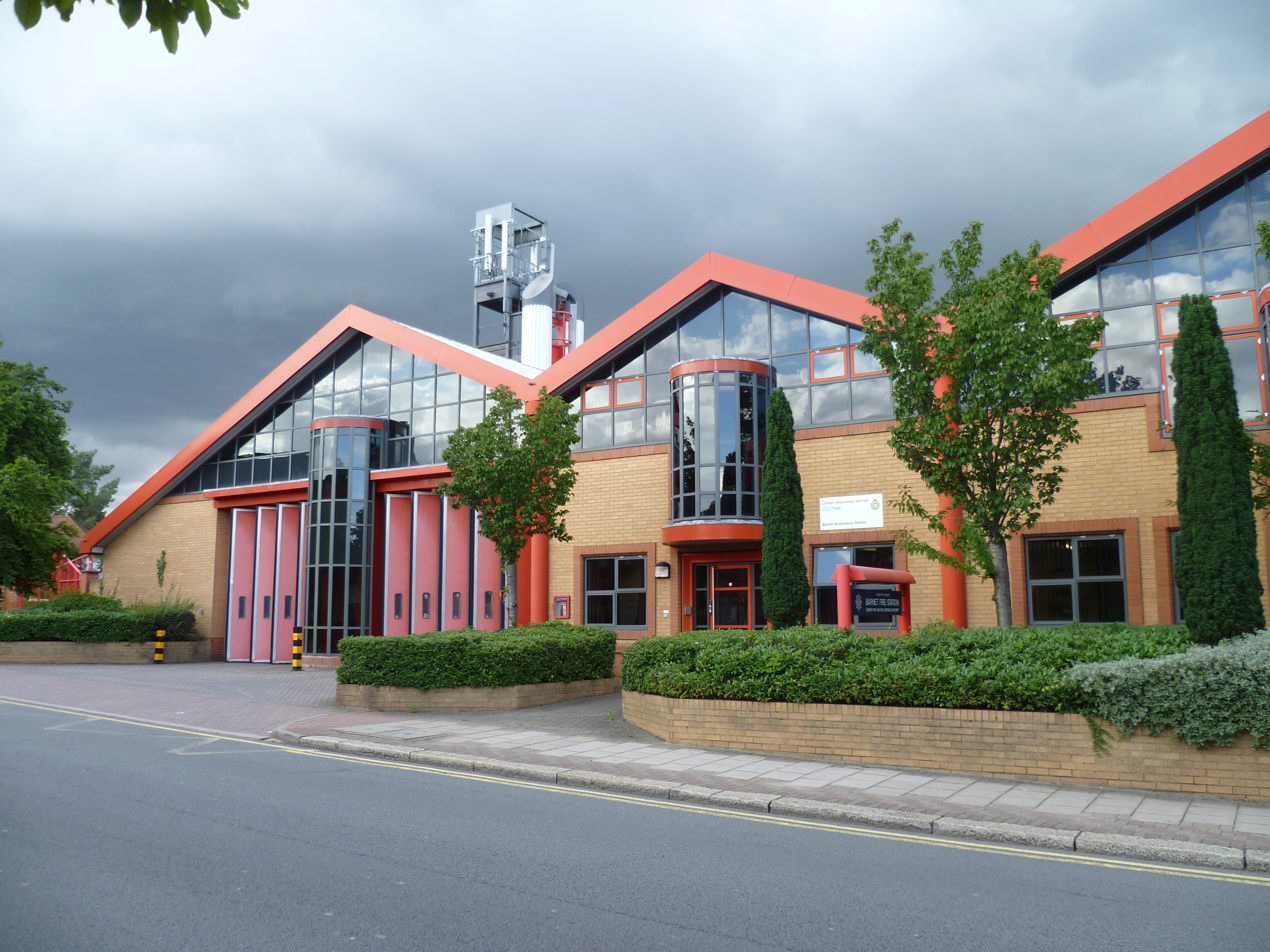
Barnet Fire Station

Barnet Fire Station is located in Station Road, New Barnet, London. It was opened in 1993. A previous station in nearby Leicester Road closed in 1992 and was demolished in 2005.
