= William Ralph Driffill =

English organist and composer

William Ralph Driffill (8 December 1870 in Dunstable – 24 April 1922 in Barnet) was an English organist and composer.

== Personal life ==
Driffill was the son of William Driffill, a plumber who ran his own business in Dunstable, and Maria (née Potter). In 1908 he married Kate Prior (1879–1947). Their first child was Helen Elsbeth (1914–96). Their second child was Kathleen Rosemary (1922–2008); she was born 6 months after her father's sudden death from pneumonia in 1922. W.R. Driffil's papers and manuscripts remain with his descendants. When giving recitals or directing concerts he was often assisted by his cousin Frederick Gostelow (1866–1942).

== Student days ==
In 1890, Driffill enrolled at the Royal Academy of Music. During his time there he gained prizes for his playing and composition. In 1891, he is recorded as gaining the status of 'Certificated Pianist' of Trinity College of Music in their '35th Half-Yearly Higher Examinations'.

== Performing ==
=== Conductor ===
- 1900: Barnet: Mr. W. R. Driffill's Choral Society gave a highly satisfactory performance, on the 8th ult., of Franco Leoni's "Gate of Life," preceded by Mendelssohn's "Hymn of Praise" [...] The singing of the choir gave evidence of careful and efficient training, which reflected great credit on the conductor, Mr. Driffill.

=== Organist ===
- n.d.: organist at St. Mary the Virgin, in Monken Hadley, Hertfordshire.
- 1896–? : organist of Holy Trinity, Lyonsdown, New Barnet.
- 1901–? : organist of St. Mark's, Barnet Vale.

== Works ==
=== Choral ===
- 1891: Magnificat and Nunc Dimittis in F. (London and New York : Novello, Ewer and Co).
- 1895: There's a Friend for little Children. Anthem. Op. 7. (London : Weekes & Co.).
- 1898: Magnificat and Nunc dimittis in D. Op. 10. (London : Weekes & Co.).
- 1903: Magnificat and Nunc dimittis in E. (London : Vincent Music Co.).
- 1913: Magnificat and Nunc dimittis in A. (London : Weekes & Co.).
- 1914: Te Deum laudamus in D. (London : Weekes & Co.).

=== Organ ===
- 1892.: Minuet in D (n.p.).
- 1893: Postlude in D (London, Leipzig : ?).
- 1894: Minuet in A. Op. 6. (London : Mathias & Strickland).
- 1896: Two Organ Works. Op. 9. 1. Postlude. 2. Reverie. (London : Weekes & Co.)
- 1899: Nocturne No. 3. In The Organ Loft : a magazine of organ music suitable for church & recital purposes. Book XXVI (London : The Vincent Music Co).
- 1905: Suite in F minor. Op. 14. Allegro Maestoso, Romance, Toccata. (London : The Vincent Music Co).
- 1909: Cantaline in A minor, in The Organ Loft : a magazine of organ music suitable for church & recital purposes. Book LVIII. (London : The Vincent Music Co.).
- 1910: Minuet in C. (n.p.).
- 1911: Second Suite. Allegro con spirito, Berceuse, Allegro vivace. (London : The Vincent Music Co).
- 1912: Intermezzo, in The Organ Loft : a magazine of organ music suitable for church & recital purposes. Book LXXXVI. (London : The Vincent Music Co.).
- 1914: Andantino. (London : Novello).
- 1917: Andantino in 5-4 time. (London : Augener)

=== Piano ===
- 1893: Three sonatinas for the piano. Op. 4. (London : E. Donajowski).
- 1896: Three Sonatinas for the Pianoforte, in A major, in B flat major, in D major. Op. 8. (London : Weekes & Co.).
- 1903: Tarantella in F minor. (London : E. Ashdown).
- 1909: Elfin Dance. (London : Vincent Music Co).
- 1910: Suite in E. The Hours. For Piano. 1. Dawn. 2. Noon. 3. Evening. 4. Night. (London : E. Howard).
- 1912: The Land of Dreams. Idyll. (London : J. R. Lafleur & Son).
- 1913: School-Day Miniatures. (London : Weekes & Co.).
- 1915: Valse Caprice. (London : A. Lengnick & Co.).
- 1917: Elfin Dance. (London : Winthrop Rogers).

=== Solo voice ===
- 1913: Here's to Jack. Song, words by L. Melville. (London : Bach & Co,).
- 1917: The Old Homeland. Song. Words by Aubrey Jacques. (London : West & Co).
- 1919: Longing for you. Song. Words by Aubrey Jacques. (n.p.)/
