= East Barnet =

Area of north London, England

Coordinates: 51.643°N 0.163°W

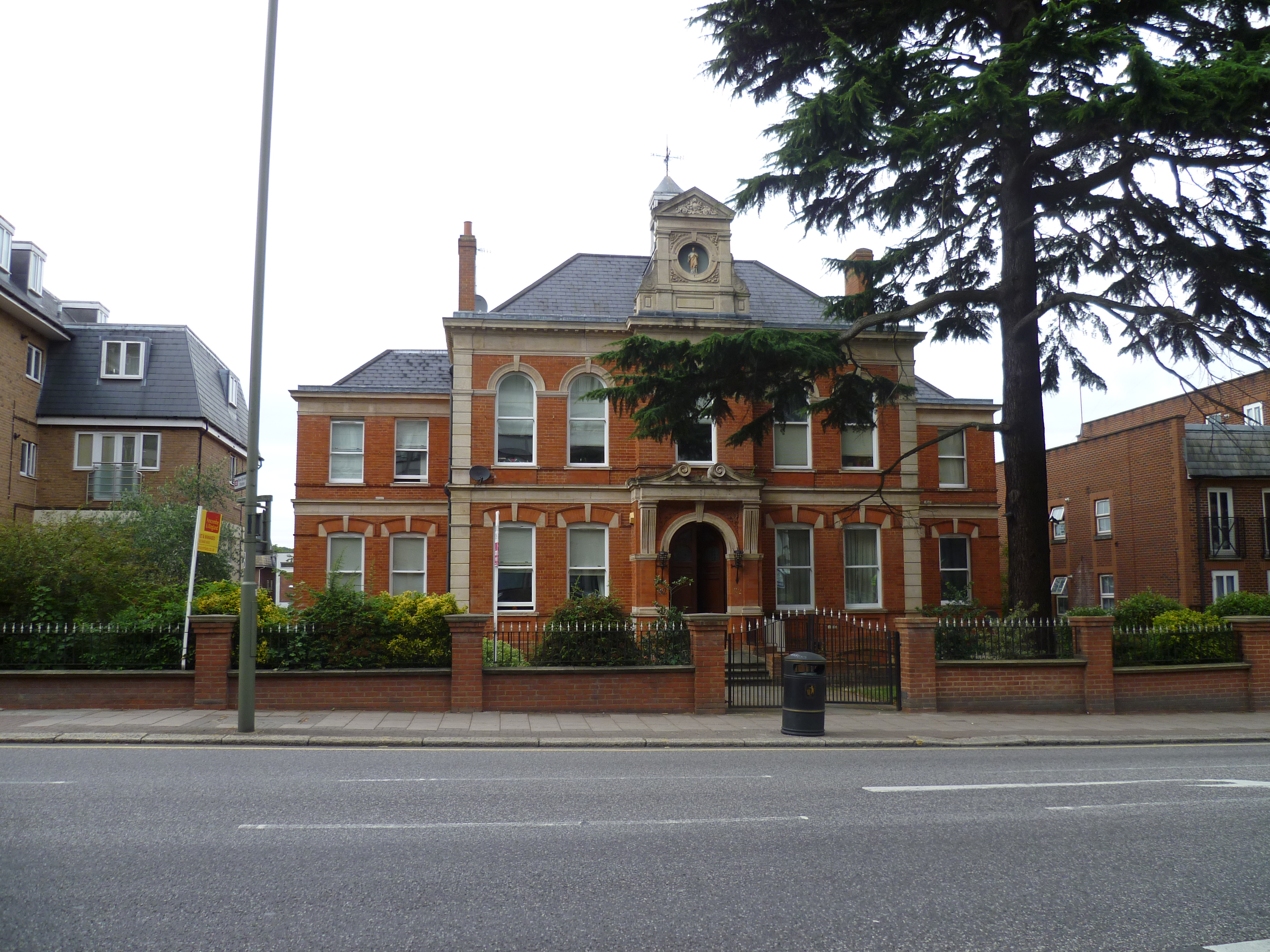
- The former East Barnet Town Hall

- Location within Greater London
- Population: 16,137 (2011 Census. Ward)
- OS grid reference: TQ271954
- London borough: Barnet
- Ceremonial county: Greater London
- Region: London
- Country: England
- Sovereign state: United Kingdom
- Post town: BARNET
- Postcode district: EN4
- Dialling code: 020
- Police: Metropolitan
- Fire: London
- Ambulance: London
- UK Parliament: Chipping Barnet
- London Assembly: Barnet and Camden

A map of East Barnet Valley Urban District in 1894

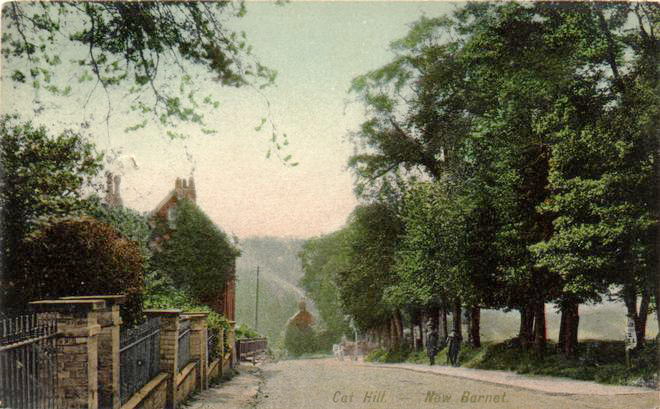
Cat Hill

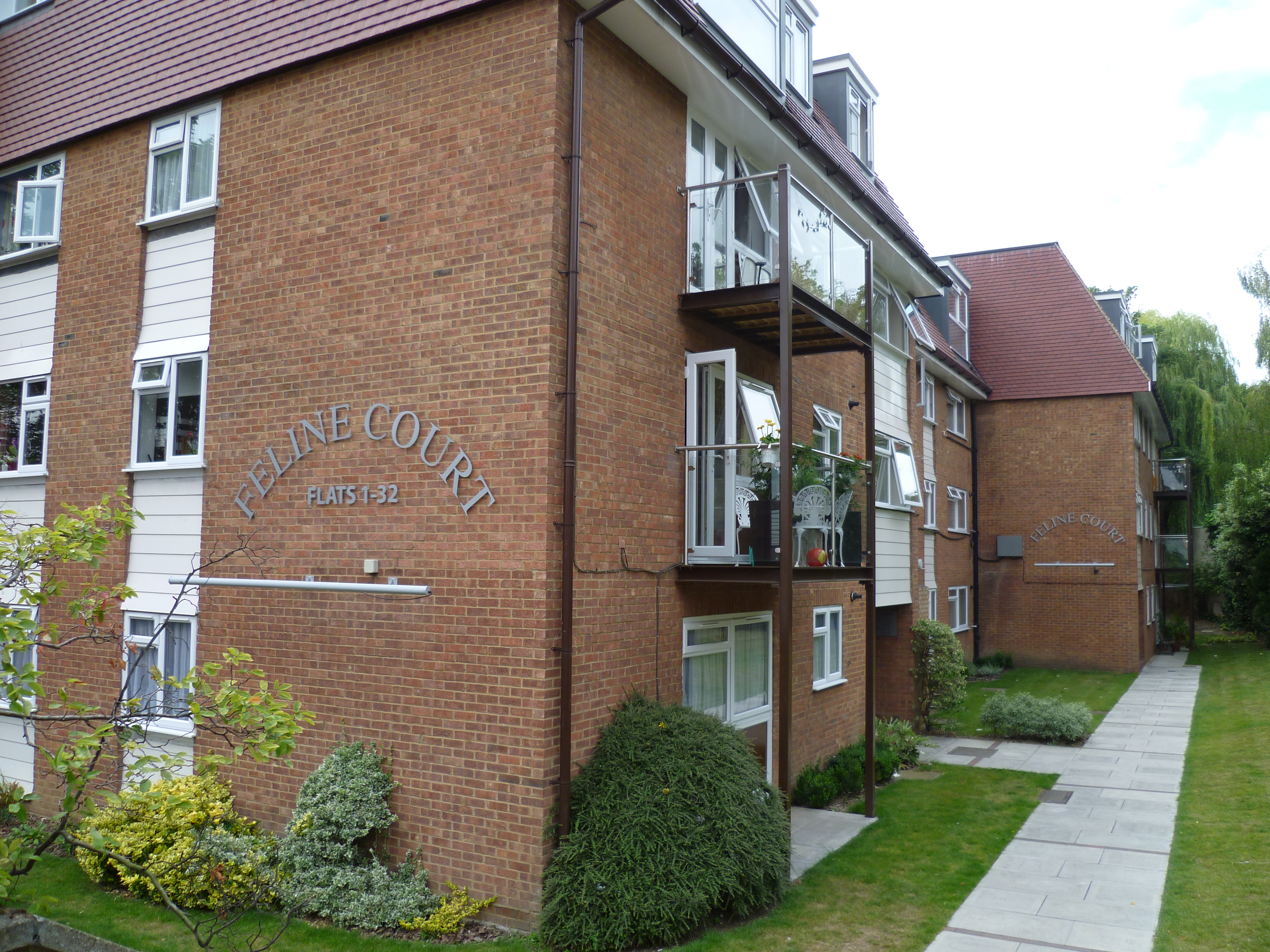
Feline Court, Cat Hill

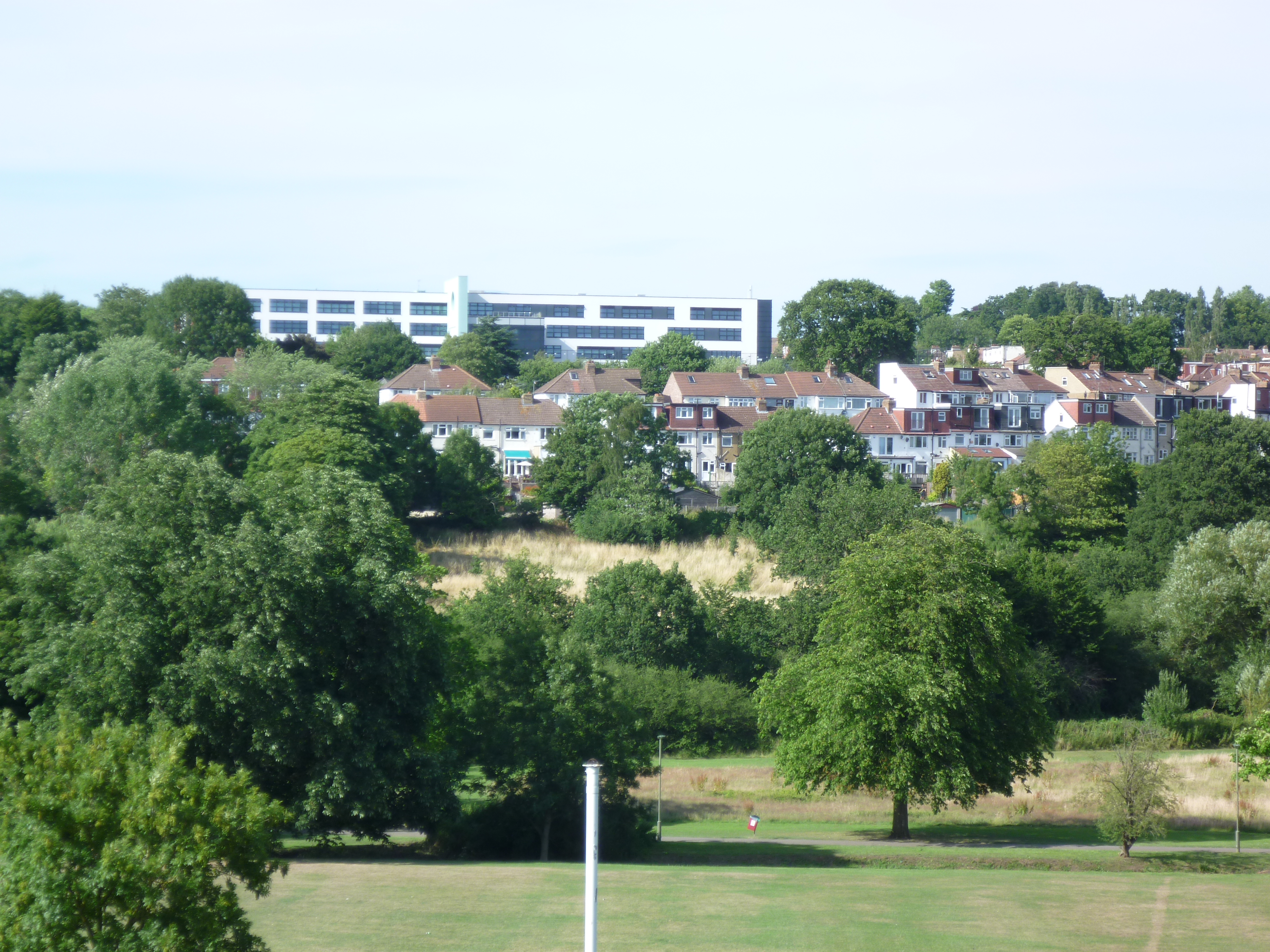
East Barnet School from Oak Hill Park

East Barnet is an area of north London within the London Borough of Barnet bordered by New Barnet, Cockfosters and Southgate. It is 10 miles (16 km) north of Charing Cross. It is a largely residential suburb whose central area contains shops, public houses, restaurants and services, and the parish church of St Mary the Virgin. East Barnet is close to the M25 and the A1 and M1.

== History ==
From 1894 until 1965 East Barnet formed part of the East Barnet Urban District of Hertfordshire. In 1965, it was transferred from Hertfordshire to Greater London; the area was amalgamated with Barnet and Friern Barnet Urban Districts, Finchley and Hendon Municipal Boroughs to form the London Borough of Barnet.

== Governance ==
Barnet local elections are held every four years to elect councillors. East Barnet is covered by two wards:

- East Barnet ward – East of the railway line and north of Parkside Gardens / Stuart Road.
- Brunswick Park ward – East of the railway line and south of Parkside Gardens / Stuart Road.

Note: St Mary the Virgin – the Parish Church of East Barnet – is actually in Brunswick Park ward. Brunswick Park ward contains the districts of Brunswick Park and Osidge.

== Demographics ==
East Barnet has its own electoral ward. The 2011 census of East Barnet ward counted a population of 16,137. The ethnic makeup was 76.6% White (61.3% British, 12.8% Other, 2.6% Irish), 10.6% Asian (largest being Indian, 4.4%), and 5.1% Black (largest being African, 3.2%). 54% of the population were Christian, with the combined share of Hindus, Jews and Muslims being 15%. Of the 6,531 households, most (4,266) were a whole house or bungalow, and the majority of those were semi-detached properties. Almost 68% of home tenures were owned, with a minority privately rented and a smaller minority that are socially rented. 4.6% of economically active people were unemployed. The median age was 38.

=== Population ===
East Barnet (parish) population
1881	3,992
1891	5,128
1901	6,839
1911	8,763
1921	9,747
1931	14,146
1941	*
1951	31,672
1961	40,641
*No census held due to war.
source: UK census

== Transport ==
Buses

- 125 – Winchmore Hill (Station Road) to Finchley Central
- 184 – Barnet (Chesterfield Road) to Turnpike Lane bus/tube station
- 307 – Barnet (Barnet General Hospital) to Brimsdown railway station
- 326 – Barnet (the Spires) to Brent Cross Shopping Centre
- 382 – Southgate tube station to Mill Hill East tube station
- 383 – Barnet (the Spires) to Woodside Park tube station – Monday to Saturday except late evenings
- 384 – Edgware Station to Cockfosters tube station

Railway stations nearby

- Oakleigh Park
- New Barnet

Tube stations nearby

- Arnos Grove – Piccadilly line
- Cockfosters – Piccadilly line
- Oakwood – Piccadilly line
- High Barnet – Northern line
- Totteridge & Whetstone – Northern line

== Education ==
Primary schools

- Danegrove Primary School (formerly Littlegrove Junior School and Oaklands Infant School)
- St Mary's School
- Church Hill School
- Monkfrith School

Secondary schools

- East Barnet School

== Culture ==
Bodens Performing Arts School, a.k.a. Bodens, is located in East Barnet. It was founded in 1973 in Enfield, and has since moved to its current site. It is a performing arts school offering Arts education to children and teenagers from the ages of 3 to 18. The Studios are located on East Barnet Road, along with the Tony Boden Theatre, which is on the premises.

== Notable people ==
- Alan Coren (born 1938) grew up in East Barnet, and attended Osidge Primary and East Barnet School.
- Marie Frances Lisette Hanbury, Baroness Willoughby de Broke, was born in East Barnet.
