= New Barnet Methodist Chapel =

Methodist chapel in London

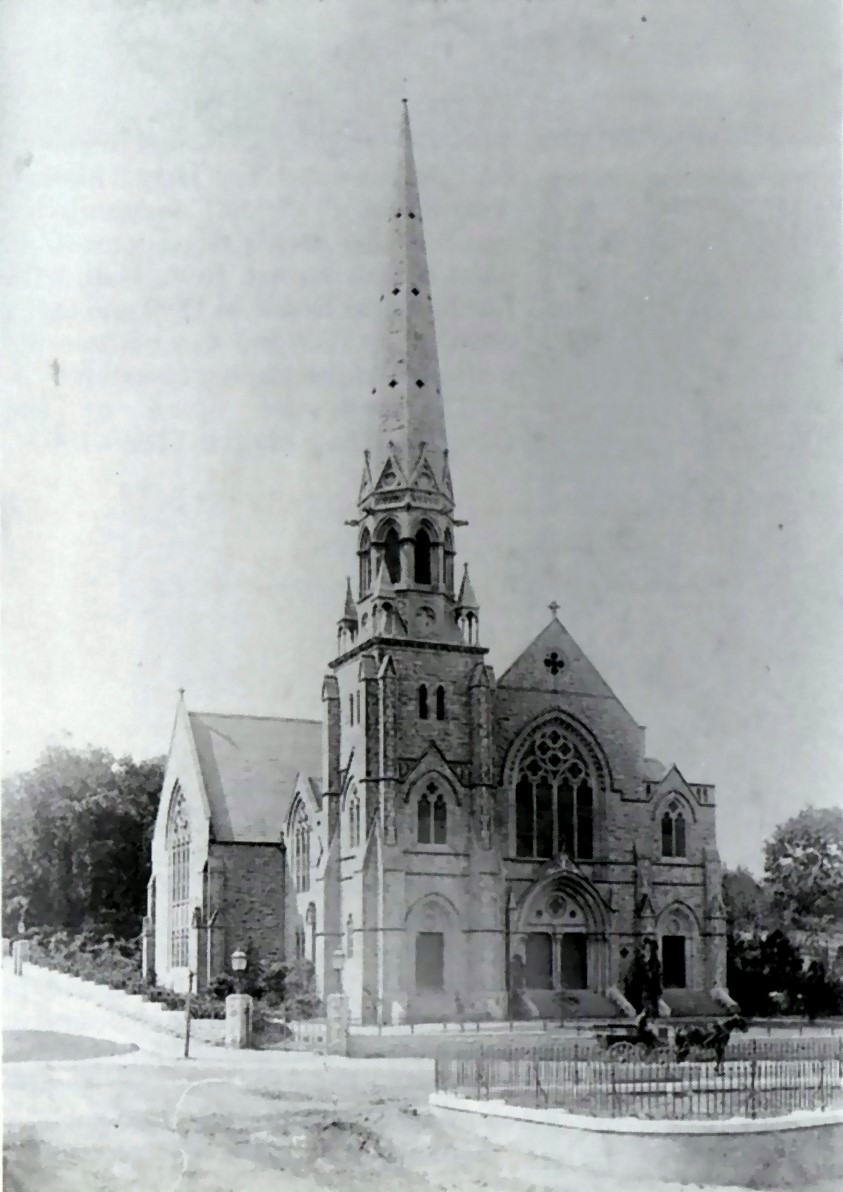
- New Barnet Methodist Chapel, showing in the foreground the site on which New Barnet War Memorial was built in 1921.

- Location of New Barnet Methodist Chapel in England
- 51°38′58.31″N 0°10′31.17″W
- Location: New Barnet, London
- Country: England
- Denomination: Methodist

History
- Founded: 1880

Architecture
- Demolished: 1963

New Barnet Methodist Chapel was a Methodist chapel that once existed on the corner of Station Road and Lyonsdown Road in New Barnet, London.

== History ==
The chapel opened in 1880 and replaced a temporary building elsewhere. Some £4,000 was raised for its construction, with an additional £3,000 contribution from the Methodist Chapel Building Fund, making the newly established suburb of New Barnet one of the better off circuits and contrasting with poorer areas that struggled to raise the necessary monies for chapel building. It was demolished in 1963 and replaced with an office building known as Kingmaker House.

The minister in the 1940s was Frederick Howell Everson, a Methodist author and former journalist.
