= E. Fergusson Taylor =

English temperance campaigner

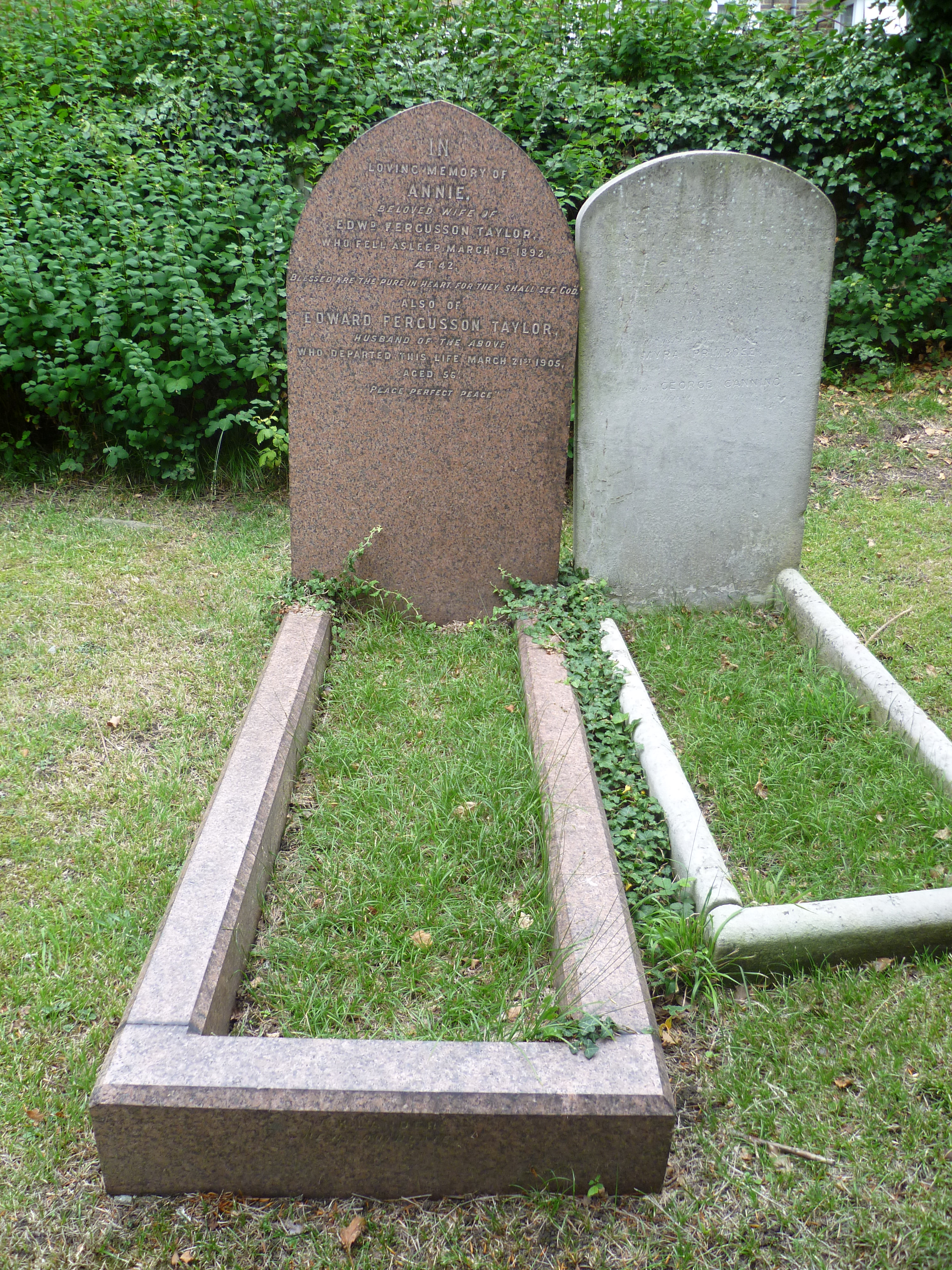
Edward Fergusson Taylor's grave in East Barnet churchyard.

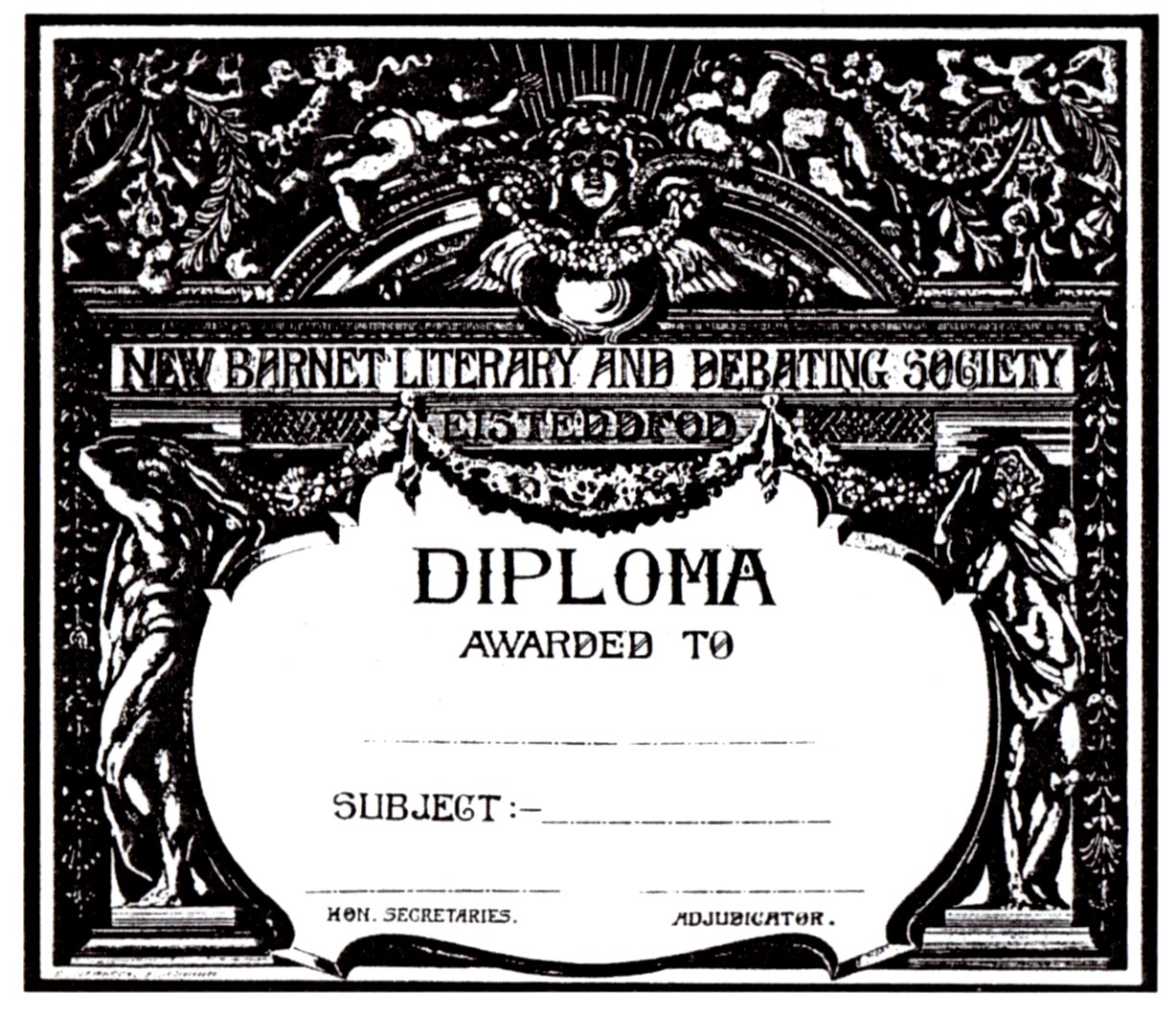
Certificate for the New Barnet Literary And Debating Society Eisteddfod held at Lytton Road Assembly Rooms in 1900.

Edward Fergusson Taylor (c. 1849 – 21 March 1905) was an English temperance campaigner, estate agent, surveyor and property developer who was instrumental in the development of New Barnet in north London.

== Early life and family ==
Edward Fergusson Taylor was born in St Paul's, Covent Garden, London. He married Annie (born c.1850). Their youngest son, George, died aged 3 at Bracon Ash, New Barnet, on 8 March 1887. They had a second son, also Edward Fergusson Taylor. Annie died on 1 March 1892 from pneumonia following influenza.

== Career ==
Taylor was an estate agent, surveyor and property developer who was instrumental in the development of New Barnet. He encouraged the construction of churches and a town hall. He was a temperance campaigner and promoted the erection of a temperance hall and a coffee house to attract people away from alcohol.

He built the Lytton Road Assembly Rooms in New Barnet around 1870 which became a cinema in 1925 and was replaced with a purpose-built building in 1926 known as the Hippodrome, the Kinema, and the Regal from 1933. The 1871 census, when he was aged 22, records his occupation as "Stationer and House Agent".

In 1888 he was practicing from 55 Chancery Lane in the City of London and from New Barnet, and in 1895 from 70 and 72 Chancery Lane. In 1895 he held an auction sale of leasehold properties in New Barnet at the Assembly Rooms there, one of a number of such sales he held. He advertised extensively in London papers for the sale or lease of property in north London, particularly in New Barnet and Lyonsdown.

== Politics ==
Taylor was active in the Barnet Conservative Association which met at the Assembly Rooms in New Barnet, proposing a motion in 1887 in support of the British government's Irish policy and the actions of Unionist leaders. The motion was passed. His son Edward later became a Conservative Party councillor in Finchley.

== Death and legacy ==
Taylor died on 21 March 1905. He is buried with his wife Annie in the same grave at St Mary the Virgin, East Barnet. Probate was obtained by Eveline Blanche Taylor, spinster, Edward Fergusson Taylor, auctioneer, and Arthur Leonard Ferriday, auctioneer's clerk. His business was continued by his son Edward.
