= Holy Trinity Church, Matlock Bath =

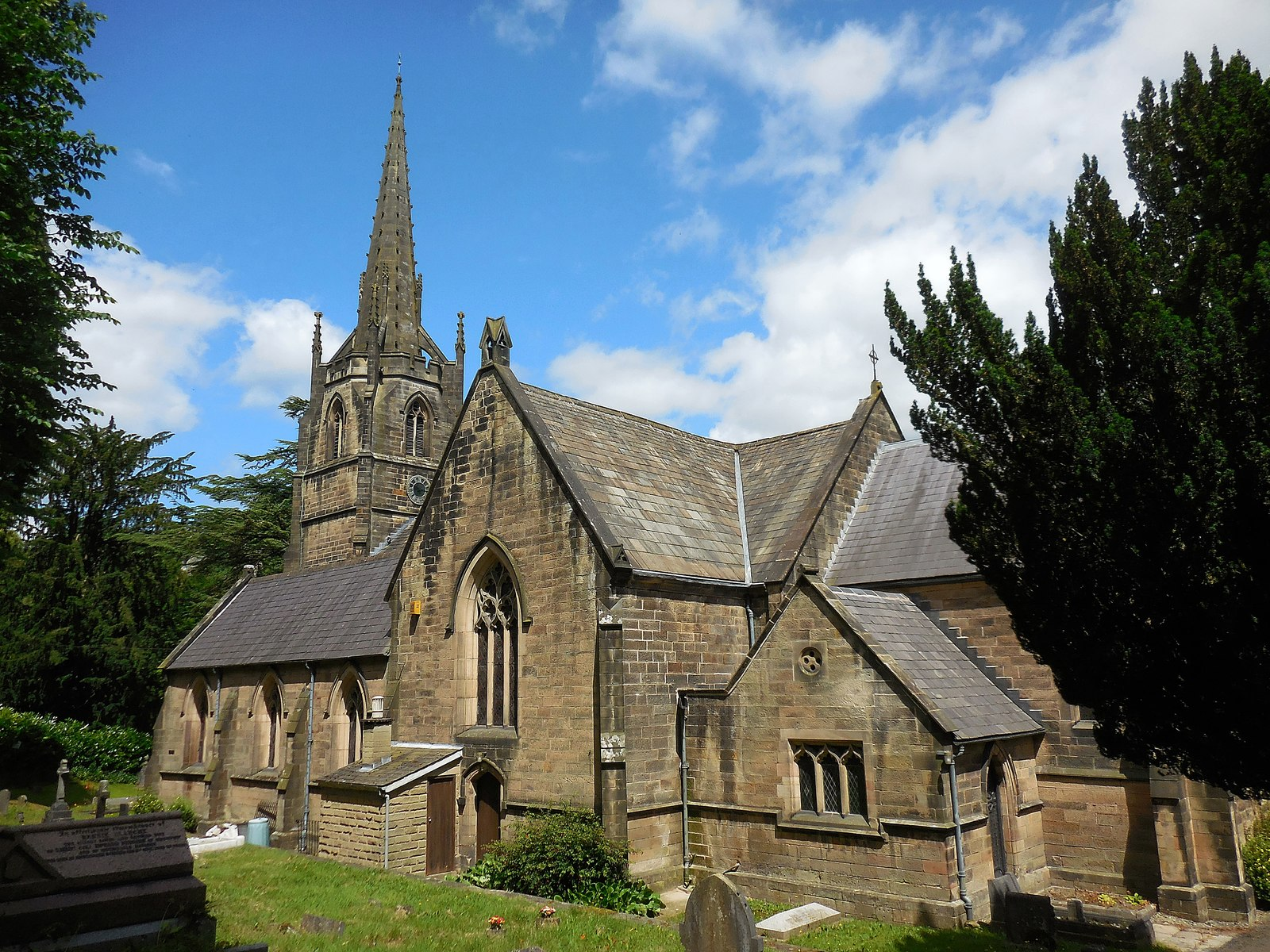
- Holy Trinity Church, Matlock Bath

- Location within Derbyshire
- 53°07′3.22″N 1°33′41.18″W
- Location: Matlock Bath, Derbyshire
- Country: England
- Denomination: Church of England
- Website: holytrinitymatlockbath.org.uk

History
- Dedication: Holy Trinity
- Consecrated: 4 October 1842

Architecture
- Heritage designation: Grade II listed
- Designated: 26 October 1972
- Architect(s): John Grey Weightman and Matthew Ellison Hadfield
- Groundbreaking: 8 June 1841

Administration
- Province: Canterbury
- Diocese: Derby
- Archdeaconry: Chesterfield
- Deanery: Wirksworth
- Parish: Matlock Bath

Clergy
- Vicar: Stephen Monk

Holy Trinity Church, Matlock Bath is a Grade II listed parish church in the Church of England in Matlock Bath, Derbyshire.

== History ==
The foundation stone was laid on 9 June 1841 when an inscription was enclosed in a glass vessel deposited in a cavity in the foundations. The inscription as recorded in the Sheffield Iris of 15 June 1841 read

To the glory of God, and for the salvation of man, the first stone of a church, to be dedicated to the Holy Trinity, built and endowed by voluntary subscription, and designed for the worship of Almighty God, according to the doctrine and discipline of the Apostolic Reformed Church of England and Ireland, was laid by the Venerable Walter Augustus Shirley, M.A., Archdeacon of Derby, on Wednesday, the 9th of June, in the year of our Lord, 1841, and in the fourth year of the reign of her most gracious majesty Queen Victoria. The Rev. W. Melville, M.A., Rector of Matlock; Messrs. Weightman and Hadfield, Architects.

The church was built by John Grey Weightman and Matthew Ellison Hadfield of Sheffield and consecrated on 4 October 1842 by the Bishop of Hereford Rt. Revd. Thomas Musgrave (acting for the Bishop of Lichfield who was ill).

It was enlarged in 1873–74 by T.E. Streatfeild who added a south aisle, lengthened the chancel and added the vestry and organ chamber. The reredos was installed in 1874.

In the 1970s, the interior was re-ordered. The south aisle and west end of the nave were partitioned off and cleared. A baptistry was installed in the floor of the crossing, and the nave floors were raised.

== Vicars of Holy Trinity ==
- William Gibbs Barker 1842–1853
- Edward Synge 1853–1859
- John Martin Maynard 1859–1865
- Charles Evans 1865–1869
- Raymond P. Pelly 1869–1874
- Edward Latham 1875–1883
- Charles Baker 1883–1914
- William Askwith 1914–1921
- Edward J.M. Davies 1921–1929
- Clement T. Walker 1929–1934
- Alfred Phibbs 1934–1944
- William G. Lee 1944–1950
- Norman B. Johnston 1950–1955
- L.E. Waghorn 1955–1958
- H.E. Brown 1958–1966
- James Song 1966–1977
- H. Collard 1977–1992
- J. Wheatley Price 1992–1997
- John Currin 1997–2007
- Nick Grayshon 2007–2024
- Stephen Monk 2024–

== Stained glass ==
- Nave window, Ward and Hughes 1889, the Good Samaritan
- North transept, 1923, the Nativity.

== Parish status ==
The church is in a United Benefice with St Mary's Church, Cromford.

== Organ ==
The pipe organ was built by William Hill in 1876 at a cost of £350 (equivalent to £34,900 in 2025). It was opened on 18 April 1876 by Arthur Smith, organist of St Werburgh's Church, Derby. A specification of the organ can be found on the National Pipe Organ Register. It was replaced by an electronic instrument in 1975. The pipework remained until 1993 when it was dispersed.

=== Organists ===
- John Goddard Barker 1884–89 (afterwards organist of All Saints' Church, Matlock Bank)
- Phyllis Wright 1944–1966

== See also ==
- Listed buildings in Matlock Bath
