= Albert Road gas holder =

Decommissioned gas holder

Coordinates: 51.65367°N 0.17229°W

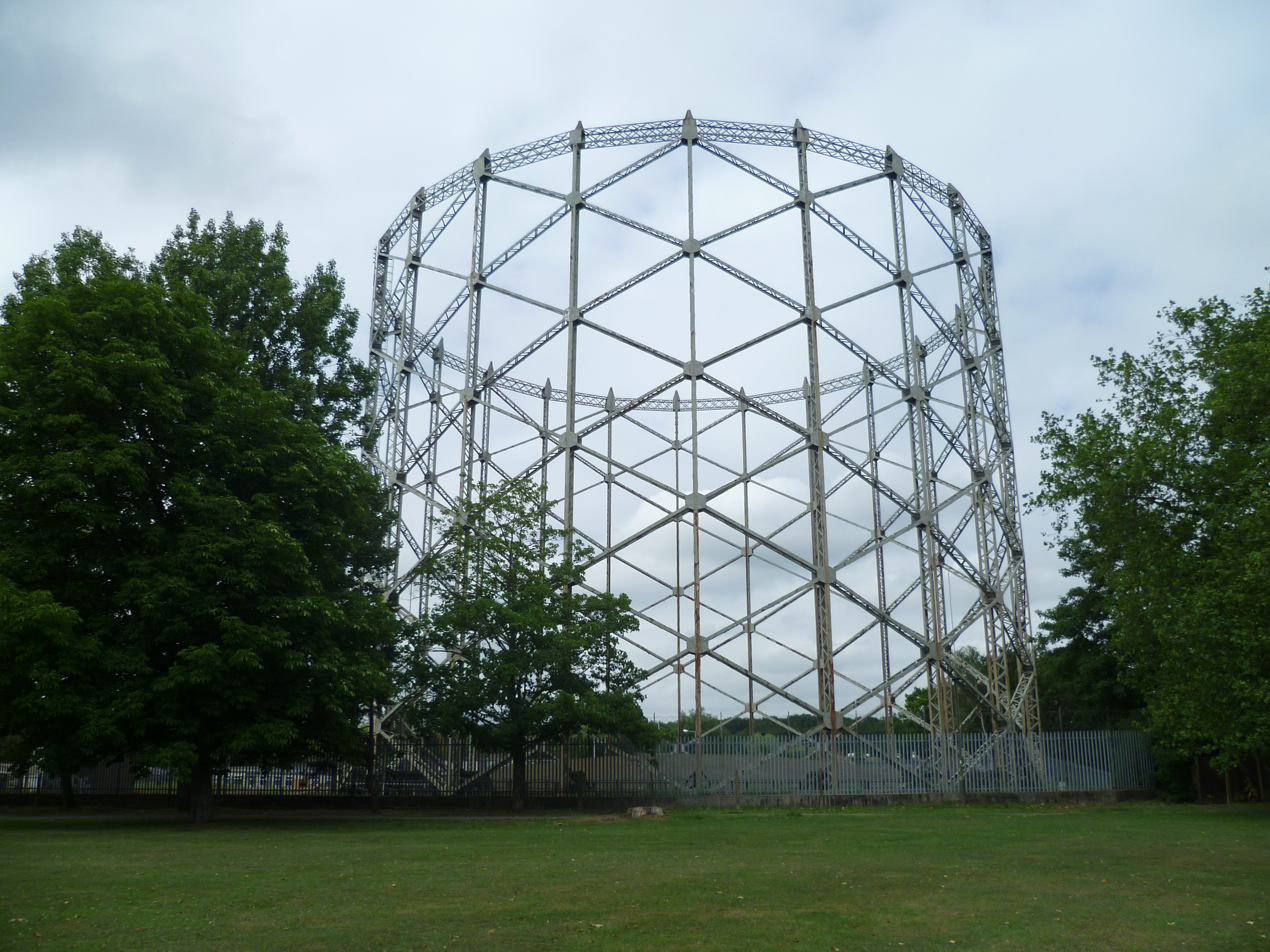
The Albert Road gas holder

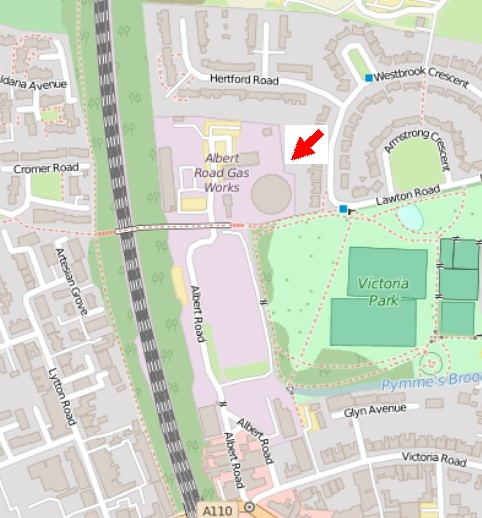
Location of the gas holder.

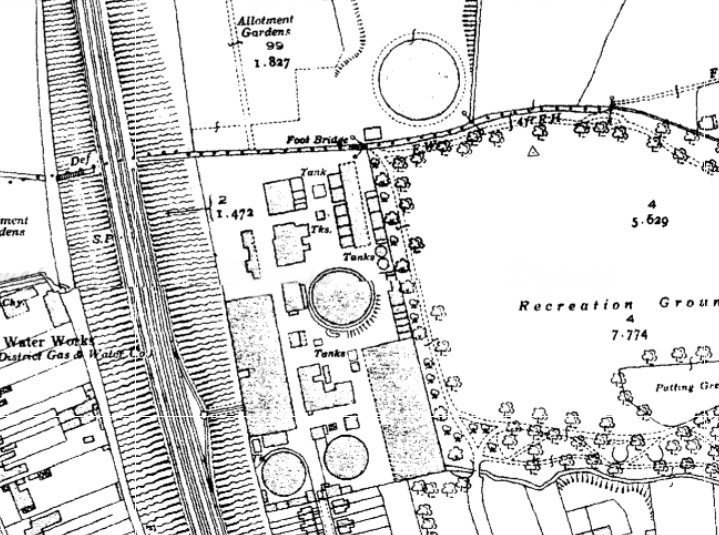
The site on a 1930s Ordnance Survey map.

The Albert Road gas holder in New Barnet, north London, is a disused gas holder on the site of the former New Barnet Gas Works with a capacity of 2 million cubic feet (57×10^{3} m^{3}) of gas. It was built for the Barnet & District Gas and Water Company and came into use in 1934 (92 years ago). It was decommissioned around 2009 (17 years ago).

== Site ==
The holder is to the east of Albert Road on the north part of the former New Barnet Gas Works site adjacent to Victoria Park, Barnet.

The site was opened for the East Barnet Gas and Water Company (formed 1866) which in 1872 took over two local gas companies and became the Barnet & District Gas and Water Company. The company was nationalised in 1949 and became part of the Eastern Gas Board. Some time after 2000, Asda supermarkets acquired the site but plans for housing and a supermarket were not approved and they sold the area to the social housing provider One Housing.

== The holder ==
Gas holders have been present on the southern part of the site since at least the 1890s but the current, and last remaining, holder was not brought into use until 1934. It is column-guided with four concentric lifts and a capacity of 2,000,000 cubic feet of gas. After the exploitation of North Sea gas began in the 1960s the gas works on the rest of the site was demolished and a high pressure pipeline installed with the remaining holder retained just for low pressure storage to cope with diurnal peak demand on the system. It was decommissioned around 2009, and does not form part of the infrastructure network for the supply of gas.

== Gallery ==
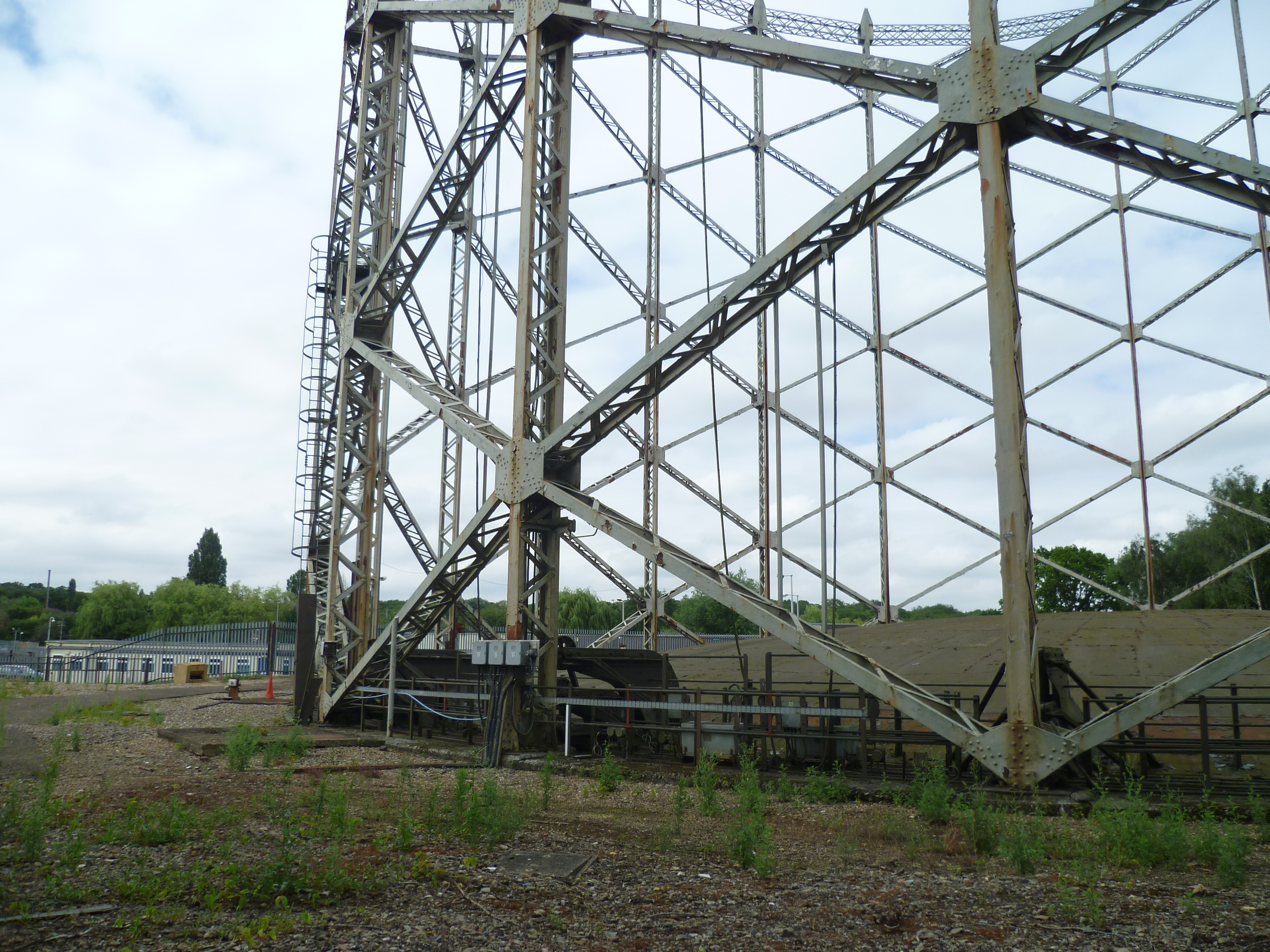

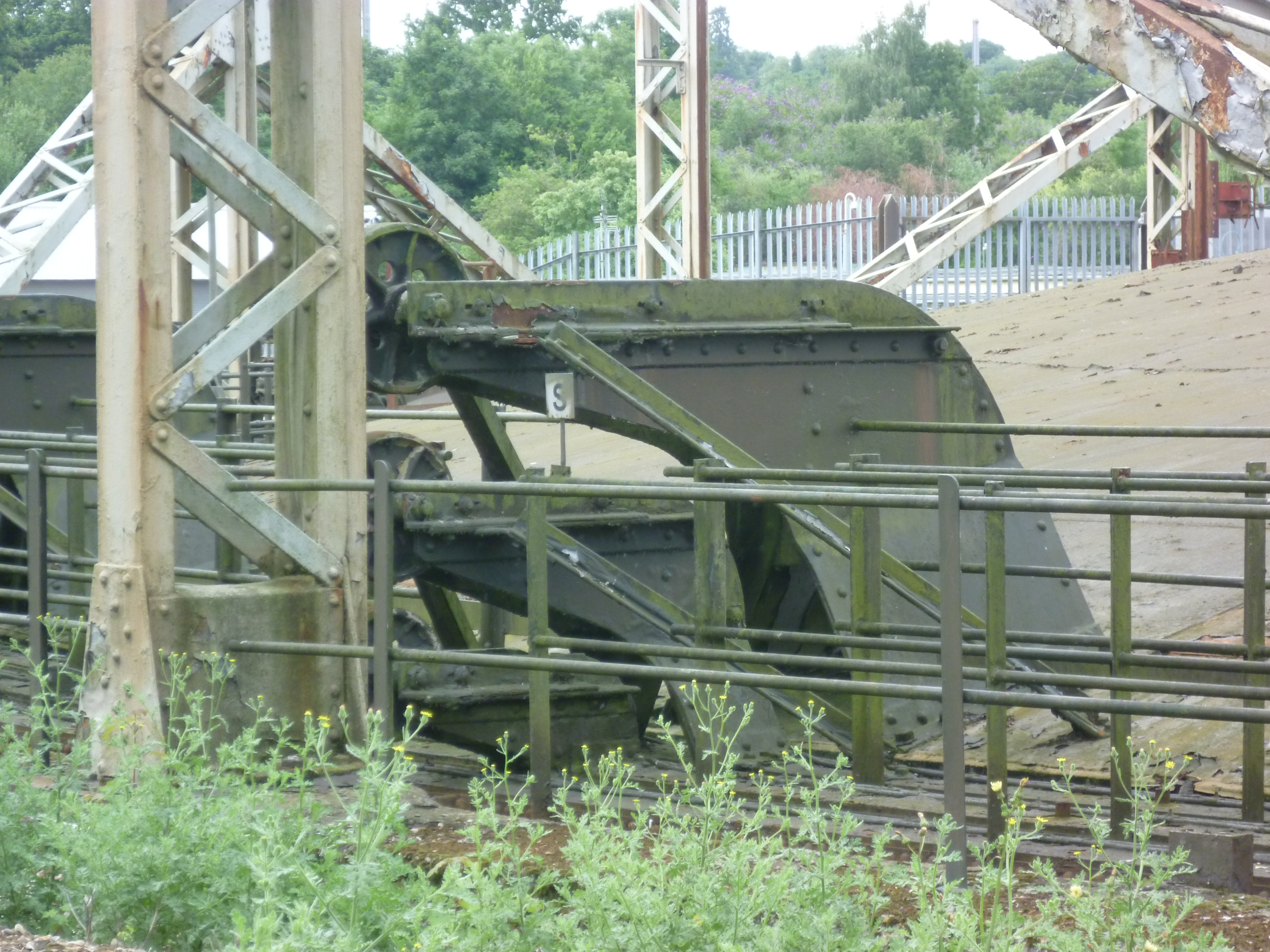

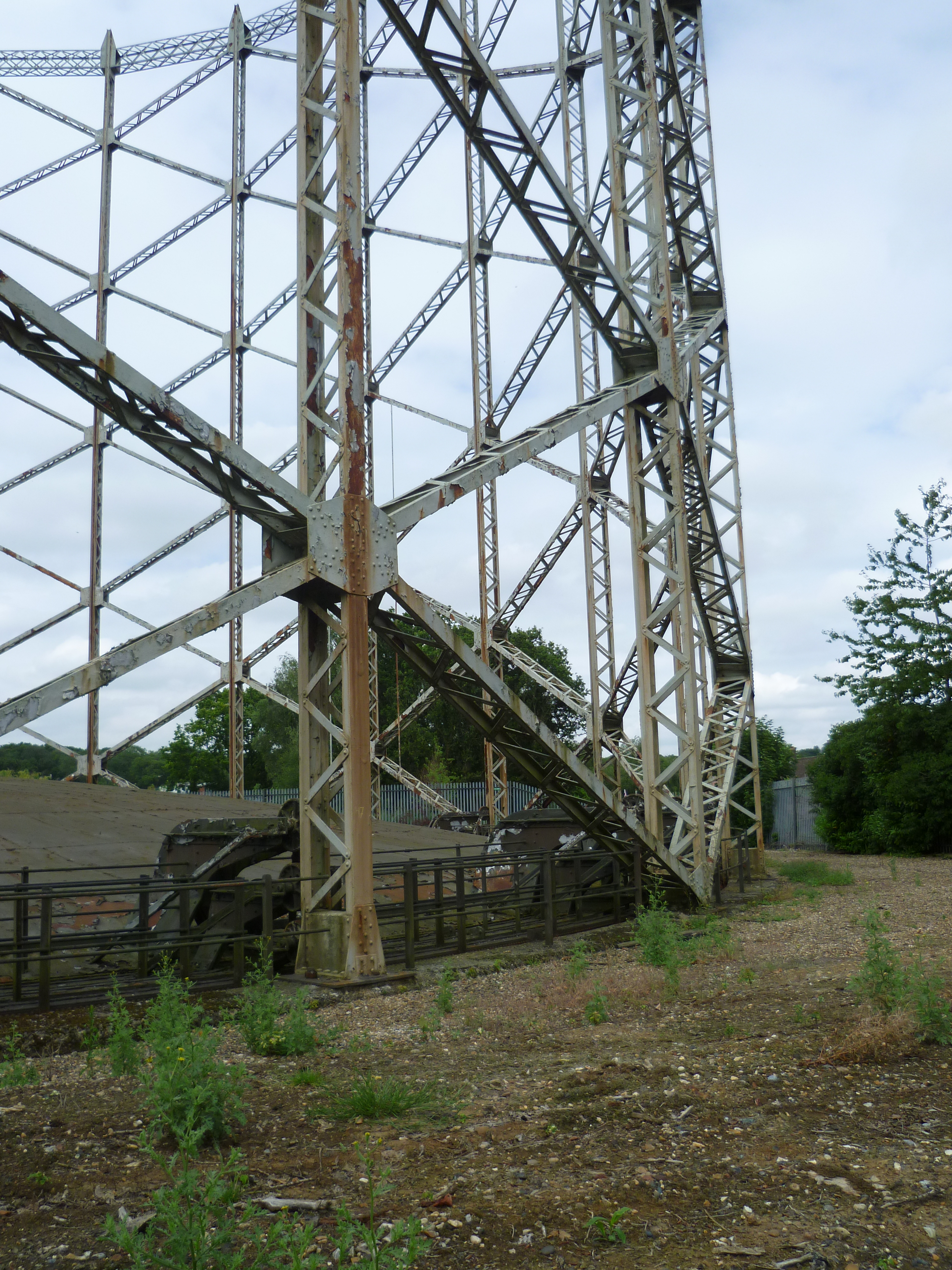
