= William Gibbs Barker =

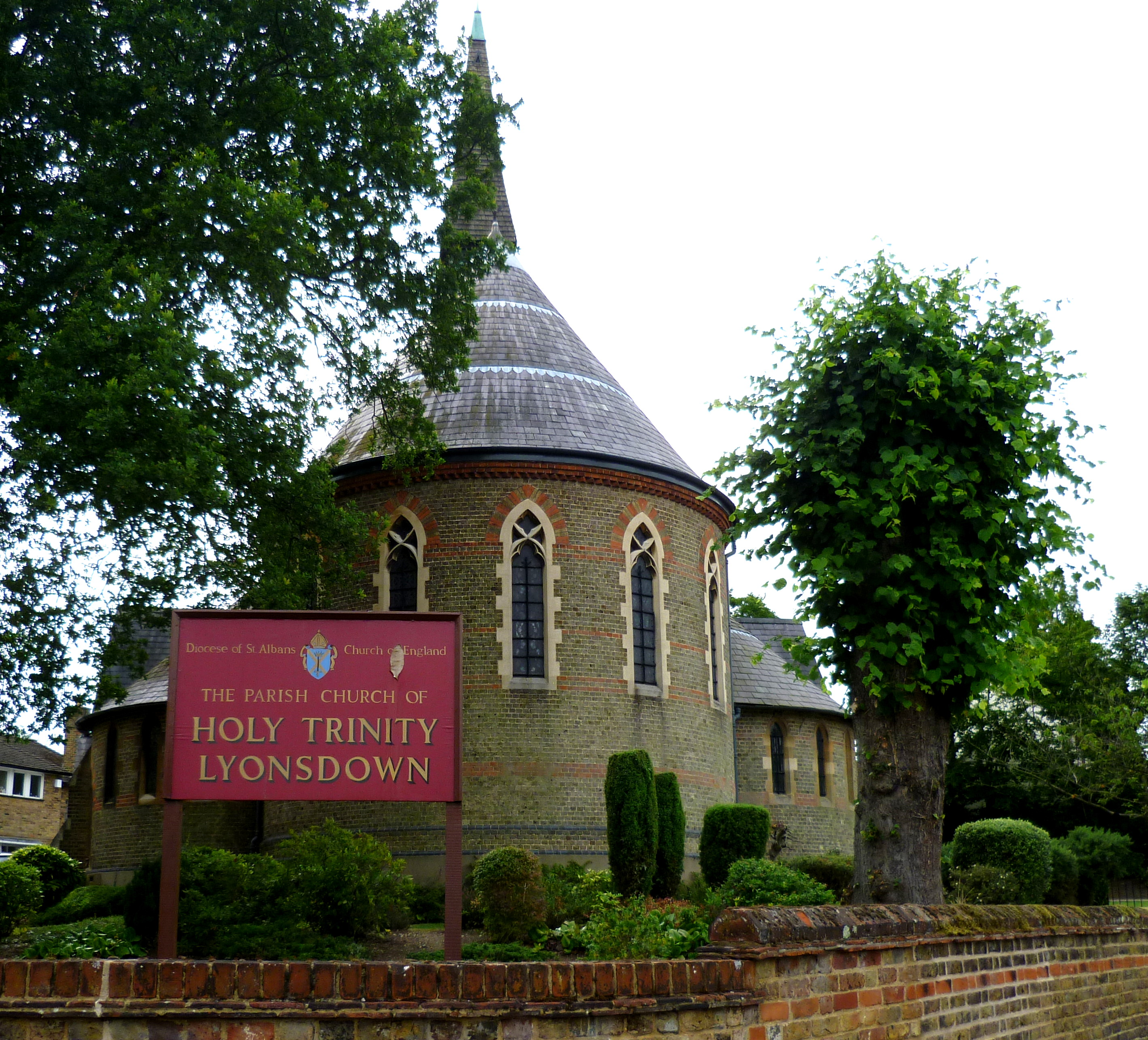
Holy Trinity Lyonsdown

The Rev. William Gibbs Barker (1811 – 14 November 1897) was an English clergyman and genealogist. Barker became incumbent of St Paul's, Walsall, in 1839 after he became head master of the Free Grammar School there to which the incumbency of that church was attached.

In 1844 he was appointed minister of Holy Trinity Church, Matlock Bath, Derbyshire.

Barker was the first incumbent of Holy Trinity Lyonsdown when that parish was formed in 1865 but became blind in 1867 and resigned at that time.

Barker died 14 November 1897 at Sidcup.

== Selected publications ==
- The Doctrine and Practice of the Church of Rome, in the Dispensation of Indulgences; a Sermon ... Being the Eleventh of a Course of Sermons “on the Errors of the Church of Rome” &c. T. Simpson, 1840.
- Friendly strictures upon certain portions of the Rev. E. B. Elliott's Horae Apocalypticae. London, J. Nisbet & Co., 1847.
- The pedigree of the family of Barker of Salop &c. London, 1877.
