= East Barnet Town Hall =

Municipal building in London, England

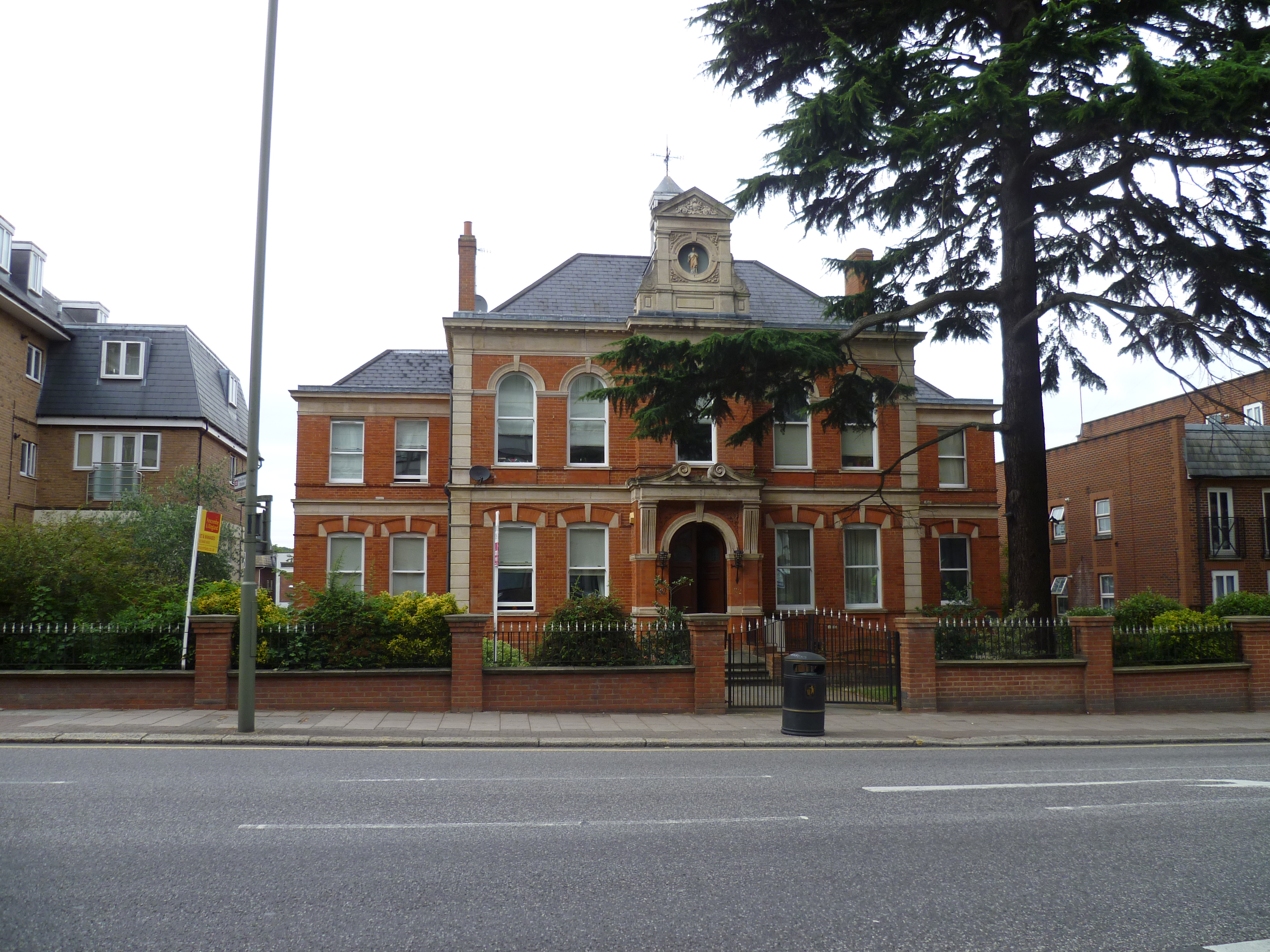
- East Barnet Town Hall

- Shown in Barnet
- 51.6500°N 0.1757°W
- Location: Station Road, East Barnet

History
- Built: 1892

Site notes
- Architect: Frederick William Shenton
- Architectural style: Italianate style

East Barnet Town Hall is a former municipal building in Station Road, East Barnet, London, England. The town hall, which was the headquarters of East Barnet Urban District Council, is a locally listed building.

== History ==
The building was commissioned by the East Barnet Valley Local Board, which was formed in 1863, to serve as its municipal offices: the site they selected was open land on the north side of New Barnet Road (now known as Station Road) just south of the public baths. Following a design competition, which was won by Frederick William Shenton of Whetstone, construction of the new building commenced in 1891. It was designed in the Italianate style, built using red bricks with stone dressings and officially opened in 1892. The design involved a symmetrical main frontage with nine bays facing onto Station Road; the central section of five bays, which projected forward, featured an arched doorway with a tympanum flanked by brackets supporting an entablature; there were round headed windows in the other bays on the ground floor and in all bays on the first floor. At roof level there was a cornice with dentils; there was also a small turret with a weather vane above.

The building became the headquarters of East Barnet Urban District Council in 1894 and benefited from the installation of a pediment containing a clock and chime of bells, cast by John Warner & Sons, in 1898. Pevsner subsequently described the style of the building as "modest Italianate with a clock tower".

The New Barnet War Memorial, designed by Newbury Abbot Trent to commemorate the lives of service personnel who had died in the First World War, was unveiled opposite the town hall by the Lord Lieutenant of Hertfordshire, Lord Hampden on 20 March 1921. The building ceased to be the local seat of government when the East Barnet Urban District was transferred from Hertfordshire to Greater London on the formation of the London Borough of Barnet in 1965; however it was retained by the new London Borough Council, serving until the mid-1980s as the Northern Division Planning Office. The town hall was identified as a "building of local architectural or historic interest" and placed on the local list on 30 April 1986.

After local government use of the building ceased it was sold by the council in 1988. It then stood empty for a time, during which the clock and the bells were stolen. (Some of the bells were subsequently recovered and put on display by the Barnet Museum; however the bells were stolen from the museum in 2010 and have not since been recovered.)

The building was converted for use as a restaurant in 1996. It traded initially as an Italian restaurant under the "Mamma Amalfi" brand (during which a Roman statue was placed in the space where the clock had been). Later it was as a Greek restaurant known as "The Palace". It was converted for residential use as a block of apartments known as "Chambers Court" in 2007.
