= St Mark's Church, Barnet Vale =

Coordinates: 51.6531°N 0.1849°W

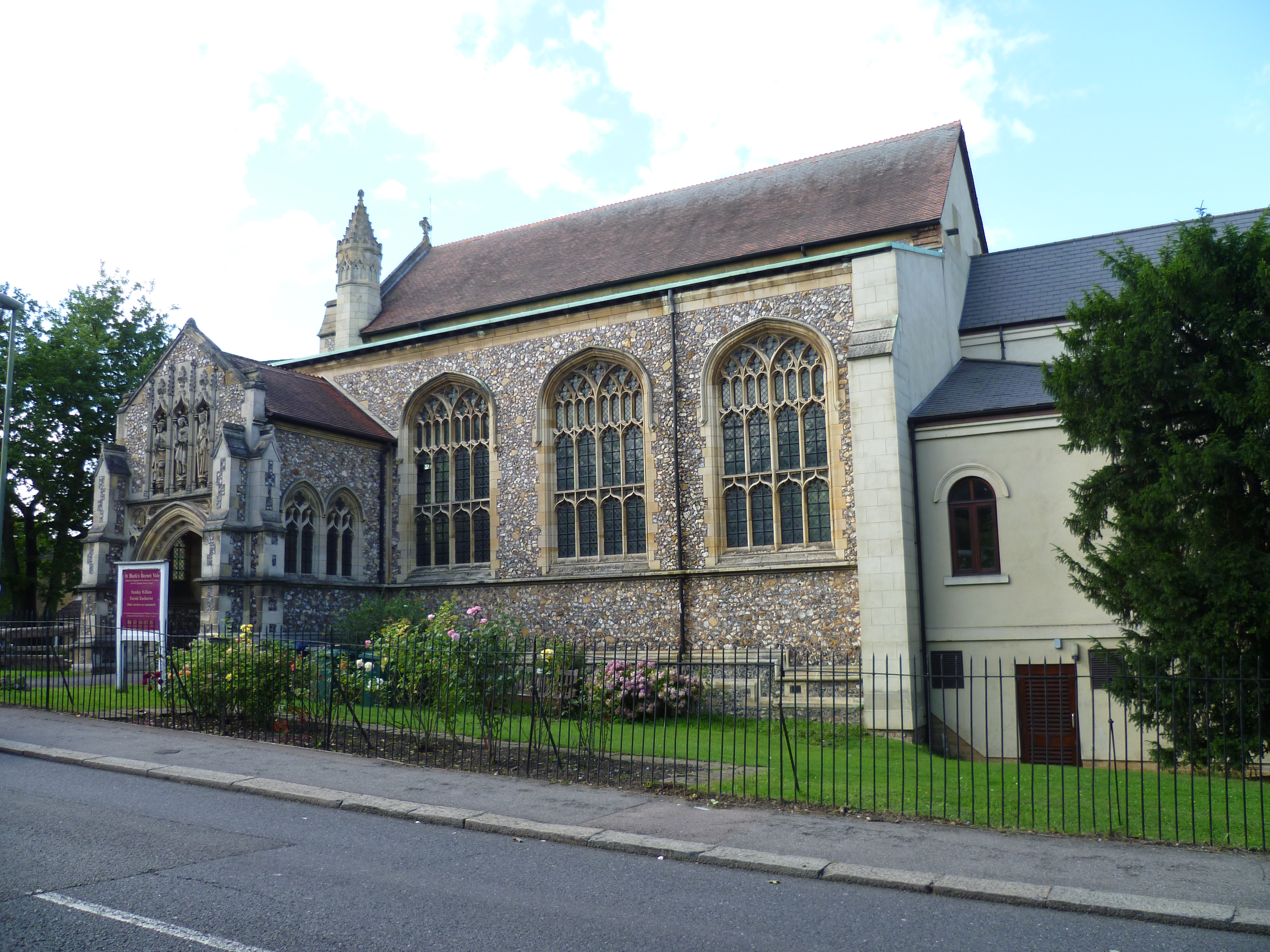
- St Mark's Church, Barnet Vale
- OS grid reference: TQ 25655 96481
- Location: Potters Road, Barnet Vale, EN5 5HY
- Country: England
- Denomination: Church of England
- Previous denomination: Traditional Catholic
- Website: Church website

History
- Status: Active

Architecture
- Functional status: Parish church
- Heritage designation: Grade II listed
- Architect: John Loughborough Pearson
- Style: Neo-perpendicular Gothic
- Years built: 1897-9

Administration
- Diocese: Diocese of St Albans
- Archdeaconry: Archdeaconry of Hertford
- Parish: Chipping Barnet

Clergy
- Vicar: The Revd Tristan Chapman

St Mark's Church, Barnet Vale is the Church of England parish church for Barnet Vale. It is located in the Diocese of St Albans. It is a Grade II listed building.

== Building ==
The church building began as the work of John Loughborough Pearson in a neo-perpendicular Gothic style, but was completed after his death. A red brick chancel with tiled roofs was later included. A bricked-up entrance exists for the tower which was never built. The church contains fittings designed by William Butterfield.

== Memorials ==
The south porch contains three niches with ogee hoods containing three statues by Nathaniel Hitch, one of which is dedicated to Lieutenant Cyril Catford.

== People ==
In the early twentieth century the parish organist was W. R. Driffill.
