= East Barnet Urban District =

Former local authority in the United Kingdom

Coordinates: 51.643°N 0.161°W

East Barnet East Barnet Valley (1874–1935)
- Local Government District (1874–1894); Urban District (1894–1965)
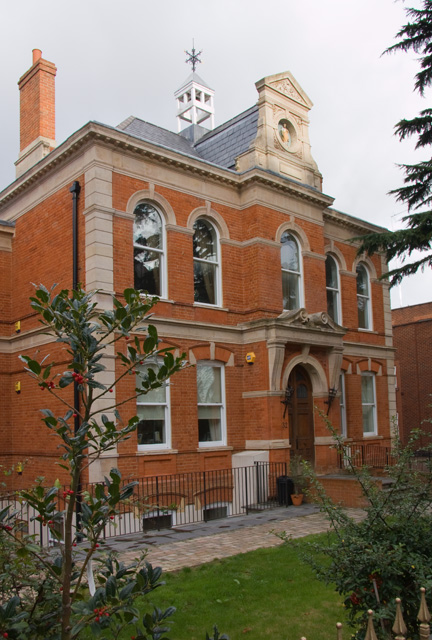
- East Barnet Town Hall
- Interactive map of East Barnet
- Area
  - 1911: 2,644 acres (10.70 km^{2})
  - 1961: 2,644 acres (10.70 km^{2})
- Population
  - 1911: 12,381
  - 1961: 40,641
- History
  - Created: 1 October 1874
  - Abolished: 31 March 1965
  - Succeeded by: London Borough of Barnet
- Status: Local government district (1874–1894); Urban district (1894–1965)
- Government: East Barnet Valley Local Board (1874–1894); East Barnet Valley Urban District Council (1894–1935); East Barnet Urban District Council (1935–1965)
  - HQ: Station Road, New Barnet
  - Motto: Willingness rids way
- Coat of arms

East Barnet was a local government district from 1874 to 1965 around the town of East Barnet. It was partly in the counties of Hertfordshire and Middlesex until 1889, when the Middlesex part was transferred to Hertfordshire. The district was called East Barnet Valley from its creation in 1874 until 1935 when it was renamed East Barnet.

== History ==
The East Barnet Valley local government district was created on 1 October 1874. The district was governed by an elected local board. Apart from the parish of East Barnet, the district included parts of the neighbouring parishes of Chipping Barnet in Hertfordshire and Monken Hadley in Middlesex.

When elected county councils were established in 1889 under the Local Government Act 1888, local government districts such as East Barnet Valley which straddled county boundaries were placed entirely in the county which had the majority of the district's population at the previous census in 1881. The parts of the East Barnet Valley district that had been in Middlesex were therefore transferred to Hertfordshire.

The local board built itself East Barnet Town Hall on Station Road to serve as its headquarters. The building was completed in 1892.

Local government districts were reconstituted as urban districts under the Local Government Act 1894. The local board was therefore replaced by an urban district council. The 1894 Act also directed that civil parishes were no longer allowed to straddle district boundaries, and so the parishes in the East Barnet Valley Urban District were reorganised into three civil parishes, shown below with their area in 1901:

- East Barnet (1,697 acres)
- Barnet Vale (the area formerly in Chipping Barnet parish) (279 acres)
- Monken Hadley (the parts formerly in Middlesex) (668 acres)

The urban district was renamed East Barnet in 1935.

The district formed part of a long, thin protrusion into Middlesex and was surrounded by that county on three sides; to the north, east and south.

In 1965, the urban district was abolished by the London Government Act 1963 and its former area transferred from Hertfordshire to Greater London. Its former area was combined with that of other districts to form the present-day London Borough of Barnet.

== Coat of arms ==
The urban district council adopted an unofficial coat of arms consisting of a shield bearing crossed swords between a red rose of Lancaster and a white rose of York and the Greek letter omega. This design represented the Battle of Barnet, the final battle in the Wars of the Roses. The chief or top third of the shield showed a fleur de lys between two flory crosses, emblems of St Mary, the patron saint of the ancient parish of East Barnet. In 1955 this became the basis for an official grant from the College of Arms. A crest was added above the shield: a hart from the arms of Hertfordshire County Council, with a shield hanging from the neck bearing the cross of St Alban for the historical associations of the Abbey of St Albans with the area. The motto adopted: Willingness Rids Way, was from Shakespeare's Henry VI, Part 3. It comes from a speech made by Edward IV following the Battle of Barnet.

== Population ==
The area of the urban district was 2,644 acres (10.7 km^{2}). The population, as returned at the census, was:

Year	1901	1911	1921	1931	1941	1951	1961
Population	10,094	12,381	13,514	18,549		40,408	40,641

== Politics ==
The urban district was divided into seven wards for elections: Brunswick Park, Cockfosters, East Barnet, Hadley, Lyonsdown, New Barnet and Osidge.

=== Parliament constituency ===
For elections to Parliament, the urban district was part of the constituency of:

- Mid or St Albans Division of Hertfordshire

In 1945 St Albans was divided as an emergency measure because its electorate exceeded 100,000 voters, with the urban district becoming part of the new constituency of:

- Barnet

== Gallery ==
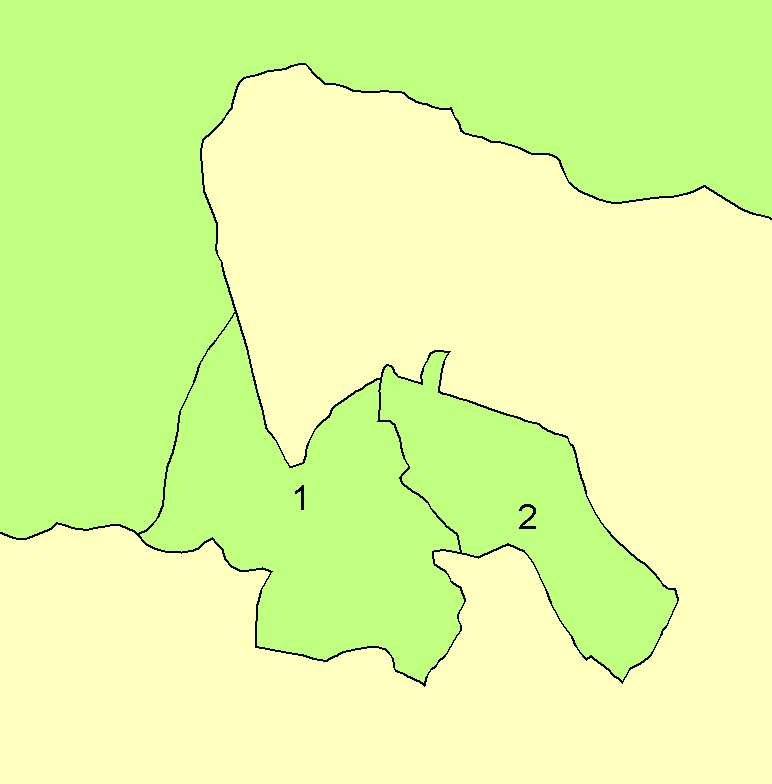
In 1961: 1 is Barnet and 2 is East Barnet

District in 1863.

District in 1894.

District in 1935.
