= New Barnet railway station =

National Rail station in London, England

New Barnet
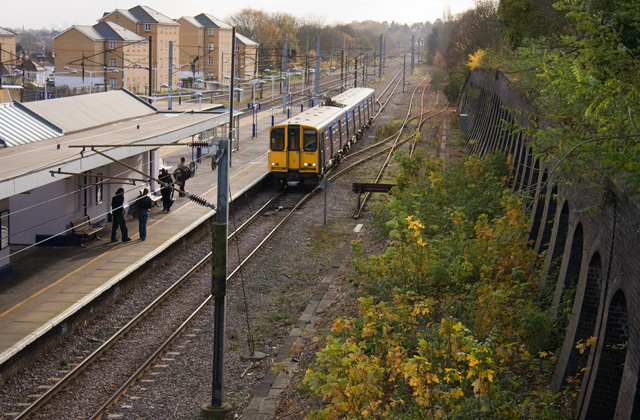
- Interactive map of New Barnet

General information
- Location: New Barnet
- Local authority: London Borough of Barnet
- Managed by: Great Northern
- Station code: NBA
- DfT category: D
- Number of platforms: 4
- Fare zone: 5

National Rail annual entry and exit
- 2020–21: ▼0.368 million
- 2021–22: ▲0.765 million
- 2022–23: ▲1.083 million
- 2023–24: ▲1.166 million
- 2024–25: ▲1.273 million

Key dates
- 7 August 1850: Station opened as Barnet
- 1 May 1884: Renamed New Barnet

Other information
- External links: Departures; Facilities
- Coordinates: 51.6487°N 0.1733°W

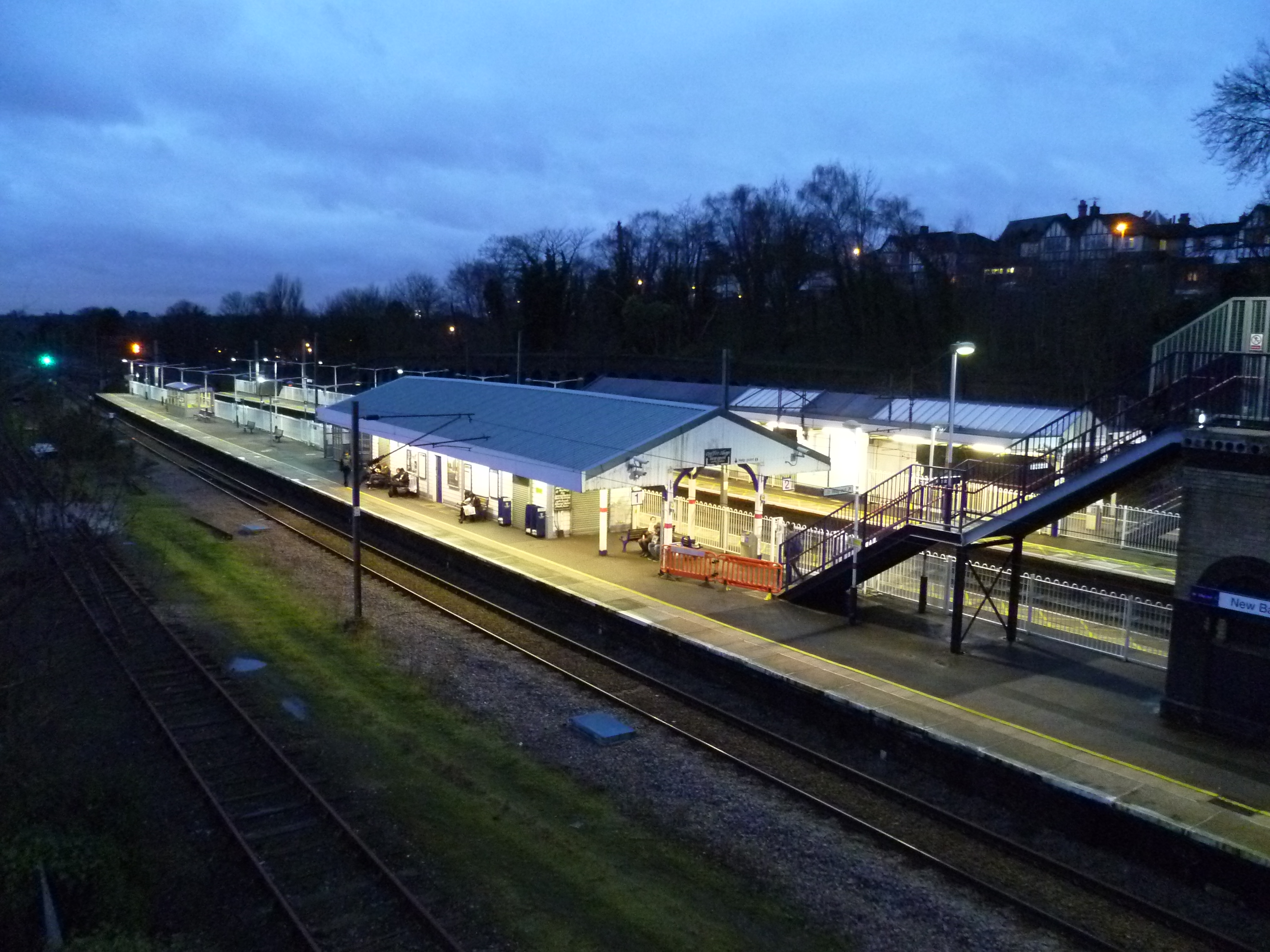
New Barnet railway station at night

New Barnet railway station is in the London Borough of Barnet in north London, England. It is 9 miles 12 chains (14.7 km) down the line from London King's Cross, in London fare zone 5. The station is managed and served by Great Northern. Oyster card pay-as-you-go can now be used to and from this station as well as on the majority of National Rail services in Greater London.

== History ==
The main line of the Great Northern Railway (GNR) between Peterborough and London (Maiden Lane) was opened on 7 August 1850; and Barnet was one of the original stations on the line. On 1 May 1884, the station was renamed New Barnet. The goods yard closed in 1966. In 1896, the station was rebuilt to its modern form by re-siting the down platform opposite the existing up platform and providing a new brick structure on the new platform.

On 7 July 1989, the original station booking office, mounted on the station bridge linking the platforms, was badly damaged in an arson attack. The building had just undergone an expensive restoration which made it one of the best such structures in the London area. A Nissen hut was provided in replacement on the western side of the station before a permanent structure was eventually provided.

== Facilities ==
Following a major station refurbishment in 2005, a café was opened in the previously unused building on the southbound, central London-bound platform. In autumn 2008, a new SHERE self-service ticket machine, accepting both cash and credit cards, was installed here (and similarly at other local stations). The station serves the area of New Barnet and the small shopping parade around East Barnet Road.

== Services ==
Off-peak, all services at New Barnet are operated by Great Northern using Class 717 EMUs.

The typical off-peak service in trains per hour is:

- 2 tph to Moorgate
- 2 tph to Welwyn Garden City

Additional services, including a number of Thameslink operated services to and from Sevenoaks via Catford, and Great Northern services to Kings Cross (morning peak only) call at the station during the peak hours.

Preceding station	National Rail	Following station
Oakleigh Park	Great Northern Great Northern Route Stopping Services	Hadley Wood
Oakleigh Park	Thameslink Thameslink Peak Hours Only	Potters Bar

== Connections ==
London Buses routes 107, 184, 307, 326, 383 and 384 serve the station.
