= New Barnet =

Area in London, England

Coordinates: 51.6440°N 0.1708°W

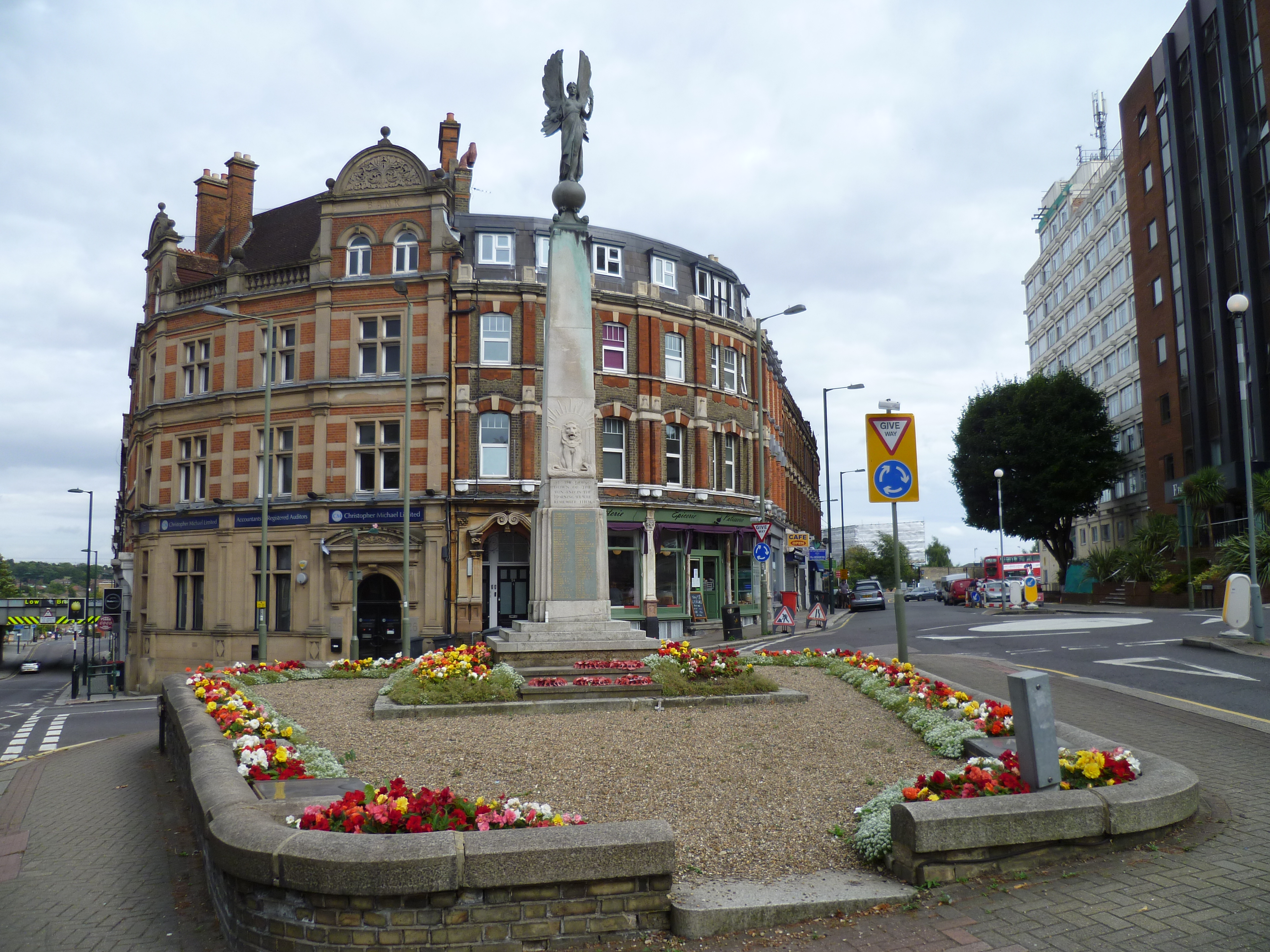
- New Barnet War Memorial and Station Approach

- Location within Greater London
- OS grid reference: TQ265955
- London borough: Barnet
- Ceremonial county: Greater London
- Region: London
- Country: England
- Sovereign state: United Kingdom
- Post town: BARNET
- Postcode district: EN4, EN5
- Dialling code: 020
- Police: Metropolitan
- Fire: London
- Ambulance: London
- UK Parliament: Chipping Barnet
- London Assembly: Barnet and Camden

New Barnet is a neighbourhood on the northeast side of the London Borough of Barnet. It is a largely residential North London suburb located east of Chipping Barnet, west of Cockfosters, south of the village of Monken Hadley and north of Oakleigh Park.

Residential properties include a mix of late Victorian villas and terraces, Edwardian detached housing, 1950-60s council housing and the redevelopment of land to low storey flats in the 1980s and 1990s. The north edge of New Barnet borders Monken Hadley Common, a common mostly made up of woods and cut by walking paths.

The main commercial area in New Barnet is east of New Barnet railway station on East Barnet Road. The high street is dominated by a medium-sized Sainsbury's supermarket with parking on top and is surrounded by a cluster of shops and facilities including Fayers, Just Add Water, PureGym, Tesco Express, Majestic Wine, Screwfix, Bikestrobe, Ink n Toner and Bodens Performing Arts. Several independent cafés also exist on the high street.

A number of office blocks were built on Station Road to the west of the station in the 1960s and 70s; however, many have now been converted to flats. In the past, Station Approach in New Barnet was the home of CompShop, which produced the pioneering UK101 kit microcomputer.

Public houses in New Barnet include The Railway Tavern, The Railway Bell (Wetherspoons), The Builders Arms, and The Lord Kitchener.

== History ==
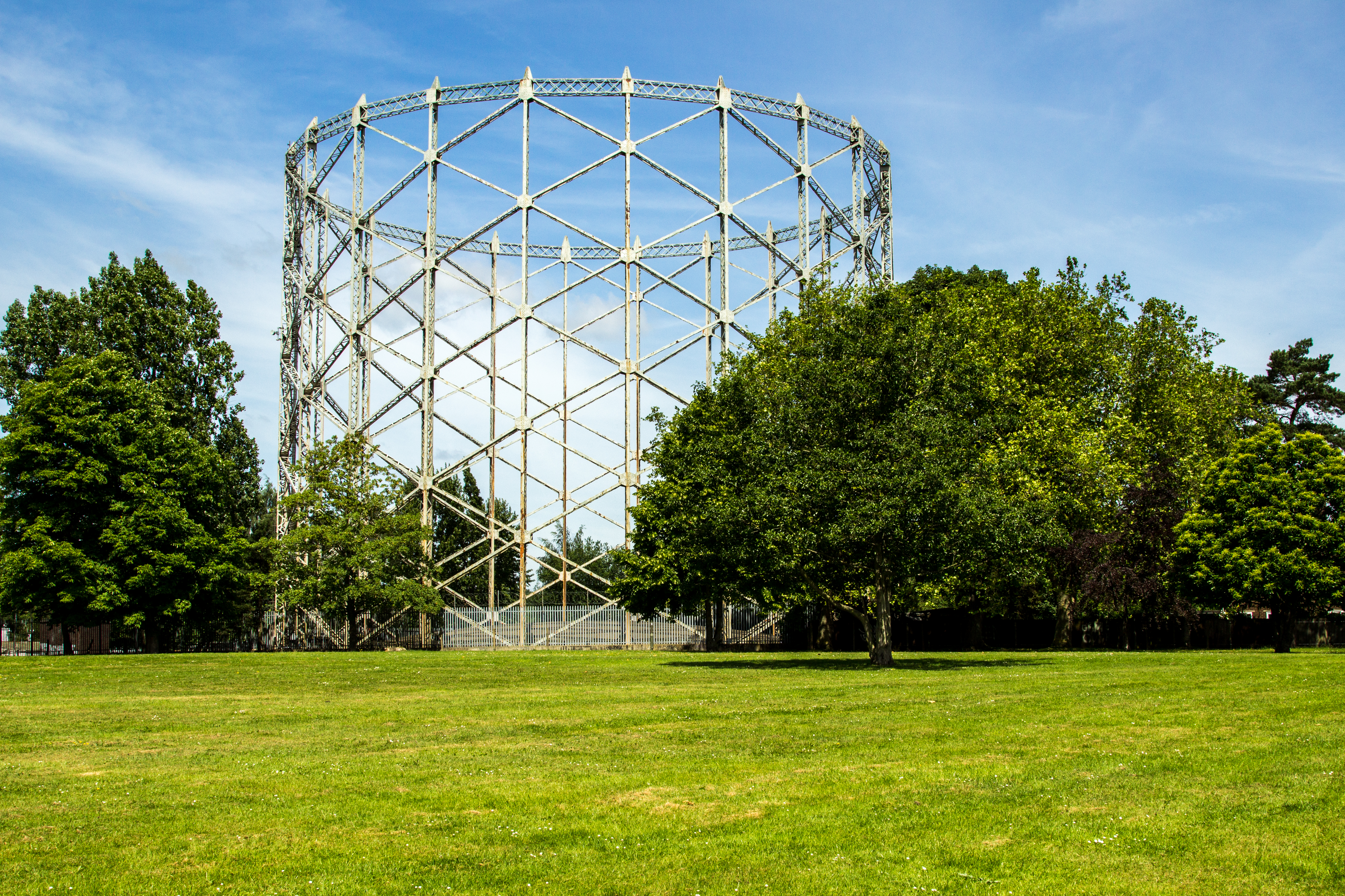
The disused Albert Road gas holder

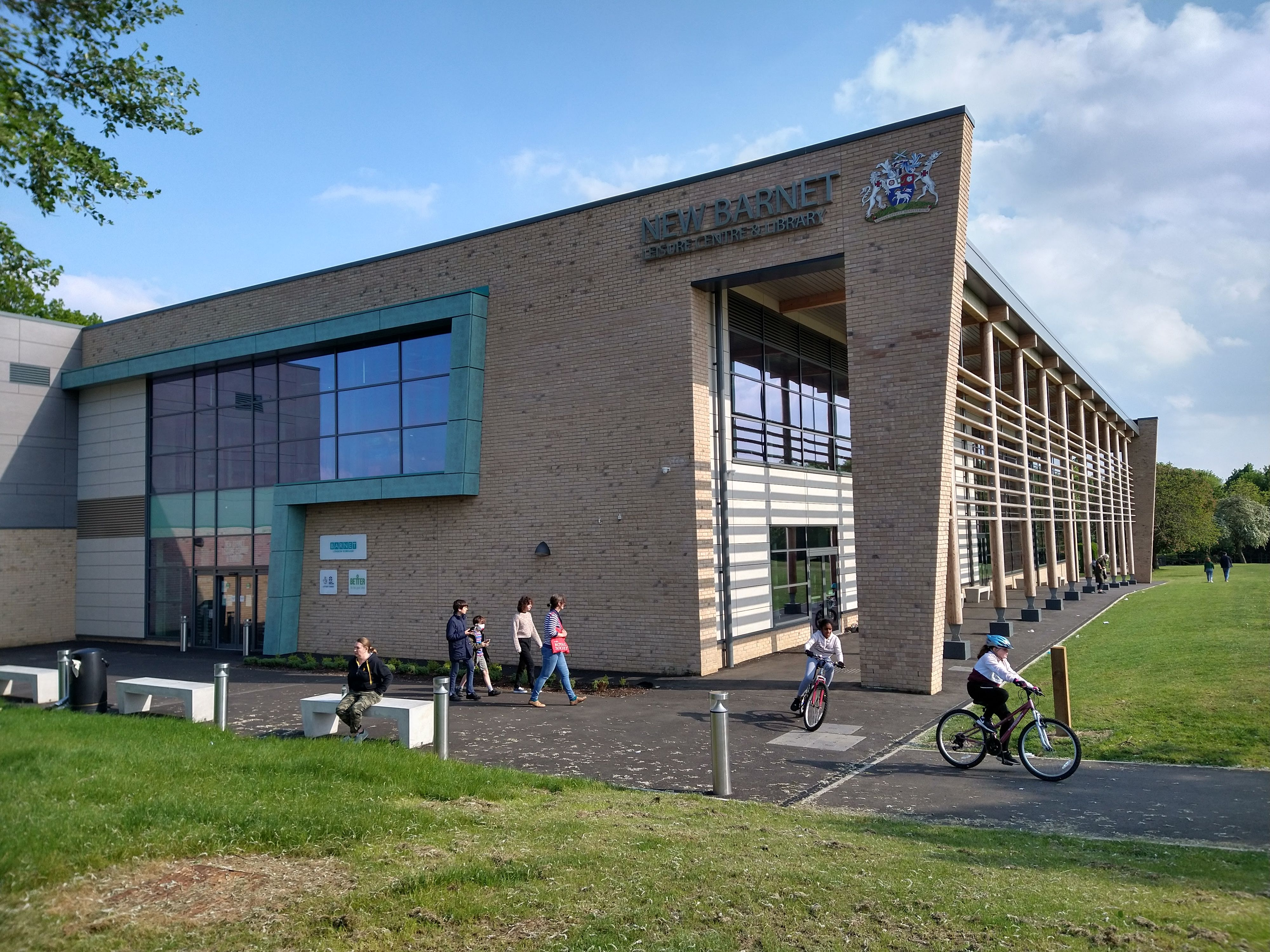
New Barnet Leisure Centre

New Barnet owes its conception to the building of the Great Northern Railway in 1850, when a station serving High Barnet was built, but located about a mile away from the town centre of High Barnet, so that this 'new' area quickly saw development:

In 1876, Handbook to the Environs of London by James Thorne describe New Barnet as one of those new half-finished railway villages that we have come to look on as almost a necessary adjunct of every station within a moderate distance of London.

New Barnet's growth accelerated at the turn of the 19th Century aided by the speculative developer, E. Fergusson Taylor, who became known as the creator of New Barnet.

In 1892 a town hall was built for the local board and from 1894 New Barnet formed part of the East Barnet Urban District of Hertfordshire until 1965 when it was transferred from Hertfordshire to Greater London to become part of the newly created London Borough of Barnet. The War Memorial was built opposite the Town Hall in 1921 to remember the 278 men of East Barnet who died in World War 1.

In 2019, a new leisure centre in New Barnet was completed by Barnet Council, including a 25m pool and gym. The leisure centre is run by the not-for-profit provider Better.

== Transport ==
=== Trains ===
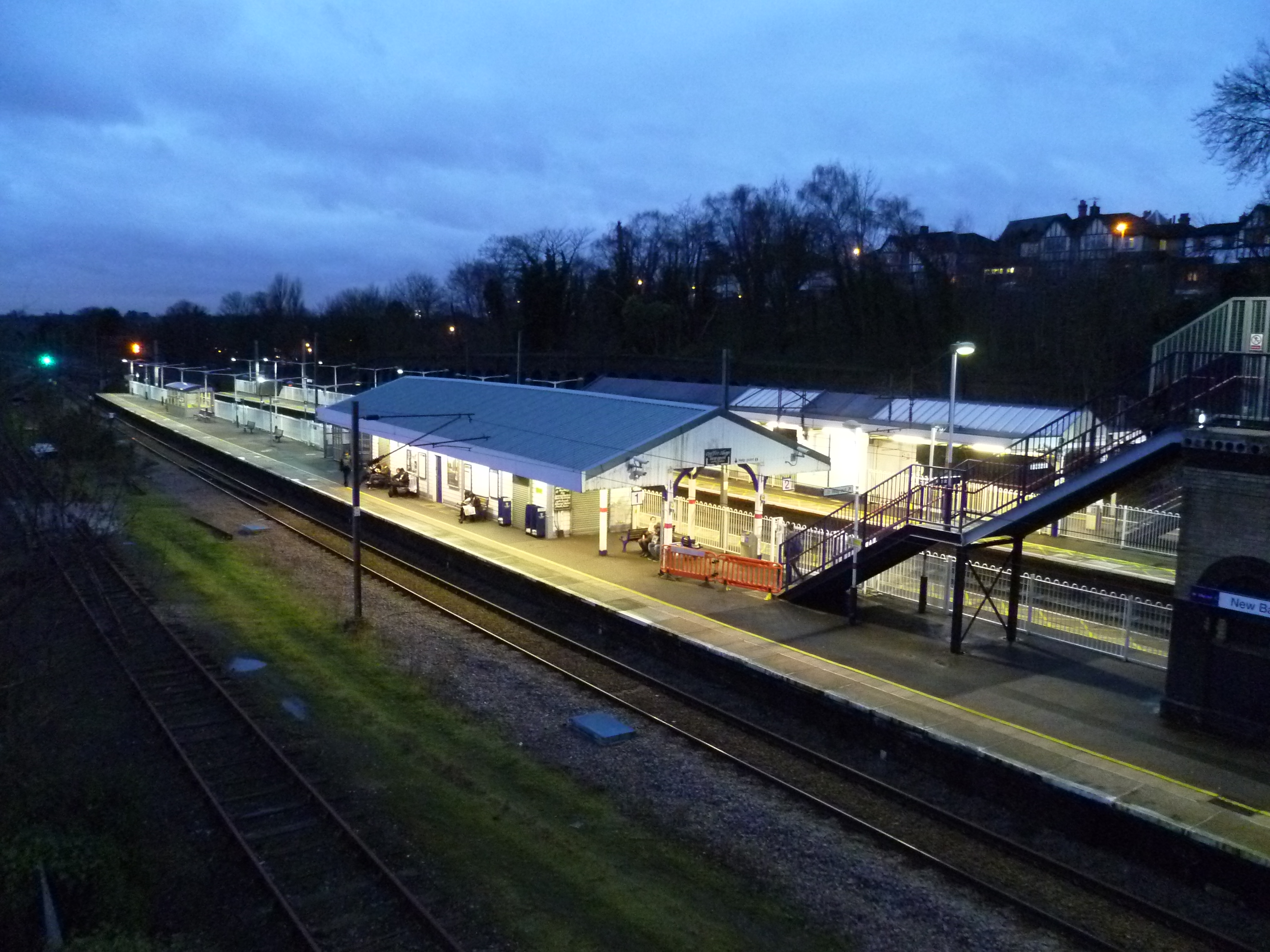
New Barnet railway station

The main rail station serving the area is New Barnet Station (Great Northern).

Regular trains run south into London Moorgate via Finsbury Park and north to Welwyn Garden City via Potters Bar.

The closest tube stations are High Barnet tube station to the west and Cockfosters tube station to the east.

=== Buses ===
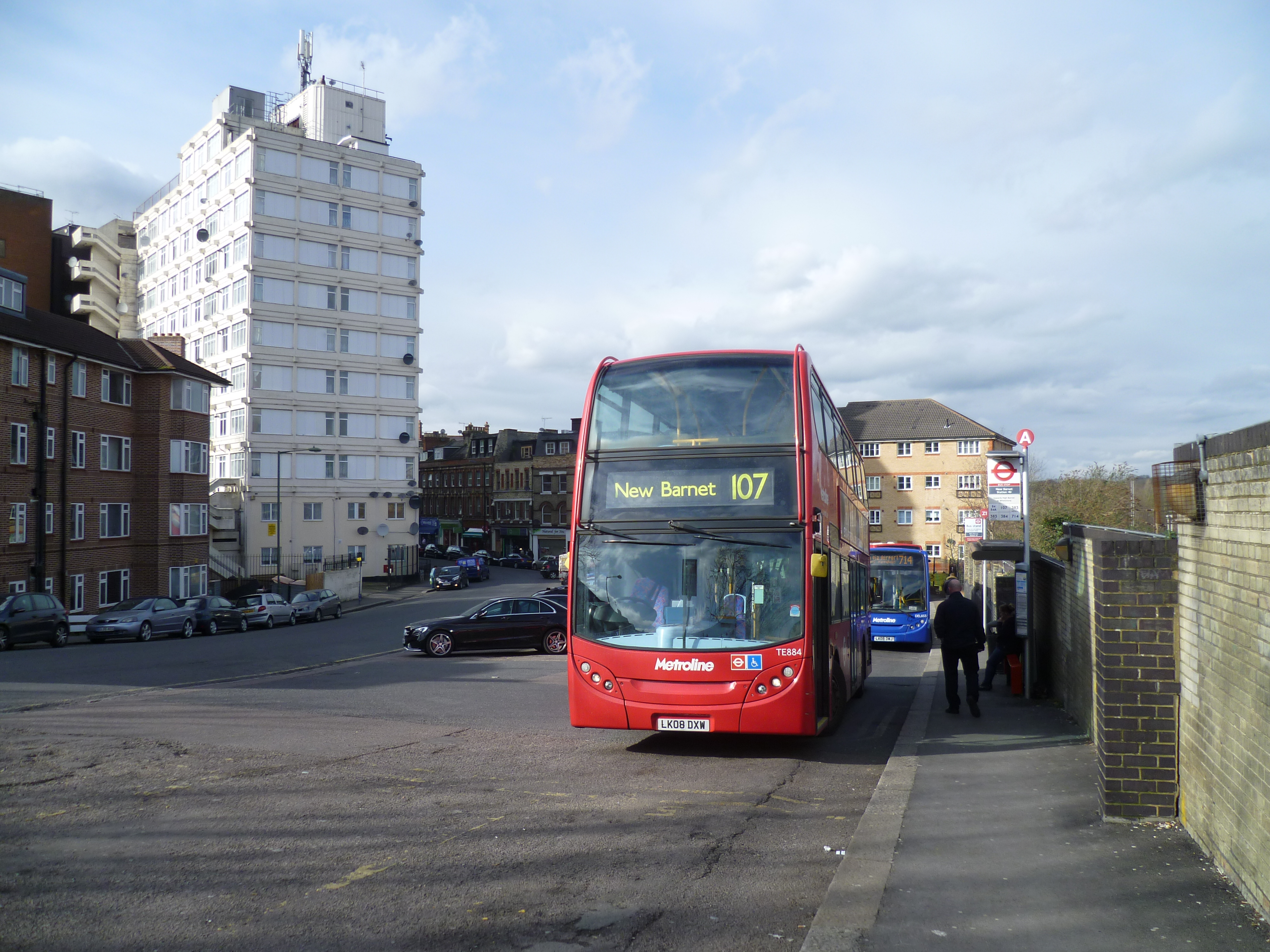
107 bus at New Barnet railway station with mid-20th century office developments near the station

Buses serving New Barnet are:

Route	Start	End	Operator
84 not a London bus route	New Barnet railway station	St Albans	Metroline
107	New Barnet railway station	Edgware	Metroline
184	Turnpike Lane Station	Chesterfield Road, Barnet	Arriva London
307	Barnet Hospital	Brimsdown	Arriva London
326	The Spires Shopping Centre, Barnet	Brent Cross	London Sovereign
383	The Spires Shopping Centre, Barnet	Woodside Park	Uno (bus company)
384	Edgware Tube Station	Cockfosters tube station	Metroline
714	New Barnet	Luton via Luton Airport	Metroline

== Places of worship ==
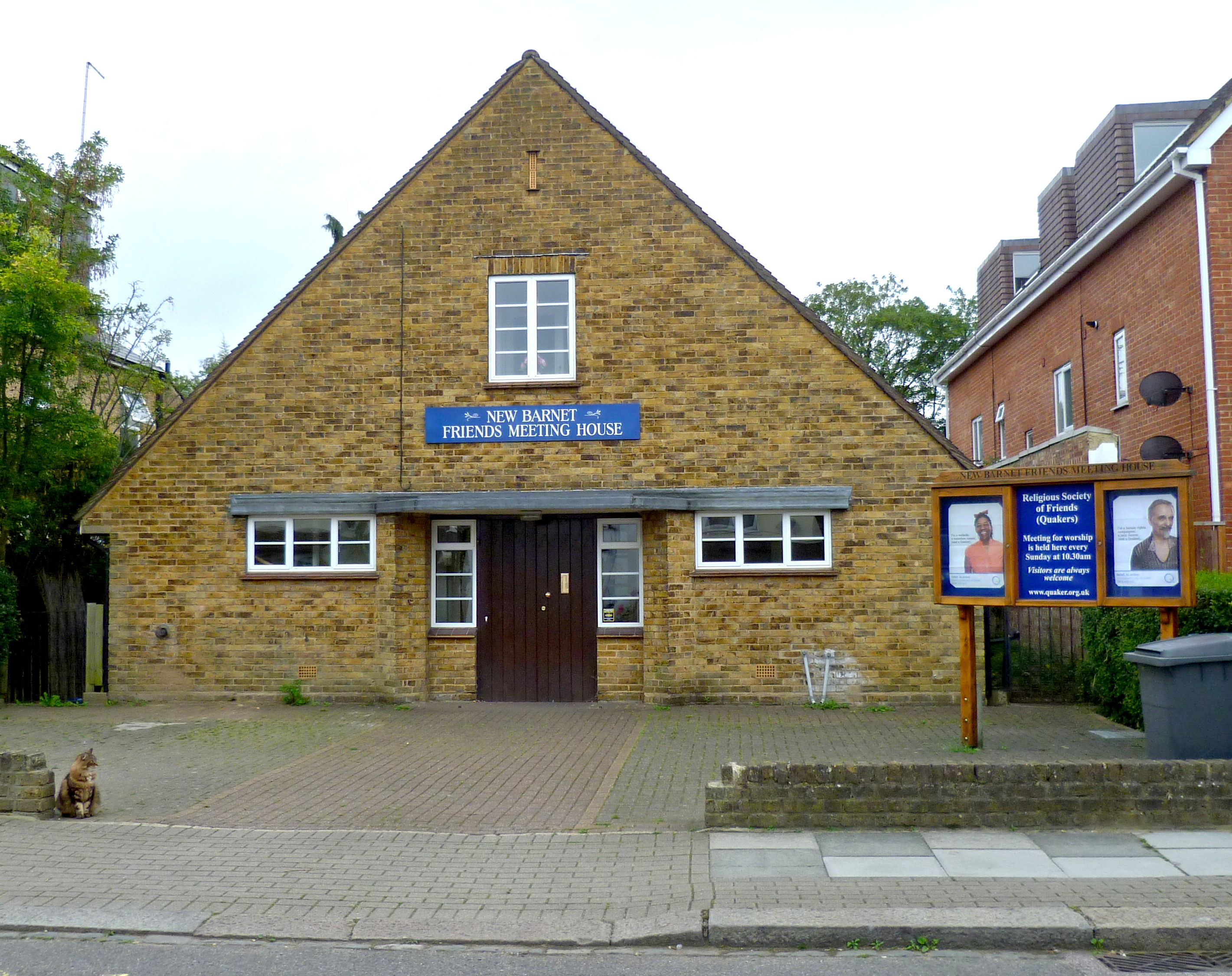
New Barnet Friends Meeting House, Leicester Road

Churches include the Anglican St James's (East Barnet Road), St Mark's (Potters Road), Holy Trinity (Corner of Lyonsdown and Somerset Roads); Catholic Mary Immaculate & St Peter (Somerset Road); United Reformed Church St John's (corner of Somerset and Mowbray Roads); Quaker Friends' Meeting (Leicester Road).

There is a United Synagogue on Eversleigh Road. Tibetan Yungdrung Bön Study Centre is a Buddhist Temple on Henry Road.

== Education ==
=== Nurseries and preschools ===
- Highview Montessori Nursery
- Play and Learn Day Nursery
- Twinkle Stars Montessori Nursery

=== Primary ===
- Livingstone School
- Cromer Road School
- Trent School
- Lyonsdown School (Private)

=== Secondary ===
- Jewish Community Secondary School (JCOSS)
- East Barnet School (EBS)

== Green spaces ==
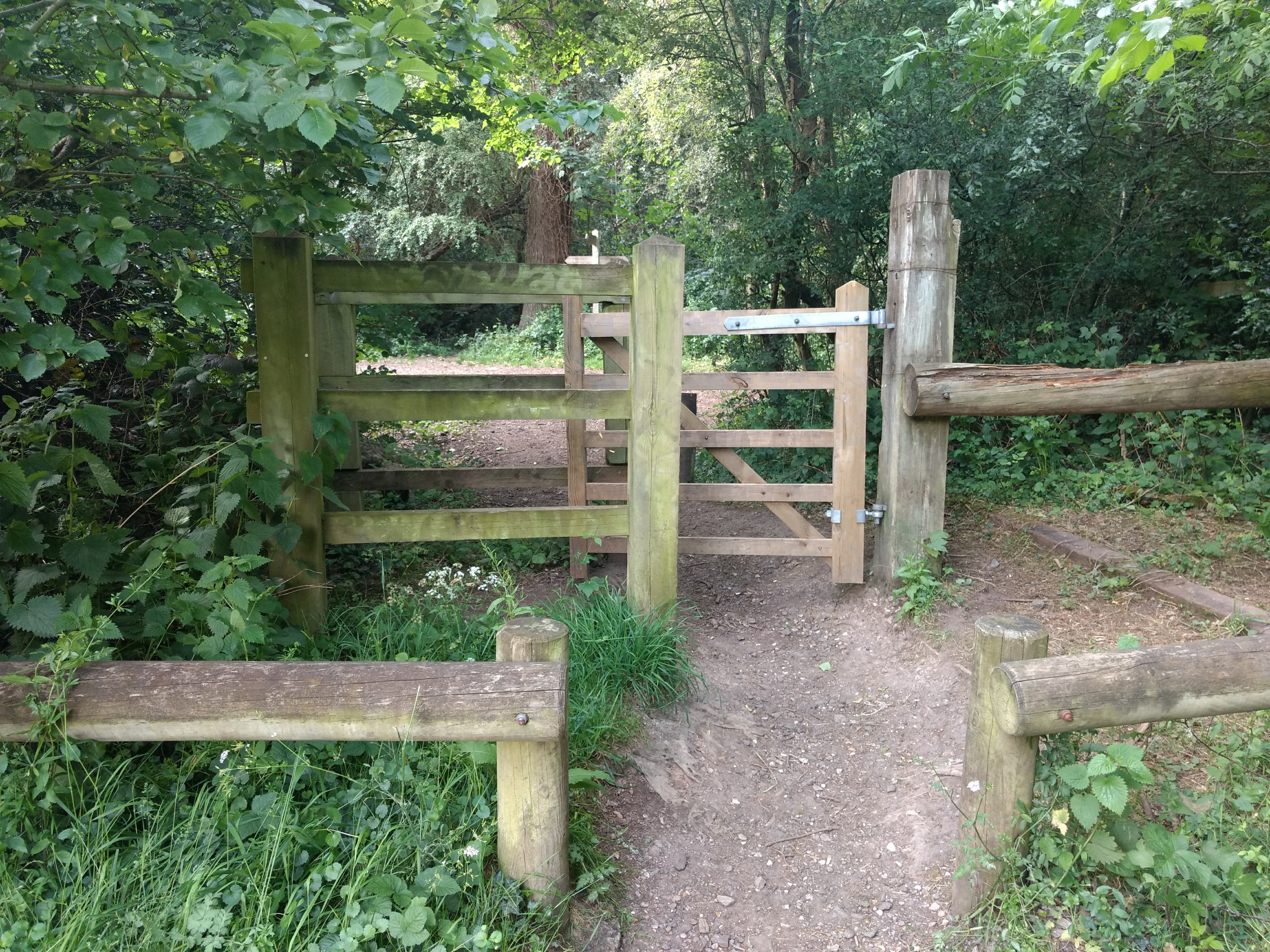
Entrance to Monken Hadley Common from Castlewood Road on the north edge of New Barnet

New Barnet is bounded by Monken Hadley Common to the North, which is largely a wooded area, with paths and a fishing lake (requiring a licence). King George's Field (Monken Hadley) bounds the West side of New Barnet and is one of many King George's Fields all over the country, established as memorials to King George V. Other Green Spaces include Victoria Recreation Ground, Highland Gardens and Ludgrove Playing Fields.

== Governance ==
Barnet local elections are held every four years to elect Councillors to Barnet London Borough Council. New Barnet is covered by three wards:

- East Barnet Ward
- High Barnet Ward
- Oakleigh Ward

New Barnet is in the Chipping Barnet (UK Parliament constituency) and is represented by the Labour Party (UK) MP Dan Tomlinson.

== Famous Residents ==
- William Ohly

== See also ==
- John Sebastian Marlowe Ward who founded a folk museum in Park Road.
- Abbey Arts Centre located on Park Road is a mix of artist living accommodation and work studios
