= List of accidents and incidents at London King's Cross railway station =

Since it opened in 1852, there have been a number of accidents at London King's Cross railway station. Accidents occurring at King's Cross St Pancras tube station are not covered.

== 1855 ==
On 18 January 1855, the axle of a North British Railway six-wheel carriage broke as the train was passing through Gasworks Tunnel. The cause found to be that the axle was made from defective materials. On 20 August 1855, a passenger train collided with the buffer stops at a speed of 3 miles per hour (4.8 km/h) due to driver error. Several passengers sustained slight injuries.

== 1860 ==
On 30 May 1860, an excursion train collided with the buffer stops. About fourteen people were injured. On 1 November 1860, the boiler of a locomotive exploded. The locomotive formerly belonged to the Eastern Counties Railway and had been named The Albion. It had been sold to a contractor and was being used in the construction of the Metropolitan Railway. The crown plate of the locomotive's firebox was found to be defective. Two people were killed, and three were injured, with one getting a serious injury.

== 1865 ==
On 2 November 1865, a coal train became divided at the station. The rear portion ran back and ran through the buffer stops. One person was injured.

== 1873 ==
On 30 October 1873, a passenger train stalled on leaving the station and ran back. The following passenger train collided with it. Several people were injured, one seriously.

== 1875 ==
On 22 March 1875, a passenger train was derailed entering Gasworks Tunnel. Some passengers were injured.

== 1878 ==
On 8 January 1878, a freight train became divided. The rear portion ran back and collided with a passenger train. Three people were severely injured.

== 1881 ==
On 9 April 1881, a passenger train collided with the rear of an empty stock train in Gasworks Tunnel. One person was injured.

On 15 September 1881, a light engine and a coal train collided near the mouth of Copenhagen Tunnel due to a signalman's error. One person was killed and one was severely injured.

== 1884 ==
On 8 November 1884, an empty stock train collided with a rake of carriages. One person was injured. The driver claimed brake failure as the cause.

== 1885 ==
On 30 June 1885, a freight train and a passenger train collided at the mouth of Gasworks Tunnel. No injuries were reported.

== 1893 ==
On 23 December 1893, a passenger train ran into an empty stock train on leaving the station due to a signalman's error. Two people were injured.

== 1896 ==
On 22 July 1896, a passenger train was derailed when leaving the station. One carriage overturned. Twenty people were injured; two people suffered broken arms.

== 1897 ==
On 10 March 1897, an excursion train collided with the buffer stops. Twelve people were injured.

== 1901 ==
On 28 December 1901, a passenger train and a freight train collided due to a signal displaying a false clear indication, having failed to return to danger when commanded. Five people were injured.

== 1932 ==
On 12 July 1932, a London and North Eastern Railway passenger train ran back in a tunnel and was derailed by catch points, fouling an adjacent line. A London, Midland and Scottish Railway freight train then collided with the derailed carriages and was also derailed. There were no injuries.

== 1945 ==
On 4 February 1945, a passenger train to Leeds and Bradford stalled in Gasworks Tunnel, ran back and was derailed in the station. Two people were killed and 25 were injured. Services were not fully restored to the station until 23 February.

== 2003 ==
On 16 September 2003, a passenger train was derailed due to a signalman's error, compounded by a maintenance error. There were no injuries.

== 2015 ==
On 17 September 2015, a passenger train collided with the buffer stops at platform 11 at a speed of 7.5 miles per hour (12.1 km/h). The train was operated by Class 317 electric multiple unit No. 317 346. Fourteen passengers were injured.

== 2017 ==
On 15 August 2017, a passenger train operated by a Class 387 electric multiple unit collided with the buffer stops on platform 9. Two passengers were injured.
