= Glasgow Queen Street rail accident =

Railway accident

Coordinates: 55.86434°N 4.25015°W

Glasgow Queen Street railway accident

Details
- Date: 12 October 1928; 21:52
- Location: Glasgow Queen Street railway station
- Country: Scotland
- Cause: Failure of signalman to comply with rules, inoperative sanding equipment

Statistics
- Trains: 2
- Deaths: 3
- Injured: 55

The Glasgow Queen Street railway accident occurred on 12 October 1928, in the tunnel adjacent to Glasgow Queen Street railway station on the Glasgow to Edinburgh line of the London & North Eastern Railway. A train climbing the steep 1 in 42–44 gradient through the tunnel slipped to a standstill and rolled back, colliding with an empty local train which was shunting. Three passengers were killed and 52 injured, and three train crew were also injured. Full details are in the Railway Inspectorate accident report; the investigation was carried out by Colonel A.C. Trench.

== Description ==
The 21:45 express train from Glasgow to Edinburgh consisted of a Class D11 "Director" 4-4-0 engine No. 6382 "Colonel Gardiner" and five bogie coaches, which was close to the load limit for a single engine without banking assistance. The rails were greasy and the engine was slipping from the outset. The train proceeded 600 yards (550 m) into the tunnel but then began to slip backwards, as shown by skid marks observed afterwards on the rails. The driver did not realise that he was now slipping backwards as the tunnel was pitch dark and full of smoke and steam. There were lights on the tunnel wall but they would not have been visible.

The railway company had anticipated this possibility on the very steep incline, and had a rule that the track should be left clear behind unassisted trains until an indicator showed that they had reached the top end of the tunnel. Hence the sliding back of the train, though alarming, would not have been dangerous as it would have stopped on reaching the level ground in the station. However, the signalman had allowed an empty local train to Alloa to move forward into the tunnel in order to reverse into its correct platform. This was required by the very confined layout of the station, but was against the rules when the express train had not exited from the tunnel. Hence the engine of the local train collided with the rear of the express, and the last three coaches of the express were severely damaged.

The driver of No. 6382 had been using the steam sanding apparatus throughout and had checked it earlier, noting that the right-hand sander was working well but the left-hand sander was only partly effective. However, when tested after the accident, the right-hand sander was found not to be working as its steam supply line had broken without warning. The resulting loss of adhesion would have made the difference between net forward movement and net backward movement.

Col. Trench placed the main blame for the accident on the signalman for not following the rule designed to give a safeguard in precisely this situation. The driver could not easily tell that he had begun to slip backwards or that the sander had failed, and the flaw in the steam sander pipe could not have been detected prior to failure. The signalman was charged with culpable homicide (manslaughter) but was acquitted as his actions were not gross negligence.

Tragically, one of the dead was a young man who had been married only three hours earlier. His bride had a leg amputated.

== Related accidents ==
A very similar accident occurred at London Kings Cross in 1945, where the gradient was less steep but the load heavier.

Other collisions took place at the bottom of the steeply graded tunnel in 1951 and 1977. In both cases the cause was brake failure on "light engines" (unattached to a train) descending the incline.

A more spectacular accident occurred on Saturday 12 August 1911 when the 1.5 pm express from Edinburgh failed to stop; the engine demolished the buffer stops, carved through the concrete circulating area (narrowly missing the Lord Provost) and just penetrated the refreshment room wall before coming to rest. Shouted staff warnings allowed people on the concourse to move out of the way in time ("the crowds ... parted like the waters of the Red Sea"), nobody was killed and only 7 people slightly injured. The driver, running late with a heavy train, was found to have descended Cowlairs incline too fast. It was a lucky escape compared to the similar but fatal collision at Glasgow St Enoch in 1903.
