= Copenhagen Tunnel =

Railway tunnel in London, United Kingdom

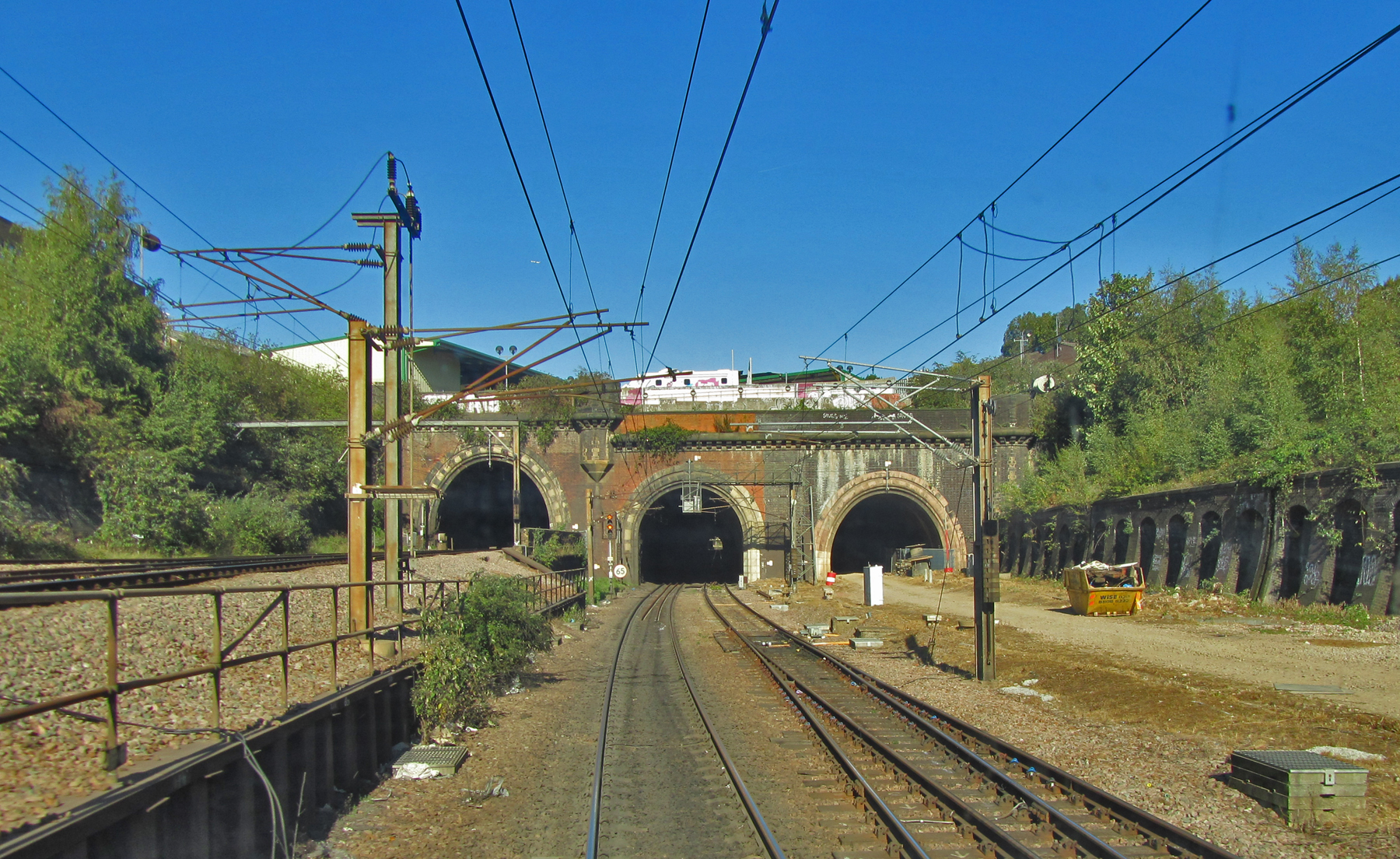
- Copenhagen Tunnel southern portals
- Interactive map of Copenhagen Tunnel

Overview
- Line: East Coast Main Line
- Location: Barnsbury
- Coordinates: 51.5457°N 0.1206°W
- OS grid reference: TQ 30404 84602
- Status: Original bore: operational; Second bore: operational; Third bore: road access
- System: National Rail
- Start: Original bore: 1850; Second bore: 1877; Third bore: 1886

Operation
- Owner: Network Rail
- Operator: See East Coast Main Line § Operators

Technical
- Design engineer: Thomas Brassey
- Length: 594 yd (543 m)
- No. of tracks: 4 (6 until 1977)
- Track gauge: 1,435 mm (4 ft 8 1/2 in)
- Electrified: 25 kV 50 Hz AC

The Copenhagen Tunnel is a railway tunnel in London, United Kingdom, that is situated approximately 0.8 mi (1.3 km) down the East Coast Main Line from London King's Cross railway station. It comprises three twin-track bores, of which only the central and western have been in use since the remodelling of King's Cross in 1977. Passenger trains travel through the slow lines in the western bore at 40 mph (64 km/h) and through the fast lines in the central bore at 60 mph (97 km/h); this speed limit is reduced for other train categories.

The tunnel was situated at the end of Thomas Brassey's contract to build the Great Northern Railway between London and Peterborough. It originally comprised only one bore but a second was added in 1877 and a third in 1886. The western bore is elevated above the others to allow the Holloway Flyover to begin immediately after the northern portals, which converts the four tracks into being quadrupled by direction instead of speed heading northbound.

== Design ==
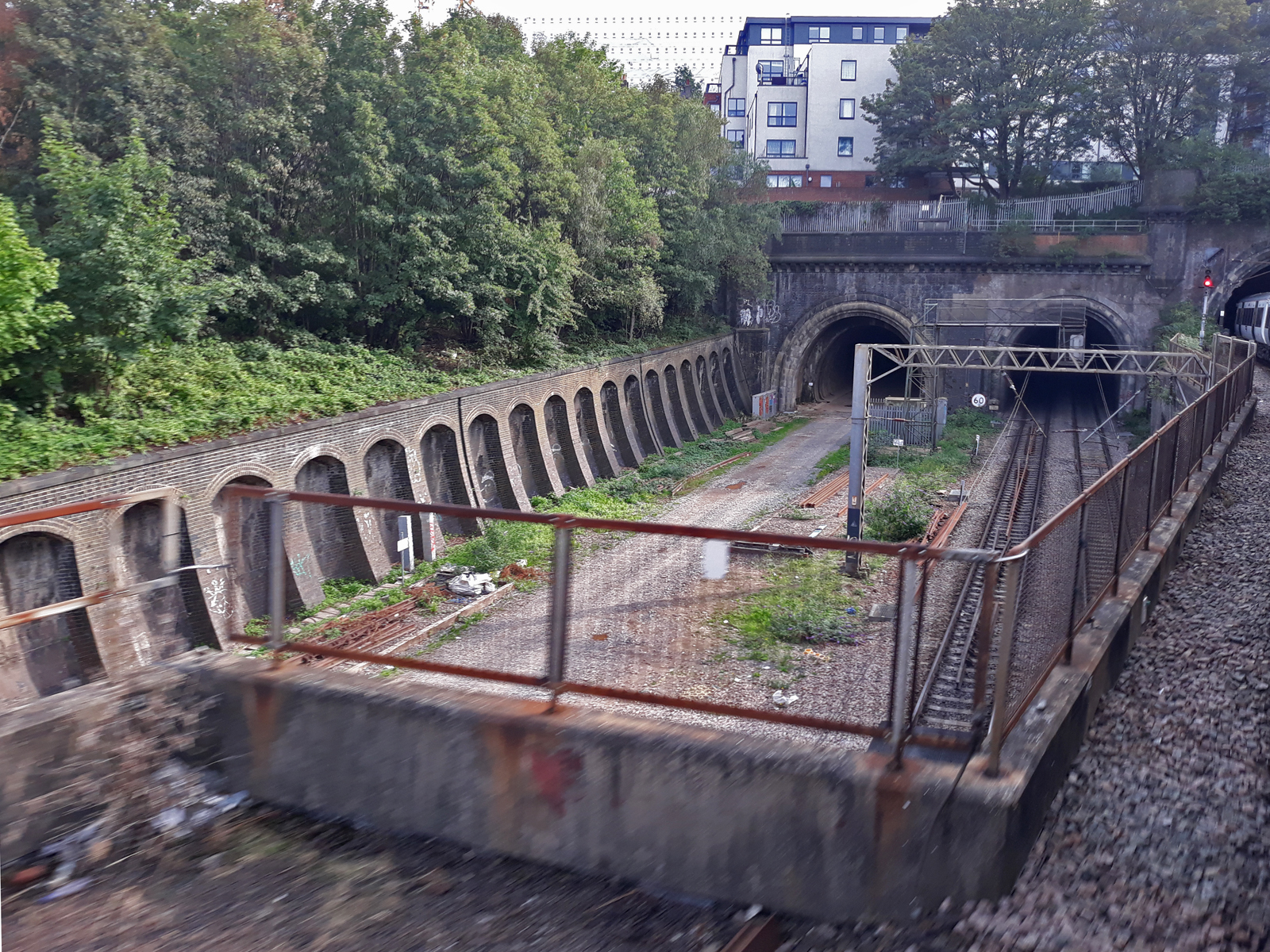
The Up Slow flyover at Holloway Junction, showing the western bore elevated above the central and eastern bores

The tunnel consists of two operational parallel bores, officially named the Centre Bore, which carries the fast lines, and the West Bore, which carries the slow lines. Both bores are 594 yards (543 m) in length and are situated 0 miles 65 chains (0.81 miles, 1.31 km) to 1 mile 12 chains (1.15 miles, 1.85 km) from London King's Cross railway station, from which mileage on the East Coast Main Line is measured.

The speed limit in the western bore is 40 mph (64 km/h) on both lines for passenger and empty stock trains; it is only 25 mph (40 km/h) for other trains in the down direction. The speed limit in the central bore is 60 mph (97 km/h) on both lines for passenger and empty stock trains; it is only 35 mph (56 km/h) for other trains in the up direction. The tunnel has a steep ascending gradient of 1 in 110 (0.91%), which historically led to operation complexities.

Both tunnels contain a facing point, with a speed limit of 60 mph (97 km/h) in the central bore and 40 mph (64 km/h) in the western bore. The point in the western bore must be used by trains to allow bidirectional access to the chord that connects the East Coast Main Line to the North London Incline, which allows access to the North London line and the High Speed 1 section of St Pancras railway station. The tunnel, along with the other eight between King's Cross and Peterborough, is perfectly straight, unlike most of the line. This is because curved tunnels were not possible with the technology of the time.

At its northern end the tunnel is immediately preceded by Holloway Junction, which is where the line transitions from being quadrupled by direction to quadrupled by speed by means of the Up Slow line being carried on a flyover over the two fast lines (see photo). After this, the railway begins to ascend at a rate of 1 in 200 (0.5%) until Potters Bar railway station. The next tunnel up the line is the Gasworks Tunnel and the next tunnel down the line is the Wood Green Tunnel.

== History ==
=== Construction and opening ===
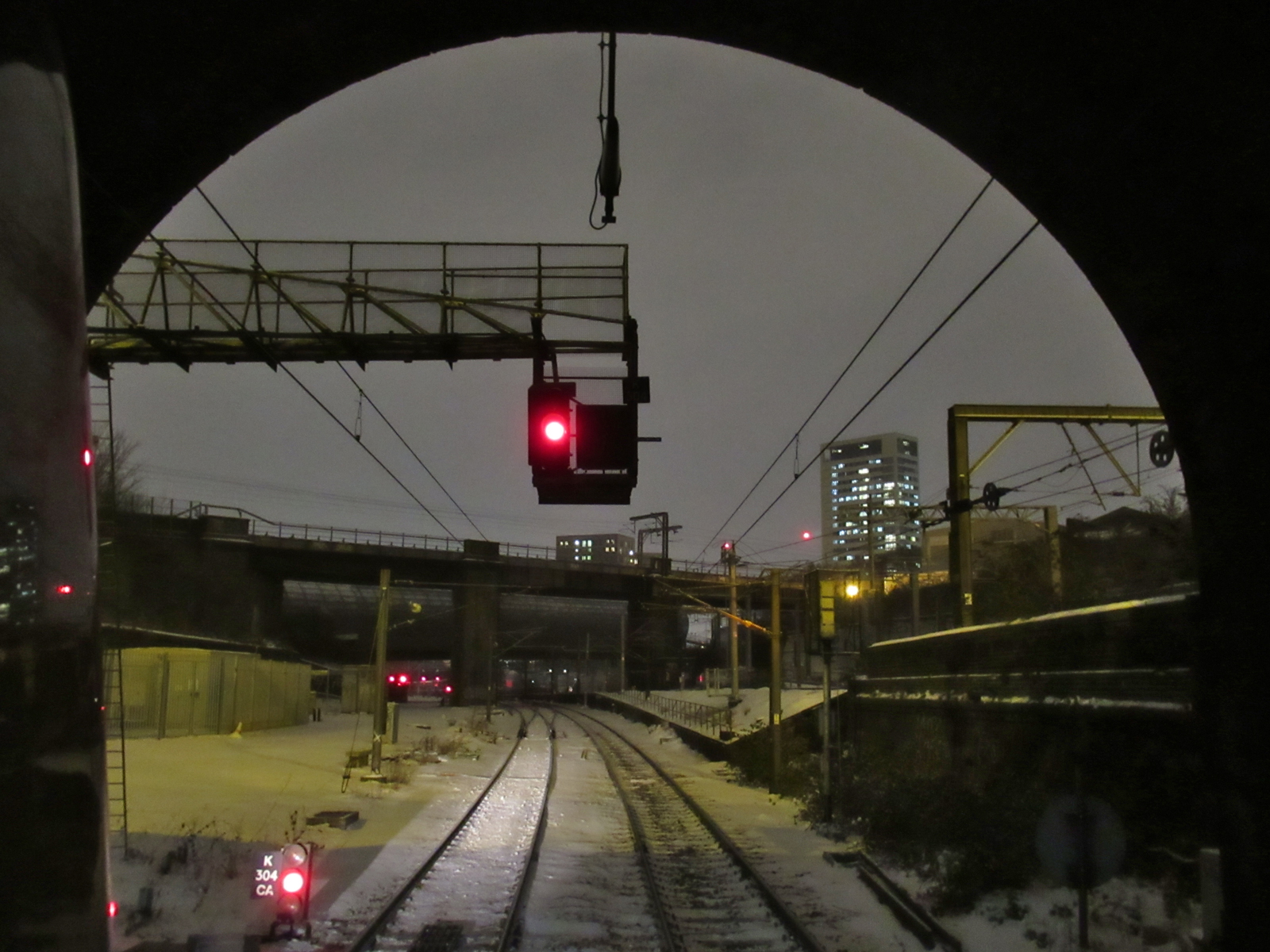
View out of the southern portal of the tunnel, with the North London line on the overbridge

The Copenhagen Tunnel was the last section of the line into London to have its contract issued. To the north was Thomas Brassey's contract, and to the south was the mile-long section towards the then-planned London King's Cross railway station; John Jay was awarded the contract for the temporary terminus at Maiden Lane and the tracks betwen it and the tunnel. The contract for the tunnel was issued to Pearce and Smith, who had begun work by December 1849.

The name for the tunnel was taken from the Copenhagen Fields, which were the gardens of the Danish Ambassador in the 17th century; it is the only one of the nine tunnels on the original GNR line into London to retain its planned name. The fields are notable for being the site of frequent protesting, including against the conviction of the Tolpuddle Martyrs, with the government forced to release them.

Pearce and Smith made the bricks on site using the spoil from digging the tunnel bore, by means of innovative techniques that were new in London at the time. Their first attempt involved using the clay but not any ash, which led to hard but brittle bricks that cracked in the kiln. Their improved method involved processing the clay immediately after it was dug out, before combining it with ash, and slop-moulding it into shape. The kilns that the bricks were burnt in were coal-fuelled and exposed, which led the bricks to have an unusually red colour but did not affect their efficacy. To save money, Pearce and Smith also sometimes used sawdust rather than sand which was supplied by a sawmill. They also used a single steam engine to power the mortar mill, lifts in the tunnel shafts, and the sawmill.

=== 19th century ===
The tunnel was immediately to the north, and part of, the complicated and vast King's Cross Goods Yard and similar surrounding yards which also served the London, Midland and Scottish Railway out of St Pancras and the North London line. Copenhagen Junction and Goods and Mineral Junction were situated just to the south of the tunnel. Much of this infrastructure was not actually visible to passenger trains on the main line, and it required the cooperation of multiple closely-packed signal boxes on both sides of the tunnel. The Metropolitan Cattle Market and its abattoir were situated to the west of the main line and served by their own sidings which were accessed by the goods lines. There were also both the Islington Electric Light Works and the Star Brush Works nearby.

This area also held the former Great Northern Cemetery Station which was used to transport coffins from London to New Southgate Cemetery for burial. There was an additional spur that ran perpendicular to the main line and then over the top of the Copenhagen Tunnel to serve the Caledonian Road coal yard, which closed in October 1967. This ran parallel to the North London line, which passes over the ECML just to the south of the southern tunnel bores.

The lines between the westernmost bore of the Gasworks Tunnel and Copenhagen Tunnel, which are now the Down Slow and Up Slow lines, were formerly the main access lines for the King's Cross Goods Yard and the South London Goods lines. The Holloway Flyover was originally designed to carry the Up Goods into the goods yard, but is now used to carry the Up Slow line into London King's Cross and the canal tunnels.

=== 20th century ===
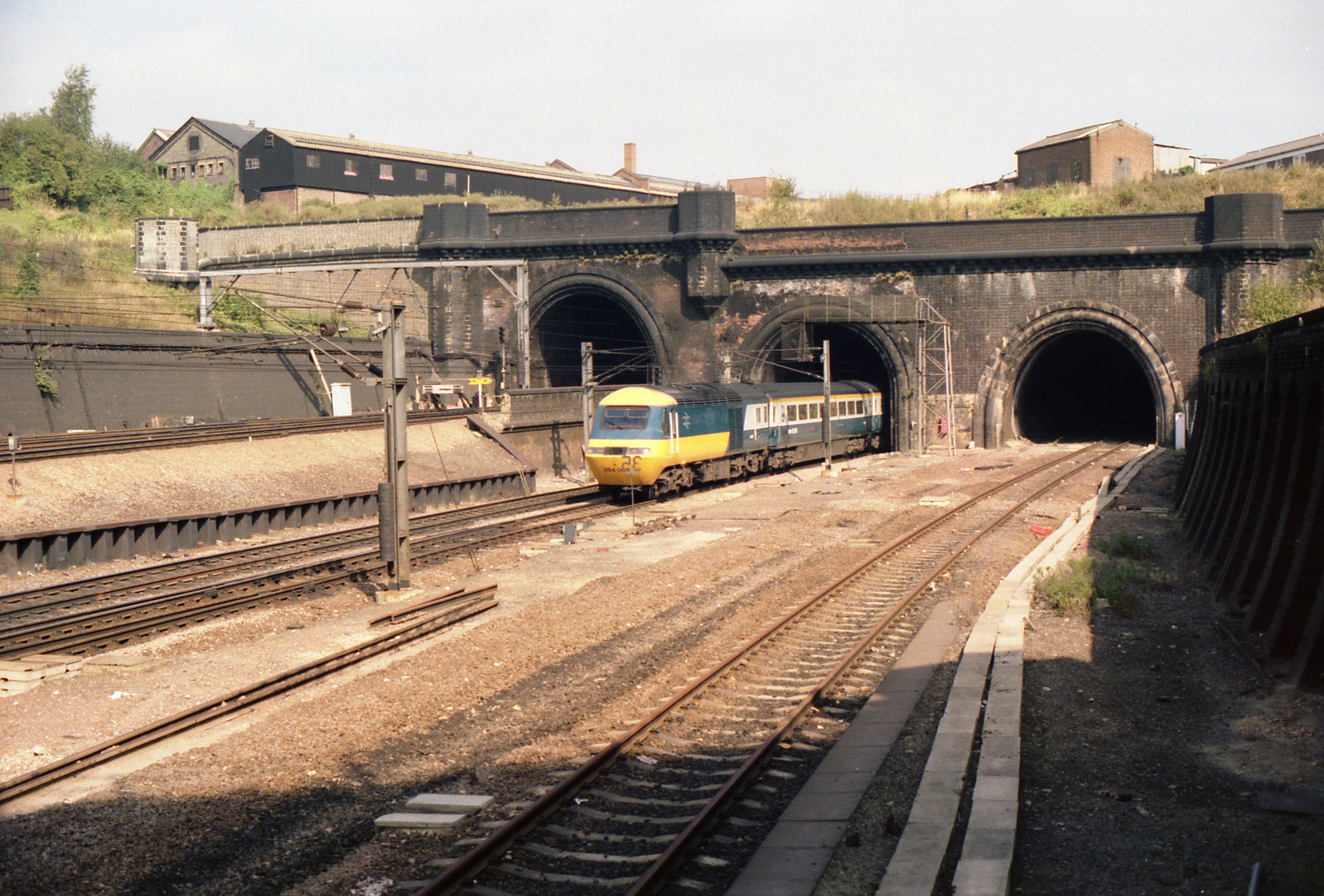
An InterCity 125 exits the tunnel during rationalisation (c. 1978).

It was at Copenhagen Tunnel where passenger services from King's Cross via the Gasworks Tunnel met goods trains and coal trains from expansive depots situated north of the Regent's Canal. The western tracks north of the tunnel also had a former connection to the lines serving King's Cross Goods Yard, which connected at Goods and Mineral Junction and its corresponding signal box. The two lines in the Western bore were formerly named the Up Goods and Down Goods for this reason, and also because all three bores were still in situ.

The original tunnel is now the middle of three parallel bores. A second tunnel to the west was built in 1877 and a third one to the east in 1886. The western bore carried up and down goods traffic, the central one was used for down passenger traffic and the eastern bore was used for up passenger traffic. Following electrification in the 1970s, the layout was remodelled. This was helped by the fact that King's Cross Goods Yard and Top Shed had closed, so it was possible to remove the goods lines. The eastern tunnel was taken out of railway service but maintained to ensure the integrity of the ground overhead – it provides road vehicle access to Holloway Bank.

The 1955 British comedy film The Ladykillers is set in the area around King's Cross and St Pancras railway stations and their old goods yards. One of the sets for the house of the protagonist, Mrs Wilberforce, was built perpendicular to the end of Frederica Street, which sat close to the south portal of the Copenhagen Tunnel. Immediately to the south of the set was the spur which carried a track above the tunnel to the goods and coal yard. In one scene from the film the characters dump others' dead bodies over the south portal of the tunnel onto the tracks below. None of Frederica Street, the set, the coal and goods yard, and the spur of track survive today.

=== 21st century ===
On 15 October 2006, a worker lost control of a road–rail vehicle near London King's Cross and it ran away for 1,600 feet (490 m), coming to a stop 100 feet (30 m) into the tunnel. The gradient on the relevant section of track was 1 in 55 (18.2‰) and this meant that the vehicle had no effective ability to brake on the rails. The incident was attributed primarily, however, to human error, and the Rail Accident Investigation Branch decided not to pursue a full investigation as the contractor was already working on improving training.

In January 2024, the Copenhagen Tunnel and the neighbouring Gasworks Tunnel became the first in the country to have new signal-boosting technology fitted inside. This stops devices from losing signal and allows passengers to continue calls while travelling through the tunnels. The upgrade was funded entirely by London North Eastern Railway. As of March 2026, the operators passing through the Copenhagen Tunnel include Grand Central, Great Northern and Thameslink, Hull Trains, London North Eastern Railway, and Lumo.

== See also ==
- Barnet Tunnel
- Canal Tunnels
- Gasworks Tunnel
- Infrastructure of the East Coast Main Line
