= London King's Cross railway station =

Railway station in London

King's Cross
- London King's Cross
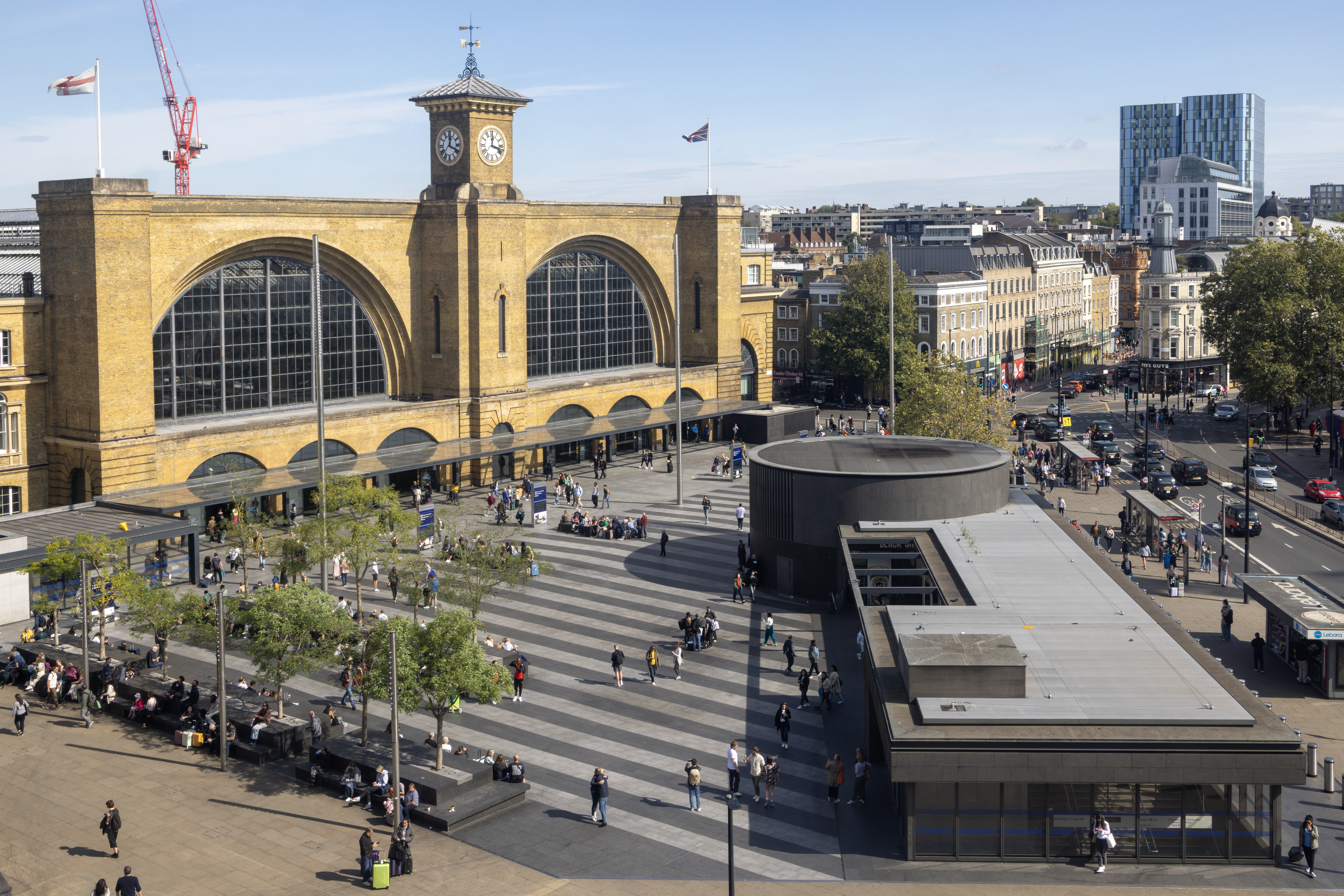
- King's Cross station frontage and King's Cross Square
- Interactive map of King's Cross

General information
- Location: King's Cross
- Local authority: London Borough of Camden
- Managed by: Network Rail
- Owner: Network Rail
- Station codes: KGX, QQK (IATA)
- DfT category: A
- Number of platforms: 11 (numbered 0–10)
- Accessible: Yes
- Fare zone: 1
- OSI: King's Cross St Pancras; London St Pancras; London Euston
- Cycle parking: Yes – platforms 0 & 1, 8, 9 and car park racks
- Toilet facilities: Yes

National Rail annual entry and exit
- 2020–21: ▼4.668 million
- Interchange: ▼0.430 million
- 2021–22: ▲20.476 million
- Interchange: ▲1.422 million
- 2022–23: ▲23.287 million
- Interchange: ▲1.694 million
- 2023–24: ▲24.484 million
- Interchange: ▲1.754 million
- 2024–25: ▲27.727 million
- Interchange: ▼1.553 million

Railway companies
- Original company: Great Northern Railway
- Pre-grouping: Great Northern Railway
- Post-grouping: London and North Eastern Railway

Key dates
- 14 October 1852: Opened

Other information
- External links: Departures; Facilities
- Coordinates: 51.5310°N 0.1233°W

King's Cross railway station, also known as London King's Cross, is a passenger railway terminus in the London Borough of Camden, on the edge of Central London. It is one of the busiest stations in the United Kingdom and the southern terminus of the East Coast Main Line to Yorkshire and the Humber, North East England and Scotland. Adjacent to King's Cross station is St Pancras International, the London terminus for Eurostar services to continental Europe as well as other national lines. Beneath both main line stations is King's Cross St Pancras tube station on the London Underground; combined, they form one of the country's largest and busiest transport hubs.

The station was opened in King's Cross in 1852 by the Great Northern Railway on the northern edge of Central London to accommodate the East Coast Main Line. It quickly grew to cater to suburban lines and was expanded several times in the 19th century. As part of the Big Four grouping in 1923, it came under the ownership of the London and North Eastern Railway, who introduced famous services such as the Flying Scotsman and locomotives such as Mallard. The station complex was redeveloped in the 1970s, simplifying the layout and providing electric suburban services, and it became a major terminus for the high-speed InterCity 125. As of 2026, long-distance trains from King's Cross are run primarily by London North Eastern Railway to Edinburgh Waverley, Leeds and Newcastle; the other long-distance operators are Hull Trains, Grand Central, and Lumo. In addition, Greater Thameslink Railway operates regional commuter services from the station to North London, Hertfordshire, Bedfordshire,Cambridgeshire, and Norfolk.

In the late 20th century, the area around the station became known for its seedy and downmarket character, and was used as a setting for many films. A major redevelopment was undertaken in the 21st century, including restoration of the original roof, addition of a new booking hall, and the creation of King's Cross Central on the site of the station's former goods yards. The station has also become well known for its association with the Harry Potter franchise, particularly the fictional Platform Nine and Three-Quarters.

== Location and name ==
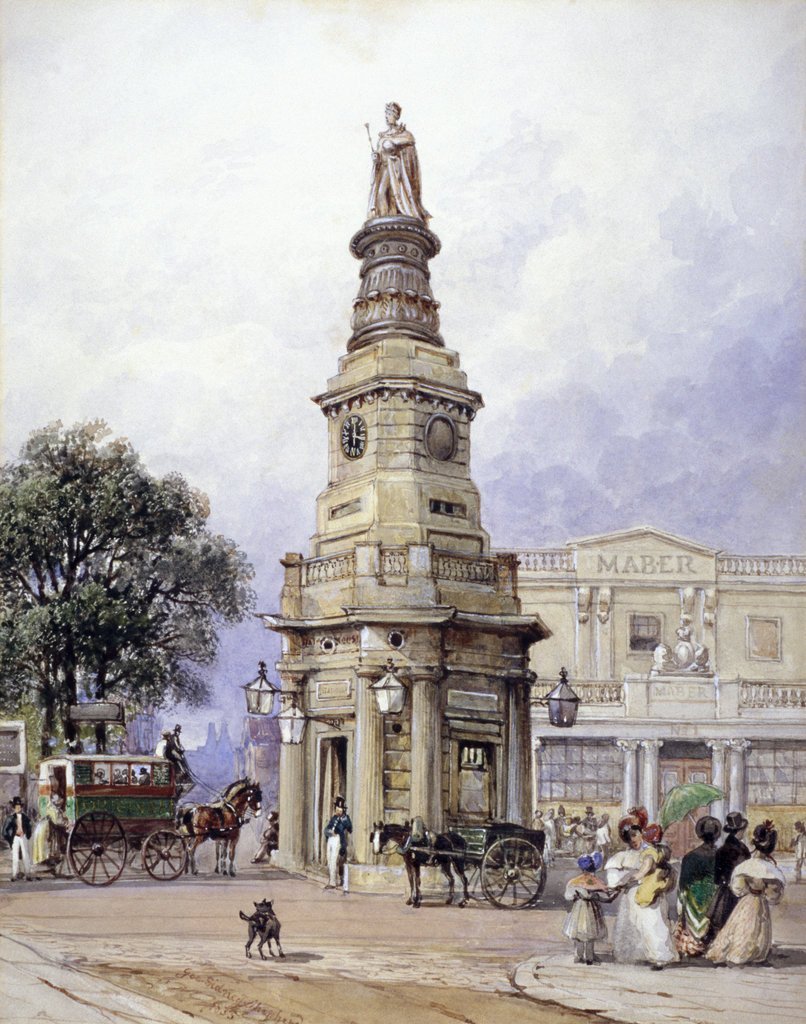
The 'King's Cross' after which the station is named

The station stands on the London Inner Ring Road at the eastern end of Euston Road, next to the junction with Pentonville Road, Gray's Inn Road, Caledonian Road, King's Cross Road, and York Way. It is situated in the London Borough of Camden. The eastern side of the station along York Way runs directly on the boundary with the neighbouring London Borough of Islington. Immediately to the west, on the other side of Pancras Road, is St Pancras railway station. Several London bus routes, including 30, 59, 73, 91, 205, 390 and 476 pass in front of or to the side of the station.

The area of King's Cross was previously a village known as Battle Bridge which was an ancient crossing of the River Fleet, originally known as Broad Ford, later Bradford Bridge. The river flowed along what is now the west side of Pancras Road until it was rerouted underground in 1825. The name "Battle Bridge" is linked to tradition that this was the site of a major battle between the Romans and the Celtic British Iceni tribe led by Boudica. According to folklore, King's Cross is the site of Boudica's final battle and some sources say she is buried under one of the platforms. Platforms 9 and 10 have been suggested as possible sites. Boudica's ghost is also reported to haunt passages under the station, around platforms 8–10.

The station took its name from the King's Cross building, a monument to King George IV that stood in the area and was demolished in 1845. King's Cross can be spelled both with and without an apostrophe. King's Cross is used in signage at the Network Rail and London Underground stations, on the Tube map and on the official Network Rail webpage. Kings Cross is used on the National Rail website. The apostrophe rarely featured on early Underground maps, but has been consistently used on them since 1951. Shortened names for 'King's Cross' include King's X, Kings X, KX, and KGX, the latter of which also serves as the National Rail station code.

== History ==
=== Great Northern Railway (1850–1923) ===
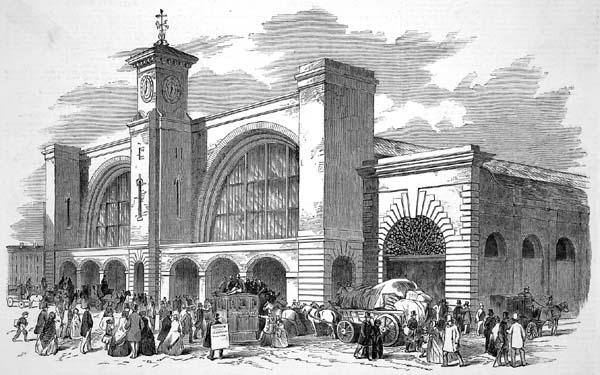
King's Cross in 1852

King's Cross station was built in 1851–52 as the London terminus of the Great Northern Railway (GNR), and was the fifth London terminal to be constructed. It replaced a temporary station next to Maiden Lane (now York Way) that had been quickly constructed with the line's arrival in London in 1850, and had opened on 7 August 1850.

Plans for the station were made in December 1848 under the direction of George Turnbull, resident engineer for constructing the first 20 miles (32 km) of the Great Northern Railway out of London. The station's detailed design was by Lewis Cubitt, the brother of Thomas Cubitt (the architect of Bloomsbury, Belgravia and Osborne House), and Sir William Cubitt (who was chief engineer of the Crystal Palace built in 1851, and consulting engineer to the GNR and South Eastern Railway). The design comprised two great arched train sheds, with a brick structure at the south end designed to reflect the arches behind. Its main feature was a 112-foot (34 m) high clock tower that held treble, tenor and bass bells, the last of these weighing 1 ton 9 cwt (1.47 tonnes). In size, it was inspired by the 200 yards (180 m) long Moscow Riding Academy of 1825, leading to its built length of 268 yards (245 m). (Note: Lewis Cubitt was also responsible for the design of the Great Northern Hotel (see below).) A turret clock exhibited by E. J. Dent & Co. at the Great Exhibition of 1851 (awarded a Council Medal) was later associated with the station’s timekeeping arrangements.

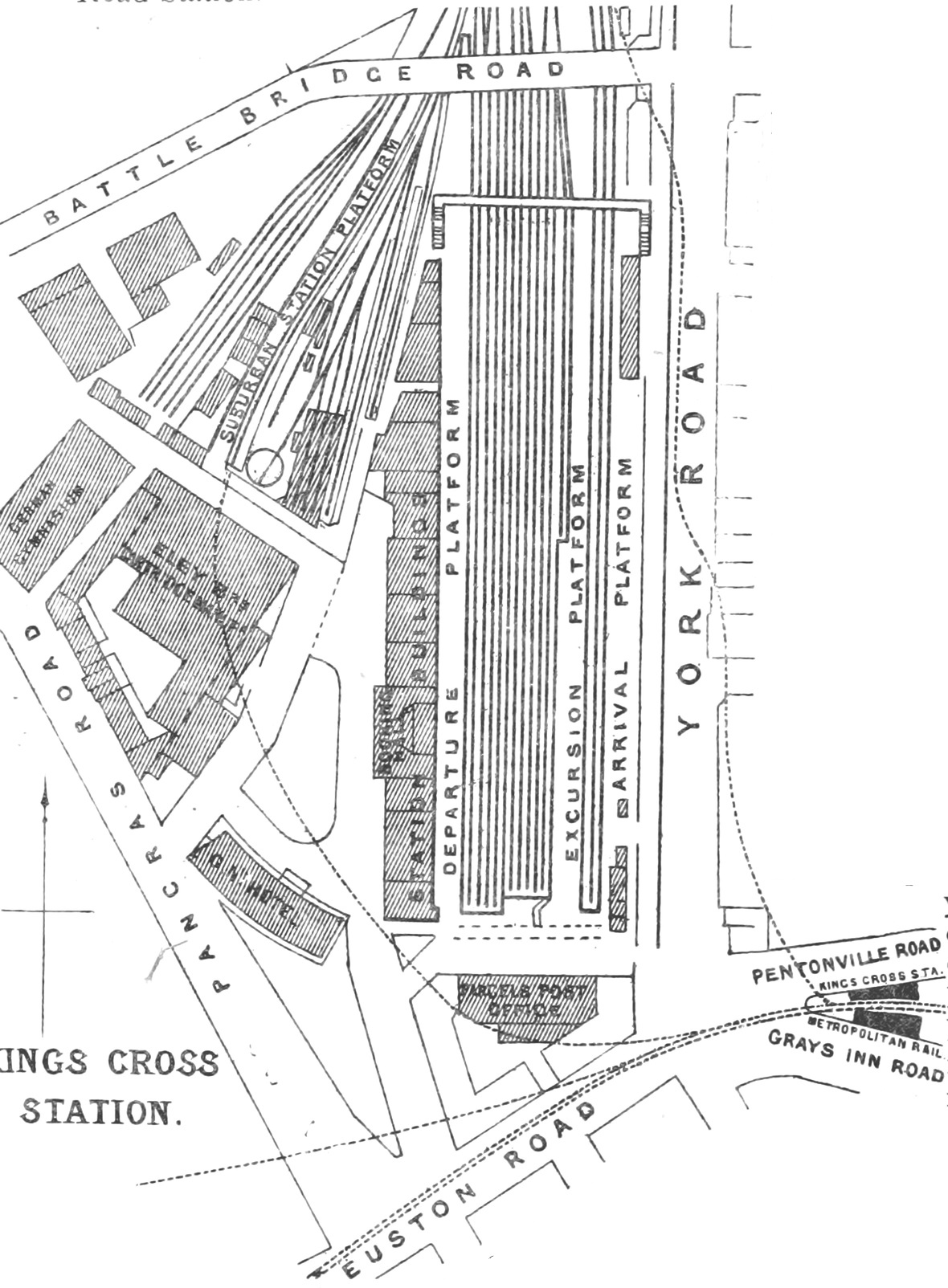
Plan of King's Cross in 1888. Originally, there was only one arrival and one departure platform.

The station, the biggest in England at that time, opened on 14 October 1852. Suburban traffic quickly grew with the opening of stations at Hornsey in 1850, Holloway Road in 1856, Wood Green in 1859 and Seven Sisters Road (now Finsbury Park) in 1861. Midland Railway services to Leicester via Hitchin and Bedford began running from King's Cross on 1 February 1858; these ceased a decade later when St Pancras station opened. More platforms were added in 1862: No. 2 was full-length, but No. 3 was stepped into the northern end of the station. In 1866, a connection was made via the Metropolitan Railway to the London, Chatham and Dover Railway at Farringdon, with goods and passenger services to South London via Herne Hill. A separate suburban station to the west of the main building, housing platforms 9–11 as of 1972 and known initially as "Kings Cross Main Line (Local) Station", opened in August 1875. A platform, later numbered platform 16, was opened on the connection to the Metropolitan Railway on 1 February 1878; previously, trains had had to reverse into the main station. An iron footbridge was built halfway down the train shed to connect all the platforms. By 1880, half the traffic at King's Cross was suburban.

A significant bottleneck in the early years of operations was the Gasworks Tunnel underneath the Regent's Canal immediately to the north of the station, which was built with a single up track and a single down track. Commercial traffic was further impeded by having to cross over on-level running lines to reach the goods yard. Grade separation of goods traffic was achieved by constructing the skew bridge that opened in August 1877, and the second and third Gas Works tunnels opened in 1878 and 1892 respectively.

On 15 September 1881, a light engine and a coal train collided near the mouth of the Copenhagen Tunnel north of the station because of a signalman's error. One person was killed and another was severely injured. Bad weather contributed to occasional flooding in the tunnels. One such incident in July 1901 suspended all traffic from the station for more than four hours, which happened at no other London terminus. King's Cross sustained no damage during World War I even though large amounts of high explosives were carried to the station in passenger trains during the war. When possible, trains were parked in tunnels in the event of enemy aircraft overhead.

=== London and North Eastern Railway (1923–1948) ===
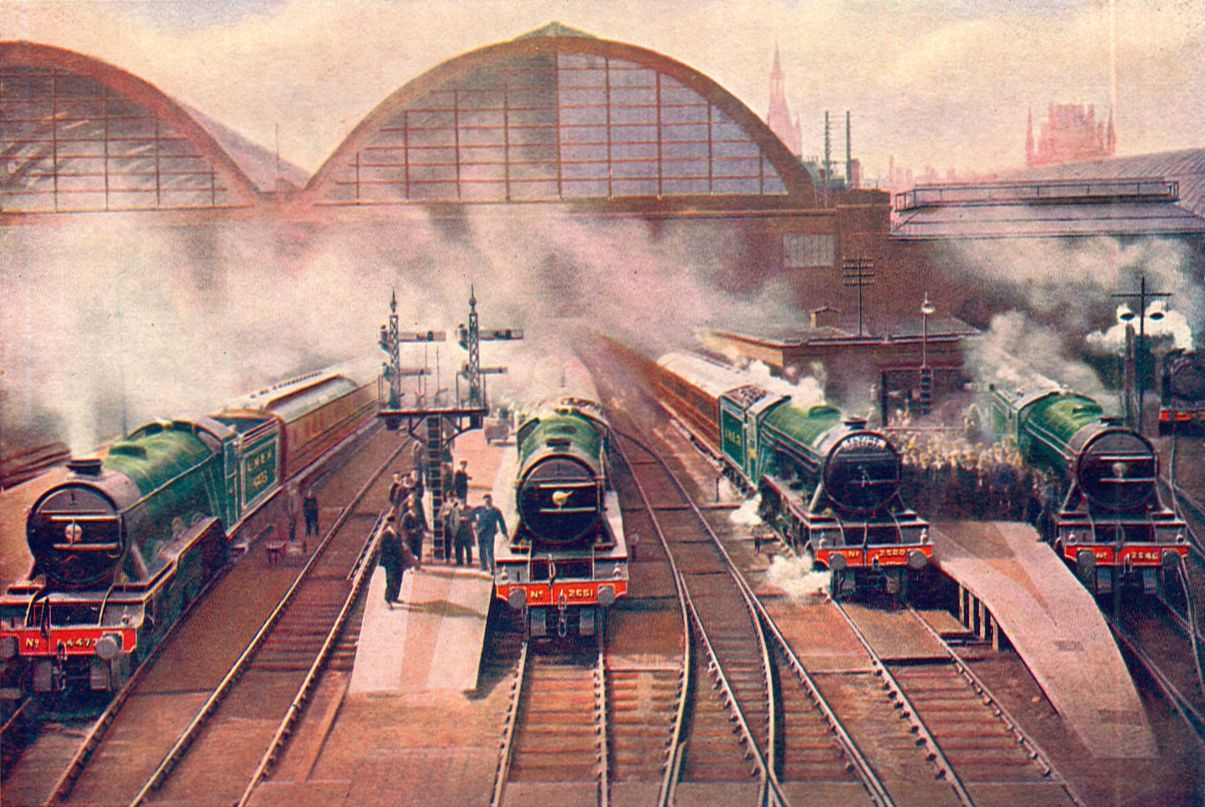
Steam trains at King's Cross in 1928

Kings Cross came into the ownership of the London and North Eastern Railway (LNER) following the Railways Act 1921. The LNER made improvements to various amenities, including toilets and dressing rooms underneath what is now platform 8. The lines through the Gas Works tunnels were remodelled between 1922 and 1924 and improved signalling made it easier to manage the increasing number of local trains.

A number of famous trains have been associated with King's Cross, such as the Flying Scotsman service to Edinburgh. The Gresley A3 and later streamlined A4 Pacific steam locomotives handled express services from the 1930s until 1966. The most famous of these was Mallard, which holds the world speed record for steam locomotives at 126 miles per hour (203 km/h), set in 1938.

King's Cross handled large numbers of troops alongside civilian traffic during World War II. Engine shortages meant that up to 2,000 people had to be accommodated on each train. In the early hours of Sunday 11 May 1941, two 1,000 pounds (450 kg) bombs fell on the, then, platform 10 at the west side of the station, damaging a newspaper train in that platform and destroying the general offices, booking hall and a bar, and bringing down a large section of roof. Twelve people were killed. On 4 February 1945, a passenger train to Leeds and Bradford stalled in the Gasworks Tunnel, ran back and was derailed in the station. Two people were killed and 25 were injured. Services were not fully restored until 23 February.

=== British Rail (1948–1996) ===
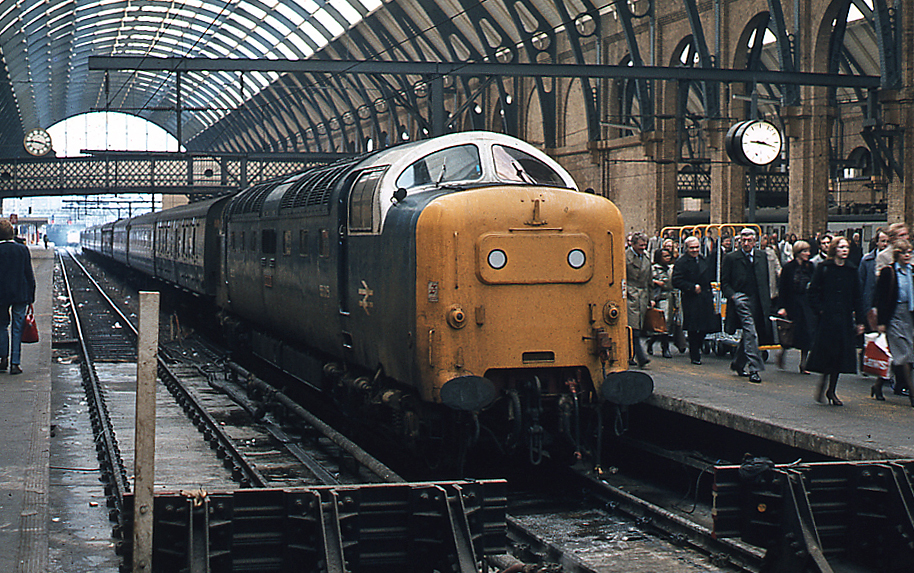
Train headed by a Class 55 'Deltic' locomotive at King's Cross platform 5 in 1978. These were the principal express locomotives on the East Coast Main Line in the 1960s and 1970s.

Following nationalisation on 1 January 1948, King's Cross came under the management of British Railways' Eastern Region. Diesel services were introduced during the 1950s when steam was being phased out. All main line services were converted to diesel by June 1963. Platform numbers were reorganised in 1972, to run consecutively from 1 (east) to 14 (west). The track layout was simplified in the 1970s by reusing an old flyover for freight near the Copenhagen Tunnel at Holloway, and reducing the number of running lines through the Gasworks Tunnel from six to four. At the same time, electrification started with the installation of a 25 kV overhead line to cater for suburban services as part of the Great Northern Suburban Electrification project. The works were completed on 3 April 1977, and electric services began running from King's Cross to Hertford, Welwyn Garden City and Royston.

The construction of the Victoria line and its interchange at King's Cross was seen by British Rail as an opportunity to modernise the station. A single-storey extension containing the main passenger concourse and ticket office, designed in-house, was built at the front of the station in 1972. Although intended to be temporary, it was still standing 40 years later, obscuring the Grade I-listed façade of the original station. Before the extension was built, the façade was hidden behind a small terrace of shops.

On 10 September 1973, a Provisional IRA bomb exploded in the booking hall at 12.24 p.m., causing extensive damage and injuring six people, some seriously. The 3 lb (1.4 kg) device was thrown without warning by a youth who escaped into the crowd and was not caught. King's Cross was a London terminus for InterCity 125 high speed services, along with Paddington. By 1982, almost all long-distance trains leaving King's Cross were 125s. The service proved to be popular, and the station saw regular queues across the concourse to board departing trains. The King's Cross fire in 1987 started in the machine room for a wooden escalator between the main line station and the London Underground station's Piccadilly line platforms. The escalator burned and much of the tube station caught fire, killing 31 people, with smoke spreading to the main line station.

In 1987, British Rail proposed building a new station with four platforms for international trains through the Channel Tunnel, and four for Thameslink trains under King's Cross. After six years of design work, the plans were abandoned, and the international terminal was constructed at St Pancras. British Rail completed electrification of the East Coast Main Line to Leeds and Edinburgh between 1985 and 1991, and electric InterCity 225 rolling stock was introduced to work express services. These began service between King's Cross and Leeds on 2 October 1989, and to Edinburgh on 8 July 1991.

=== Privatisation (1996–present) ===
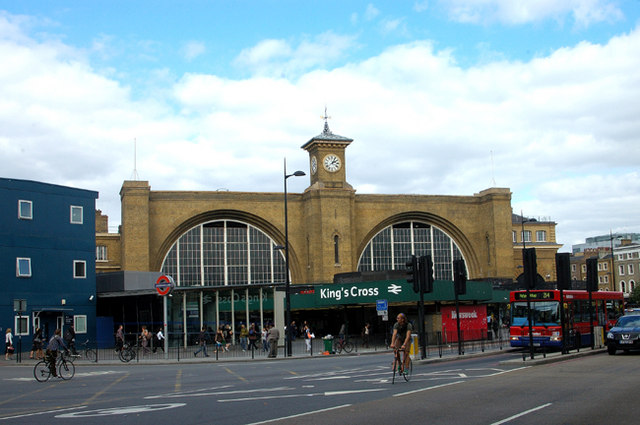
The former concourse in 2009

Before privatisation, the King's Cross area had a reputation for run-down buildings and prostitution in front of the main entrance. There was a major clean-up during the 1990s and the station's atmosphere was much improved by the end of the decade. Following the privatisation of British Rail in 1996, express services into the station were taken over by the Great North Eastern Railway (GNER). The company refurbished the British Rail Mark 4 "Mallard" rolling stock used for long-distance services from King's Cross and the inauguration of the new-look trains took place in the presence of the Queen and the Duke of Edinburgh in 2003.

GNER successfully re-bid for the franchise in 2005, but surrendered it in the following year. National Express East Coast took over the franchise in late 2007 after an interim period when trains ran under a management contract. In 2009, it was announced that National Express was no longer willing to finance the East Coast subsidiary, and the franchise was taken back into public ownership and handed over to East Coast in November. In March 2015 the franchise was re-privatised and taken over by Virgin Trains East Coast. In November 2017, Transport Secretary Chris Grayling announced the early termination of the East Coast franchise in 2020, three years ahead of schedule, following losses on the route by the operator. The current provider of ECML services is London North Eastern Railway. In October 2021, Lumo commenced operating services to Edinburgh Waverley via Stevenage, Newcastle and Morpeth.

=== Restoration ===
The new departures concourse in 2012

The £500 million restoration plan announced by Network Rail in 2005 was approved by Camden London Borough Council in 2007. It involved restoring and reglazing the original arched train shed roof and removing the 1972 extension at the front of the station and replacing it with an open-air plaza. The extension was demolished in late 2012, revealing the Lewis Cubitt architecture. In its place, the 75,000-square-foot (7,000 m^{2}) King's Cross Square was created, and opened to the public on 26 September 2013.

The new semi-circular departures concourse opened to the public in March 2012. Situated to the west of the station behind the Great Northern Hotel, it was designed by John McAslan and built by Taylor Woodrow Construction. It caters for much-increased passenger flows and provides greater integration between the intercity, suburban and underground sections of the station. The architect claimed that the roof is the longest single-span station structure in Europe and the semi-circular structure has a radius of 59 yards (54 m) and more than 2,000 triangular roof panels, half of which are glass. The steel structure of the roof, engineered by Arup, has been described as being "like some kind of reverse waterfall, a white steel grid that swoops up from the ground and cascades over your head".

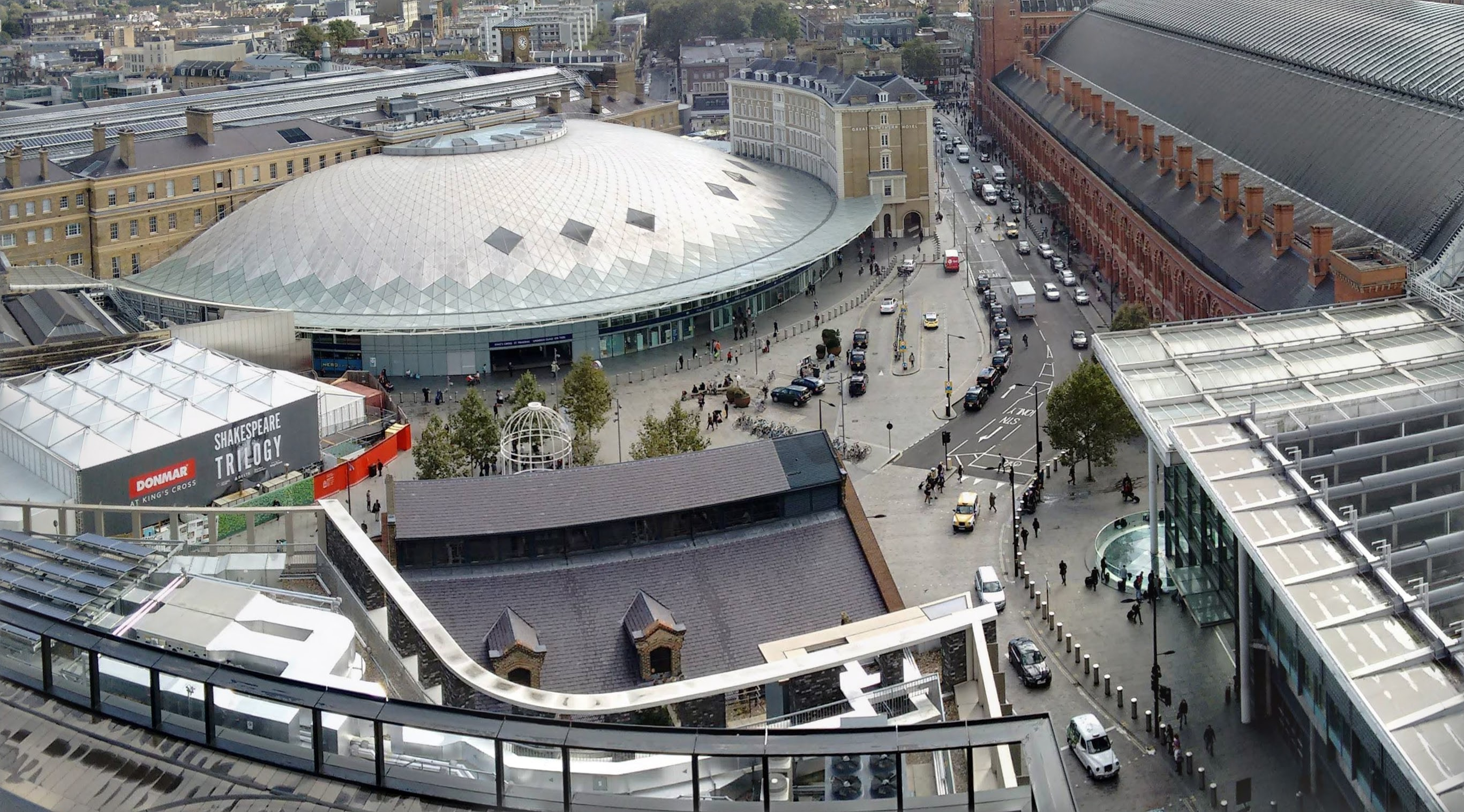
The new concourse seen from above. St Pancras railway station is to the right.

Land between and behind Kings Cross and St Pancras stations is being redeveloped as King's Cross Central with around 2,000 new homes, 5,000,000 sq ft (464,500 m^{2}) of offices and new roads. In the restoration, refurbished offices have opened on the east side of the station to replace ones lost on the west side, and a new platform, numbered 0, opened underneath them on 20 May 2010. Diesel trains cannot normally use this platform for environmental reasons. The restoration project was awarded a European Union Prize for Cultural Heritage / Europa Nostra Award in 2013.

=== Accidents and incidents ===
There have been many passenger train accidents at King's Cross over the years. The most serious were the King's Cross railway accident on 4 February 1945 which killed two people and injured 25 and a collision in Gasworks Tunnel on 15 September 1881 which killed one person and seriously injured another. The most recent was on 17 September 2015 when a passenger train collided with the buffer stops, injuring fourteen people. There have also been a number of accidents which killed or injured railway employees.

On 5 November 1979, Martin Allen was seen saying goodbye to his friends at King's Cross. He set off in the direction of the Piccadilly line platform, but he was never seen again. The station is also where Andrew Gosden was last seen before going missing on 14 September 2007. He had caught a train there from Doncaster under controversial and unexplained circumstances.

== Layout and connected stations ==
The original 1852 station had only one arrival and one departure platform (today's platforms 1 and 8), and the space between was used for carriage sidings. Two platforms (now 5 and 6) were opened on 18 December 1893 to cater for increased traffic demands. The platforms have been reconfigured several times. They were numbered 1 to 8 in 1972. Platform 0 was opened to the east of the main station shed in 2010 as part of the ongoing restoration programme.

Since 2020, the station has had 11 platforms, numbered 0 to 10 from east to west. Platforms 9 and 10 are short platforms and separated from platforms 0 to 8. Until 2021 there were 12 platforms, numbered 0 to 11 from east to west, but following extensive track remodelling, platform 10 was taken out of use, with platform 11 being relabelled 10.

=== Remodelling ===
The remodelled station approach with the reopened eastern bore of the Gasworks Tunnel on the far right

In January 2018, it was announced that half the station would close for 3 months from January to March 2020 for remodelling work to the station and its approach, expected to cost £237 million. This included rationalisation of the tracks, removal of sidings, reopening the third bore of the Gasworks Tunnel directly before the station, and closure of platform 10. In June 2021, Network Rail released a time lapse video showing the completion of the works.

=== Connected railway stations ===
==== King's Cross York Road ====
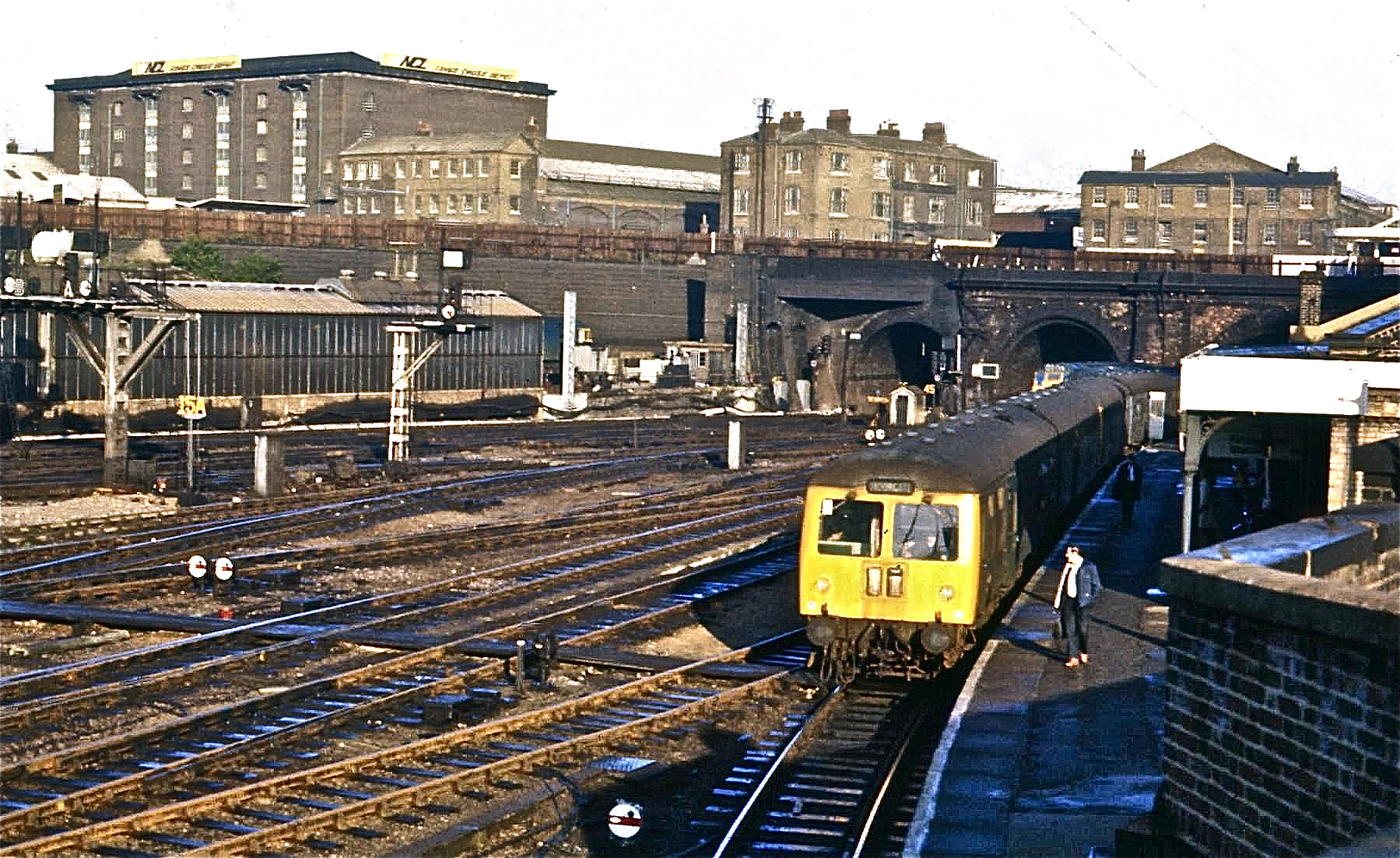
Class 105 at Kings Cross, York Road station on the last day of diesel services to Moorgate

From 1863, part of King's Cross was an intermediate station. On the extreme east of the site, King's Cross York Road station was served by suburban trains from Finsbury Park before they followed the sharply curved and steeply graded York Road Tunnel to join the City Widened Lines to Farringdon, Barbican and Moorgate. In the other direction, trains from Moorgate came off the Widened Lines via the Hotel Curve, to platform 16 (latterly renumbered 14) which rose to the main line level. Services to and from Moorgate were diverted via the Northern City Line from November 1976. The station remained in occasional use until it was completely closed on 5 March 1977.

==== Great Northern Cemetery Station ====
The Great Northern Cemetery Station was built just to the east of the northern portal to Gasworks Tunnel, to connect the city to New Southgate Cemetery. It opened in 1861 but was never profitable as it only ran for 7 miles (11 km) and closed two years later.

== Services ==
Platforms 5 to 8, with three LNER Azuma trains

The station hosts services on inter-city routes to the East of England, Yorkshire, North East England and eastern and northern Scotland, connecting to major cities and towns such as Cambridge, Peterborough, Hull, Doncaster, Leeds, Bradford, York, Middlesbrough, Sunderland, Newcastle, Edinburgh, Aberdeen and Inverness. Since June 2018, these major routes have been under government control, taking over from Stagecoach and Virgin.

King's Cross is one of the 18 stations in the London station group. A ticket marked "London Terminals" allows travel to any station in the group via any permitted route.

Five train operating companies (TOC) run services from King's Cross:

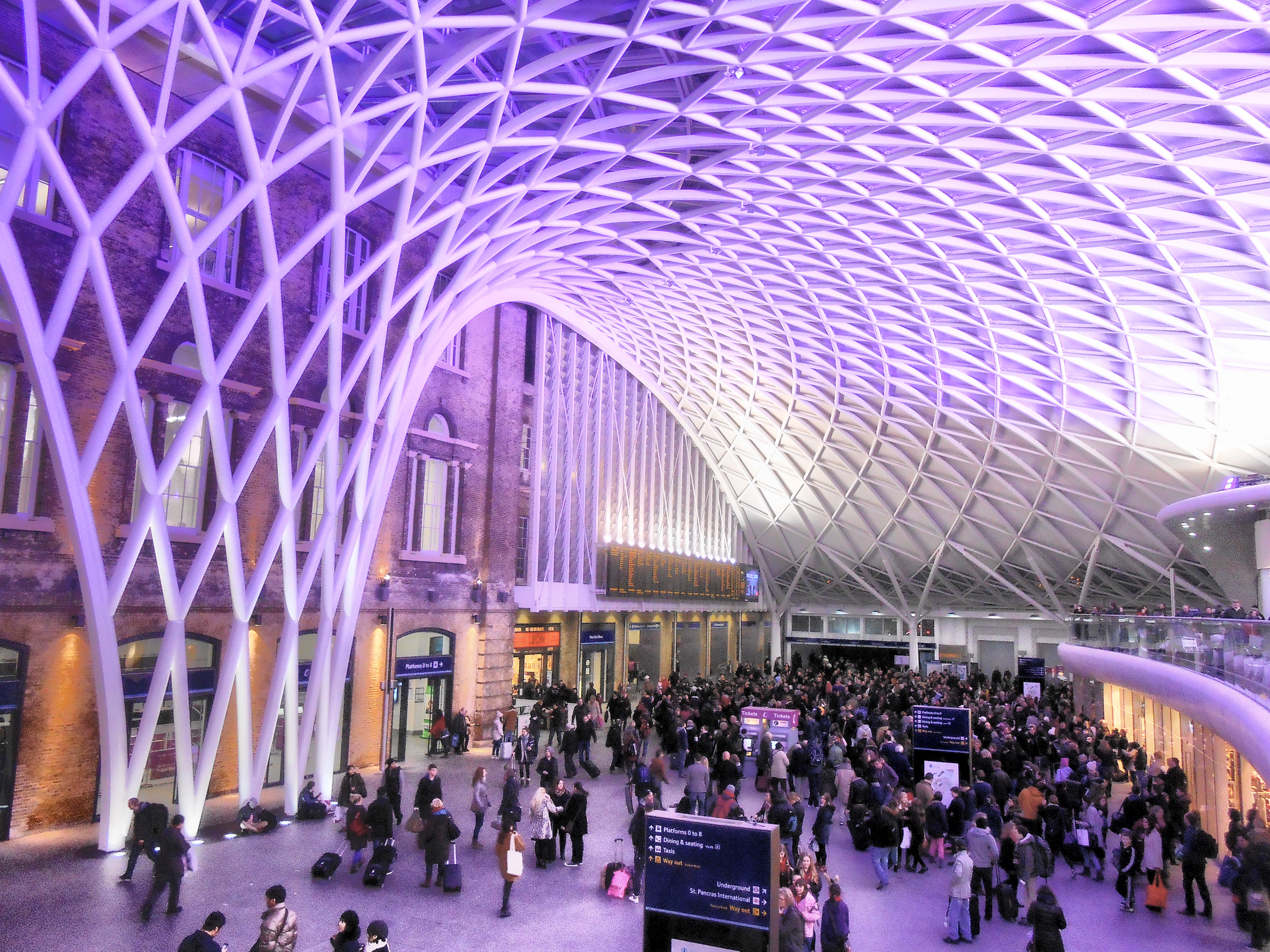
The refurbished concourse in 2013

=== London North Eastern Railway ===
London North Eastern Railway operates high speed inter-city services along the East Coast Main Line. The standard off-peak service pattern in trains per hour (tph) is as follows:

- 1 tph to Lincoln or York (alternating)
- 2 tph to Leeds, of which one every two hours is extended to each of Bradford Forster Square and Harrogate
- 1 tph (fast service) to Edinburgh Waverley
- 1 tph (semi-fast service) to Edinburgh Waverley, of which four trains per day are extended to Aberdeen
- 1 tph (semi-fast service) to Newcastle

=== Greater Thameslink Railway ===
Greater Thameslink Railway operates outer-suburban services to North London, Hertfordshire, Cambridgeshire and West Norfolk under their Great Northern brand. The standard off-peak service pattern in trains per hour (tph) is as follows:

- 2 tph to Letchworth Garden City, with 1 tph extending to Cambridge. These call at principal stations to Hatfield, then all stations thence to Letchworth Garden City and Cambridge, excluding Ashwell & Morden.
- 2 tph to Ely or Kings Lynn (alternating). These run non-stop as far as Cambridge South.

Throughout Sundays, the company also serves Peterborough once per hour, calling at all stations north of Stevenage. Throughout the off-peak hours of Monday to Saturday, travellers wishing to access these stations need to change at Finsbury Park or use the nearby low-level station at St Pancras International.

=== Hull Trains ===
Hull Trains operates five inter-city services per weekday to Hull and two per weekday to Beverley, via the East Coast Main Line. Unlike other train companies in FirstGroup, Hull Trains operates under an open-access arrangement.

=== Grand Central ===
Grand Central operates inter-city services to Bradford Interchange and Sunderland along the East Coast Main Line and is an open-access operator. On 23 May 2010, it began services to Bradford Interchange via Halifax, Brighouse, Mirfield, Wakefield, Pontefract and Doncaster. The service had originally been due to begin in December 2009.

On Monday–Friday, there are four trains per day to Bradford Interchange (of which two will call at Pontefract Monkhill) and five trains per day to Sunderland.

=== Lumo ===
Lumo, another FirstGroup open access operator, operates five services per day to Edinburgh via Newcastle and Morpeth. Two of the daily services also call to pick up passengers at Stevenage. Two trains per day northbound extend to Glasgow Queen Street and one train per day starts from there.

| Preceding station | National Rail | Following station |
|---|---|---|
| Terminus | Hull Trains; London-Hull/Beverley | Stevenage or Grantham |
| Terminus | London North Eastern Railway; London-Leeds/Harrogate | Stevenage or Peterborough |
| Terminus | London North Eastern Railway; East Coast Main Line; Flying Scotsman Edinburgh-London | York |
| Terminus | London North Eastern Railway; London-Edinburgh | Peterborough or York |
| Terminus | London North Eastern Railway; London-Newcastle/Edinburgh semi-fast | Stevenage or Peterborough |
| Terminus | London North Eastern Railway; London-Lincoln/York | Stevenage or Peterborough |
| Terminus | London North Eastern Railway; London-Hull; One train a day | Peterborough |
| Terminus | London North Eastern Railway; London-Middlesbrough; One train per weekday | York |
| Terminus | Grand Central; North Eastern; London-Sunderland | Peterborough or York |
| Terminus | Grand Central; West Riding; London-Bradford Interchange | Peterborough or Doncaster |
| Terminus | Great Northern; Cambridge Cruiser | Cambridge |
| Terminus | Great Northern; London-Kings Lynn/Ely | Cambridge |
| Terminus | Great Northern; London-Cambridge (stopping services) | Finsbury Park |
| Terminus | Lumo; London to Edinburgh/Glasgow | Stevenage |
| Terminus | Lumo; London to Edinburgh/Glasgow | Newcastle |
| | Disused railways | |
| Finsbury Park | British Rail; Eastern Region; City Widened Lines | Farringdon via King's Cross York Road |
| | Historical railways | |
| Terminus | Great Northern Railway; East Coast Main Line | Holloway & Caledonian Road; Line open, station closed |

== Cultural references ==
=== In fiction ===
The station is mentioned in Chapter 2 of E.M. Forster's 1910 novel Howards End, where it suggests "infinity" to the eldest Schlegel daughter, Margaret, and contrasted with the "facile splendours" of St. Pancras. In the Reverend Wilbert Awdry's 1957 children's book The Eight Famous Engines, Gordon the Big Engine undertakes a journey to London, hoping to reach King's Cross, but ends up at St Pancras instead.

In the 1994 children's book The Secret of Platform 13 by Eva Ibbotson. Platform 13 of King's Cross Station in London has been closed for years. Changes to the platform always result in failure for mysterious reasons. The reason is that the platform hides a gump, described as an "opening that opens once every nine years for nine days". The gump leads to the Island, a wonderful mythical paradise filled with both normal and magical creatures.

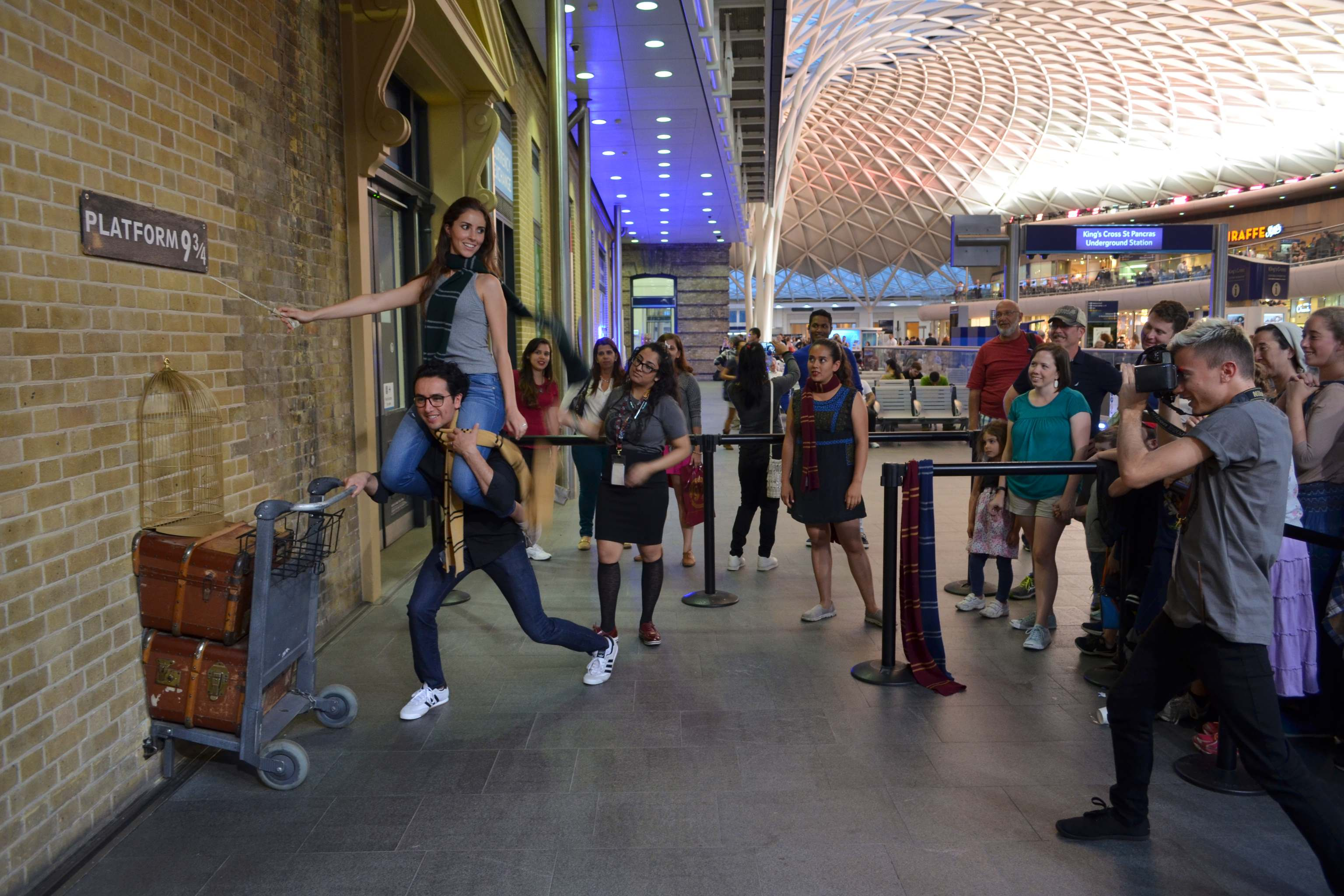
Tourists at Platform 9 3/4 in the western departures concourse

King's Cross features in the Harry Potter books, by J. K. Rowling, as the starting point of the Hogwarts Express. The train uses a secret Platform 9 3/4 accessed through the brick wall barrier between platforms 9 and 10. In fact, platforms 9 and 10 are in a separate building from the main station and are separated by two intervening tracks. Instead, the brick roof-support arches between platforms 4 and 5 were redressed by the film crew and used to represent a brick wall that does not exist between the real platforms 9 and 10.

By 2003, a sign marking Platform 9 3/4 was put up at the station, with a trolley fixed to the wall added by the year 2005. The location of the trolley moved after renovations, and a Harry Potter-themed shop opened nearby in 2012. Because of the temporary buildings obscuring the façade of the real King's Cross station until 2012, the Harry Potter films showed St. Pancras in exterior station shots instead.

When The Wizarding World of Harry Potter at Universal Orlando Resort expanded to Universal Studios Florida, the Wizarding Worlds in both Diagon Alley at Universal Studios Florida and Hogsmeade at Universal's Islands of Adventure were connected with the Hogwarts Express. The Universal Studios Florida station is based on King's Cross station and Platform 9 3/4, including a quarter-scale replica of the façade of King's Cross as the entrance to the station. It opened on 8 July 2014, alongside Harry Potter and the Escape from Gringotts. It replaced the Jaws ride and the Amity Island themed area based on the Jaws franchise, which was permanently closed on 2 January 2012.

=== In film ===
The station, its surrounding streets and the railway approach feature prominently in the 1955 Ealing comedy film The Ladykillers. In the story, a gang robs a security van near the station after planning in a house overlooking the railway. When they fall out, members of the gang are dropped into passing goods wagons from the parapet of the Copenhagen Tunnel north of the station.

The 1986 crime drama film Mona Lisa is set around King's Cross. At the time, the downmarket and seedy area surrounding the station, coupled with urban decay, made it an ideal location. Subsequent early 1990s tabloid coverage of crime and prostitution around King's Cross referred back to the film.

Pet Shop Boys released a song titled "King's Cross" on the 1987 album Actually and the station was extensively filmed in for the group's 1988 feature film It Couldn't Happen Here. The band's singer Neil Tennant said that the station was a recognisable landmark coming into London, attempting to find opportunities away from the high unemployment areas of Northeast England at the time. The song was primarily about "hopes being dashed" and "an epic nightmare". The group subsequently asked filmmaker Derek Jarman to direct a background video for "King's Cross" for their 1989 tour, which featured a black and white sequence of juddery camera movements around the local area. Despite the song's reference to "dead and wounded on either side", it was actually released a few months before the King's Cross fire.

=== Monopoly ===
King's Cross station is a square on the British Monopoly board. The other three stations in the game are Marylebone, Fenchurch Street and Liverpool Street, and all four were LNER termini at the time the game was being designed for the British market in the mid-1930s.
