= Gasworks Tunnel =

- The Gasworks Tunnel in 2026 from London King's Cross railway station
- Interactive map of Gasworks Tunnel

Overview
- Line: East Coast Main Line
- Location: Kings Cross, London
- Coordinates: 51°32′07″N 0°07′24″W
- Status: All three bores in use (since 2021)
- System: National Rail
- Crosses: Regent's Canal

Operation
- Constructed: Central bore: 1852; Eastern bore: 1877; Western bore: 1892
- Owner: Network Rail
- Operator: See East Coast Main Line § Operators

Technical
- Length: 528 yd (483 m)
- No. of tracks: 6
- Track gauge: 4 ft 8 1/2 in (1,435 mm) standard gauge
- Electrified: 25 kV 50 Hz AC
- Operating speed: Up: 20 mph (32 km/h); Down: 45 mph (72 km/h)

The Gasworks Tunnel, also historically known as the Maiden Lane Tunnel, is a railway tunnel immediately to the north of King's Cross railway station in London, United Kingdom. It consists of three parallel bores which carry the six tracks of the East Coast Main Line under the Regent's Canal, as well as roads and housing. Each bore is 528 yards (483 m) in length and all the tracks are designed to be used bi-directionally.

Each bore was opened separately between 1852 and 1892. In 1977, as part of greater modernisation efforts, the eastern bore was taken out of use and the other two bores were converted to be used bi-directionally. To increase capacity, the eastern bore was reinstated in 2021 as part of a larger upgrade of the station and the entire East Coast Main Line.

== Design ==
The Gasworks Tunnel consists of three parallel bores, officially named the East Bore, Centre Bore, and West Bore. These carry six lines lettered A–F respectively and are all 528 yards (483 m) in length and are situated 0 miles 22 chains (0.28 miles, 0.44 km) to 0 miles 46 chains (0.57 miles, 0.93 km) from the zero point at London King's Cross railway station, from where mileage on the East Coast Main Line is measured. The architecture is simple in nature, with circular portals decorated with a cornice and voussoir.

The speed limit in all the bores is 20 mph (32 km/h) towards King's Cross (up direction) and 45 mph (72 km/h) away from King's Cross (down direction). All six lines are designed to be used bi-directionally, and all three bores contain points, with the east and central bores containing a trailing point and the west and central bores containing a facing point. These points must be used by trains to allow bi-directional access to all platforms except 2, 5, and 7. The tunnel, along with the other eight between King's Cross and Peterborough, is perfectly straight, unlike most of the line. This is because curved tunnels were not possible with the technology of the time.

The platforms at London King's Cross cannot be lengthened because of their proximity to the Gasworks Tunnel, thus preventing longer trains from being used on the East Coast Main Line. An additional challenge is presented by the strong gradient, with a descent of 1 in 79 (1.27%) into the bores, before ascending at a rate of 1 in 105 (0.95%) towards the northern portal; despite this, it was claimed on many documents to in fact have no gradient. The tunnel is the first on the line and the next tunnel down the line is the Copenhagen Tunnel.

== History ==
=== 19th century ===
The first of the tunnel bores was built as part of the construction of the Great Northern Railway between 1851 and 1852, and was intended to carry the railway below the Regent's Canal. The original tunnel now forms the central of three parallel bores. A second bore to the east was built in 1878, and a third one to the west in 1892. The Gasworks Tunnel's construction was particularly challenging due to the steep gradient and narrow clearances of the railway. The tunnel was named after the Gas Light and Coke Company, which had a gasworks to the south of Regents Canal near the railway.

On 29 December 1893, a passenger train travelling from King's Cross to Hatfield collided with seven empty coaches that were being shunted into the station to be used in an express service. In his report to the Board of Trade on the accident, railway engineer Horatio Arthur Yorke concluded that it was caused by an unexplained derailment of goods coaches, but that it was exacerbated by poor arrangements for shunting through the tunnels, which he called "hardly satisfactory".

=== 20th century ===
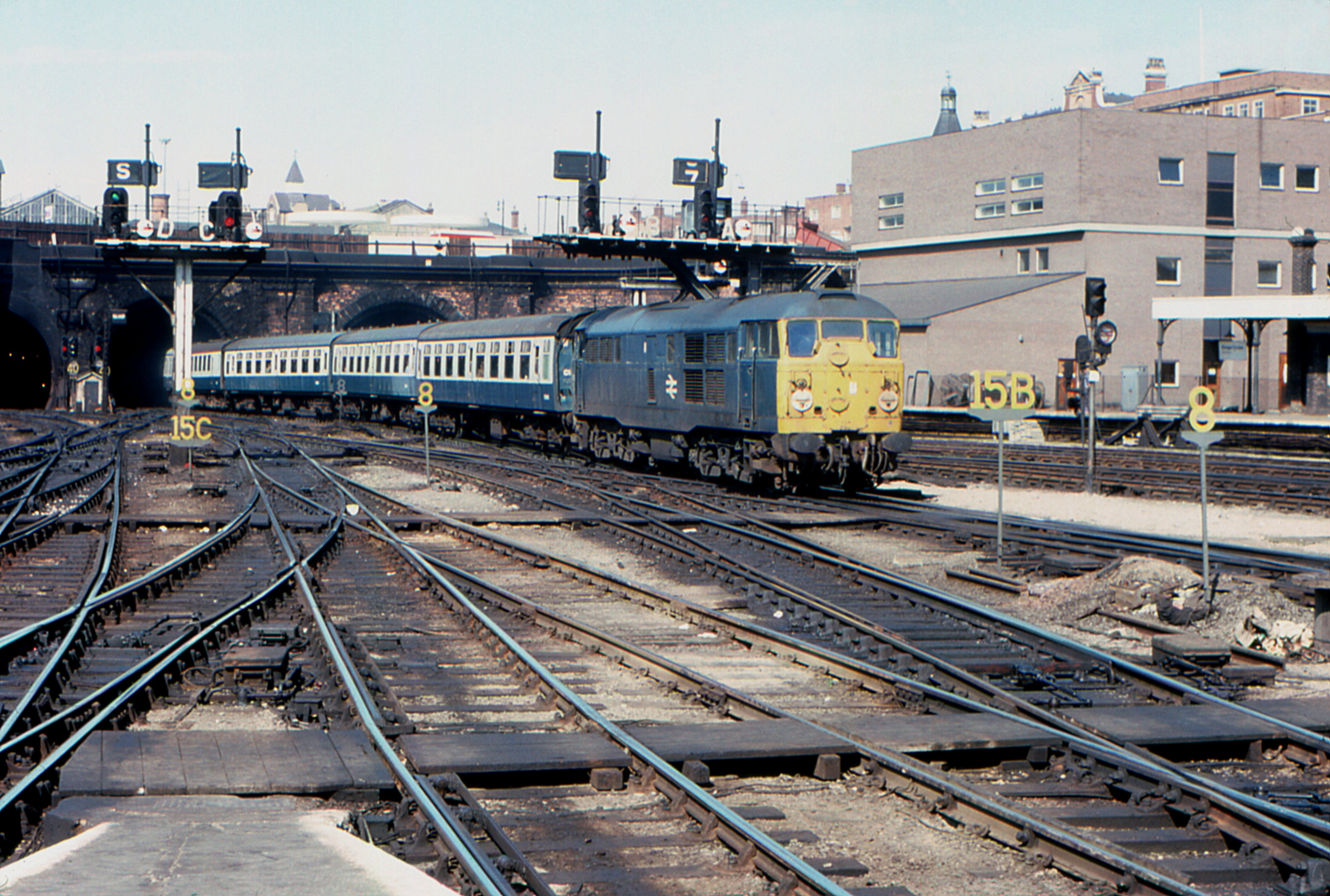
The Cambridge Buffet Express leaving the central bore in May 1976, a year before the eastern bore was taken out of use

On 10 December 1900, an express train travelling from Leeds to King's Cross became stuck in the Gasworks Tunnel due to rail slip, which then delayed other trains. The train managed to restart itself without external intervention. During World War II, some express services ran by the London and North Eastern Railway were so long that they stretched into the tunnel when the locomotive stopped at the buffers at King's Cross, including trains of more than twenty cars. On 4 February 1945, the King's Cross railway accident occurred when a heavy train of 17 coaches weighing approximately 590 long tons (600 t; 660 short tons) hauled by a Class A4 locomotive was unable to achieve the climb through the Gasworks Tunnel, slipped to a standstill and rolled back into the station, killing two passengers and injuring 25 others.

British Rail carried out electrification of the southern part of the East Coast Main Line with 25 kV AC overhead lines from London King's Cross to Hitchin between 1976 and 1977. This was authorised in 1971 for the benefit of London suburban services as part of the Great Northern Suburban Electrification Project. In 1977, the Gasworks Tunnel's eastern bore was taken out of use and its track bed removed. The closure formed part of the remodelling and rationalisation of the station, and other works included a completely new layout between the bores and the platforms, the introduction of bi-directional working in all three bores, and works to improve headroom at the southern end of the tunnel.

As part of its modernisation program, British Rail also began segregating trains by concentrating the suburban services in the western bore and long-distance services in the central bore. At the time of the eastern bore's closure, it had only ever been used by steam trains, and this had caused significant soot build-up in the Gasworks Tunnel which had to be removed during its renovation and reinstatement.

=== 21st century ===
The eastern bore (right) was reinstated in 2021.

As part of a larger modernisation program of London King's Cross and the East Coast Main Line, the eastern bore of the Gasworks Tunnel was reopened. Works began in August 2019 when 11,000 tonnes of spoil were removed from the bore before a new track bed was installed. The reopened bore meant that the number of tracks before the station throat increased from four to six, and this allowed for a 50% increase in capacity at King's Cross.

Because the Gasworks Tunnel sits below residential property, the track bed was built with elastic mats that soaked up vibrations. The works were made more difficult by the presence of third-party construction including piling above the bore, as well as the age and conditions inside. The inside of the bore was noisy and dusty with low visibility and mobile phone signal, which all presented extra challenges to contractors.

During a six-day closure of platforms 0–6 at King's Cross railway station on 25–30 December 2020, the station throat at King's Cross was redesigned to incorporate the reopening of the eastern bore. Overhead line equipment was added to the eastern bore during this closure, as well as new signalling and waterproofing for the Gasworks Tunnel. Platform zero was rebuilt to align with the bore, with services originally planned to start on 7 June 2021. The first London North Eastern Railway (LNER) train passed through the eastern bore at 07:01 on 26 April 2021, before arriving into the newly built platform zero.

In January 2024, the Gasworks Tunnel and the neighbouring Copenhagen Tunnel became the first in the country to have new signal-boosting technology fitted inside. This stops devices from losing signal and allows passengers to continue calls while travelling through the Gasworks Tunnel. The upgrade was funded entirely by the LNER. As of May 2025, the operators travelling into King's Cross via the Gasworks Tunnel include Grand Central, Great Northern and Thameslink, Hull Trains, London North Eastern Railway, and Lumo.

== See also ==
- Infrastructure of the East Coast Main Line
- Copenhagen Tunnel
- Barnet Tunnel
- Primrose Hill Tunnel
