= South Metropolitan Gas Company =

South Metropolitan Gas Light and Coke Company
- Industry: energy supply
- Founded: 1829
- Defunct: 1 May 1949
- Successor: South Eastern Gas Board, British Gas
- Headquarters: London, United Kingdom
- Key people: George Livesey, Chairman
- Products: Gas

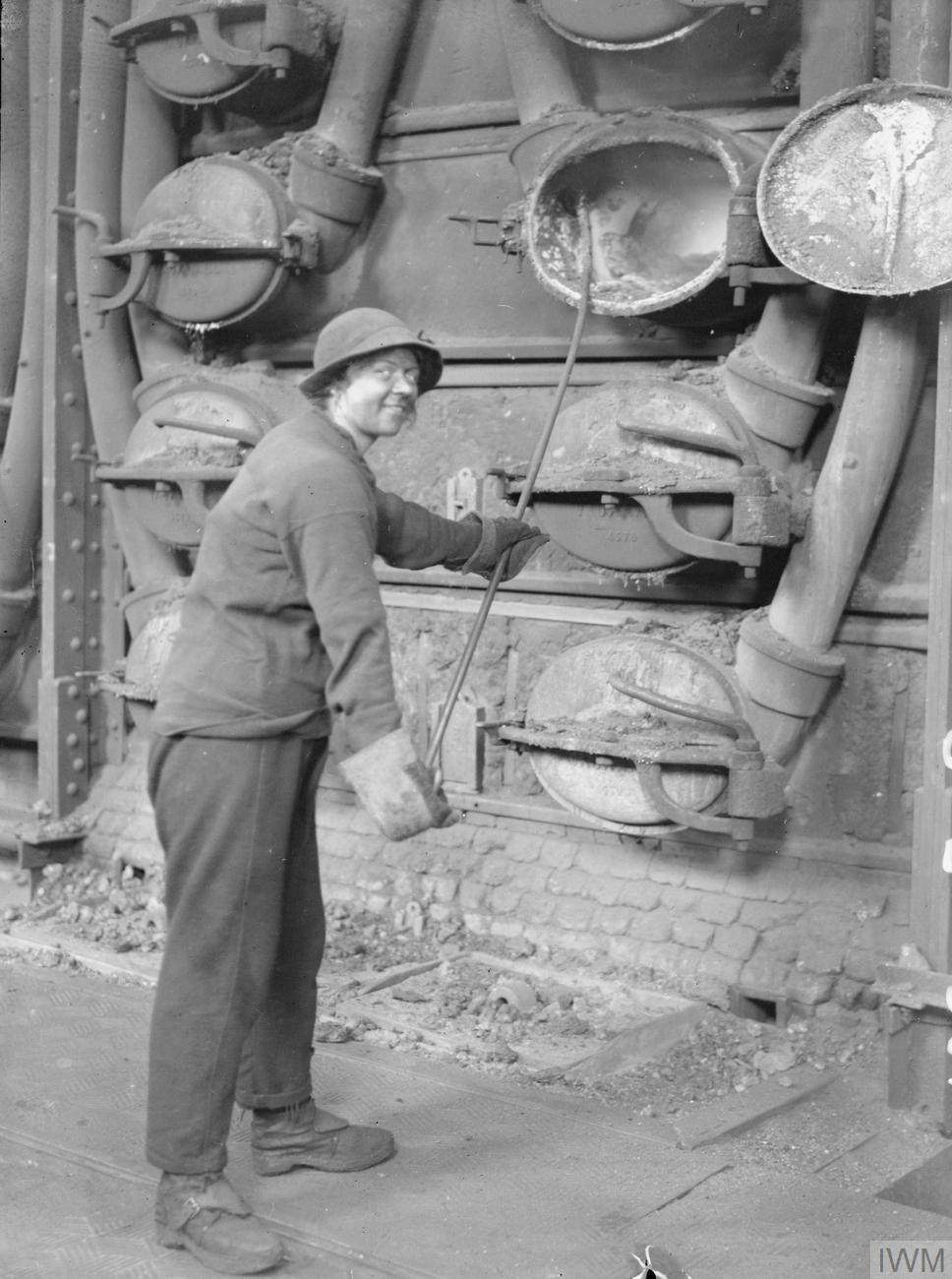
A worker charging a retort at a gas works during the Great War

The South Metropolitan Gas Company was a British gas company founded in 1829.

It selected a site on the eastern side of the Old Kent Road, adjacent to the Grand Surrey Canal for its works, which were completed in 1833. Offices for the company were added in 1834.

Thomas Livesey was appointed chief officer of the company in 1839.

South Metropolitan Gas Light and Coke Company Act 1842
- Act of Parliament
- Parliament of the United Kingdom
- Long title: An Act for incorporating the South Metropolitan Gas Light and Coke Company, and for more effectually lighting with Gas certain Places within the Borough of Southwark, and other Parishes and places in the Counties of Surrey and Kent.
- Citation: 5 & 6 Vict. c. lxxix

Dates
- Royal assent: 18 June 1842

Status: Amended

Text of statute as originally enacted

The company was incorporated by an act of Parliament in 1842, the South Metropolitan Gas Light and Coke Company Act 1842 (5 & 6 Vict. c. lxxix).

Thomas's son, George Livesey, joined the company in 1848, as his father's assistance, becoming general manager in 1857 and chief engineer in 1862. In 1871, following the death of Thomas Livesey, George became company secretary, a position he held until 1885 when he became chairman.

In 1880, the South Metropolitan Gas Company acquired the Phoenix Gas Light and Coke Company, bringing additional gasworks in Rotherhithe Street, Vauxhall, Bankside, and Thames Street in Greenwich.

In 1885, the company acquired two Woolwich gas companies, the Woolwich Equitable Gas Company and the Woolwich, Plumstead and Charlton Consumers' Gas Company.

The Woolwich Equitable Gas Company was founded by the Woolwich Equitable Gas Company's Act 1855 (18 & 19 Vict. c. xxvi).

The South Metropolitan Gas Company was nationalised by the Gas Act 1948 in 1949, and became part of the Metropolitan Division of the South Eastern Gas Board.

== Sites ==
=== Old Kent Road Gas Works ===
51°28′59″N 0°3′31″W

=== East Greenwich Gas Works ===
51°29′59″N 0°0′17″E

In 1881 a new site in East Greenwich, opposite Blackwall, was acquired, and the gasworks opened on 30 July 1887.

Part of the site is now covered by The O2 Arena.

=== Phoenix Gas Works, Bankside ===
South London Gas Act 1821
- Act of Parliament
- Parliament of the United Kingdom
- Long title: An Act for incorporating the South London Gas Light and Coke Company, situate in the Parish of Saint Saviour, in the County of Surrey.
- Citation: 1 & 2 Geo. 4. c. li

Dates
- Royal assent: 7 May 1821

Text of statute as originally enacted

Phœnix Gas Act 1824
- Act of Parliament
- Parliament of the United Kingdom
- Long title: An Act to establish an additional Company for more effectually lighting with Gas certain Places within the Borough of Southwark, and certain other Parishes and Places in the Counties of Surrey and Kent.
- Citation: 5 Geo. 4. c. lxxviii

Dates
- Royal assent: 28 May 1824

Other legislation
- Amended by: Phœnix Gas Act 1864

Text of statute as originally enacted

Phœnix Gas Act 1864
- Act of Parliament
- Parliament of the United Kingdom
- Long title: An Act to amend the Act relating to the Phœnix Gas Company, and to authorize such Company to raise more Capital, and purchase a certain Piece of Land; and for other Purposes.
- Citation: 27 & 28 Vict. c. clix

Dates
- Royal assent: 30 June 1864

Other legislation
- Amends: Southwark Gas Act 1824

Text of statute as originally enacted

51°30′27″N 0°6′2″W

A gas works was built at Bankside in 1814. In 1821 it was sold to the South London Gas Company, incorporated by the South London Gas Act 1821 (1 & 2 Geo. 4. c. li), which later became part of the Phoenix Gas Light and Coke Company, incorporated by the Phœnix Gas Act 1824 (5 Geo. 4. c. lxxviii).

The site was sold in 1938, with the land being used to expand Bankside Power Station.

=== Vauxhall Gas Works ===
51°29′10″N 0°7′31″W

The Phoenix Gas Company purchased the Vauxhall site, a redundant water treatment works, in 1847 from the Southwark and Vauxhall Water Company in 1847. The works were located south of Vauxhall Bridge, and north of the River Effra.

=== Thames Street Gas Works ===
51°28′58″N 0°1′2″W

Also known as West Greenwich Gas Works.
