= Livesey (surname) =

Livesey (/ˈlɪvzi/ LIV-zee) is a surname.

== Notable people with the surname include: ==
- Bekky Livesey (born 1995), British judoka
- Bill Livesey, American baseball manager and executive
- Charlie Livesey (1938–2005), English footballer
- Danny Livesey (born 1984), English football player
- George Livesey (1834–1908), British engineer, industrialist, namesake of the Livesey Hall War Memorial
- Harry Livesey GBE (1860–1932), British civil engineer
- Jeff Livesey (born 1966), American baseball player and coach
- Joseph Livesey (1794–1884), English temperance campaigner
- Michael Livesey (1614–c. 1665), one of the regicides of King Charles I
- Margot Livesey (born 1953), Scottish-born writer
- Owen Livesey (born 1991), British judoka
- Pete Livesey (1943–1998), English rock climber
- Roger Livesey (1906–1976), Welsh stage and film actor
- Tony Livesey (born 1964), British journalist and broadcaster

== Fictional characters ==
- Dr. Livesey (character), a fictional character in the novel Treasure Island, by Robert Louis Stevenson

== See also ==
- Livsey, a surname
- Livezey, a surname
