= John Moore & Sons =

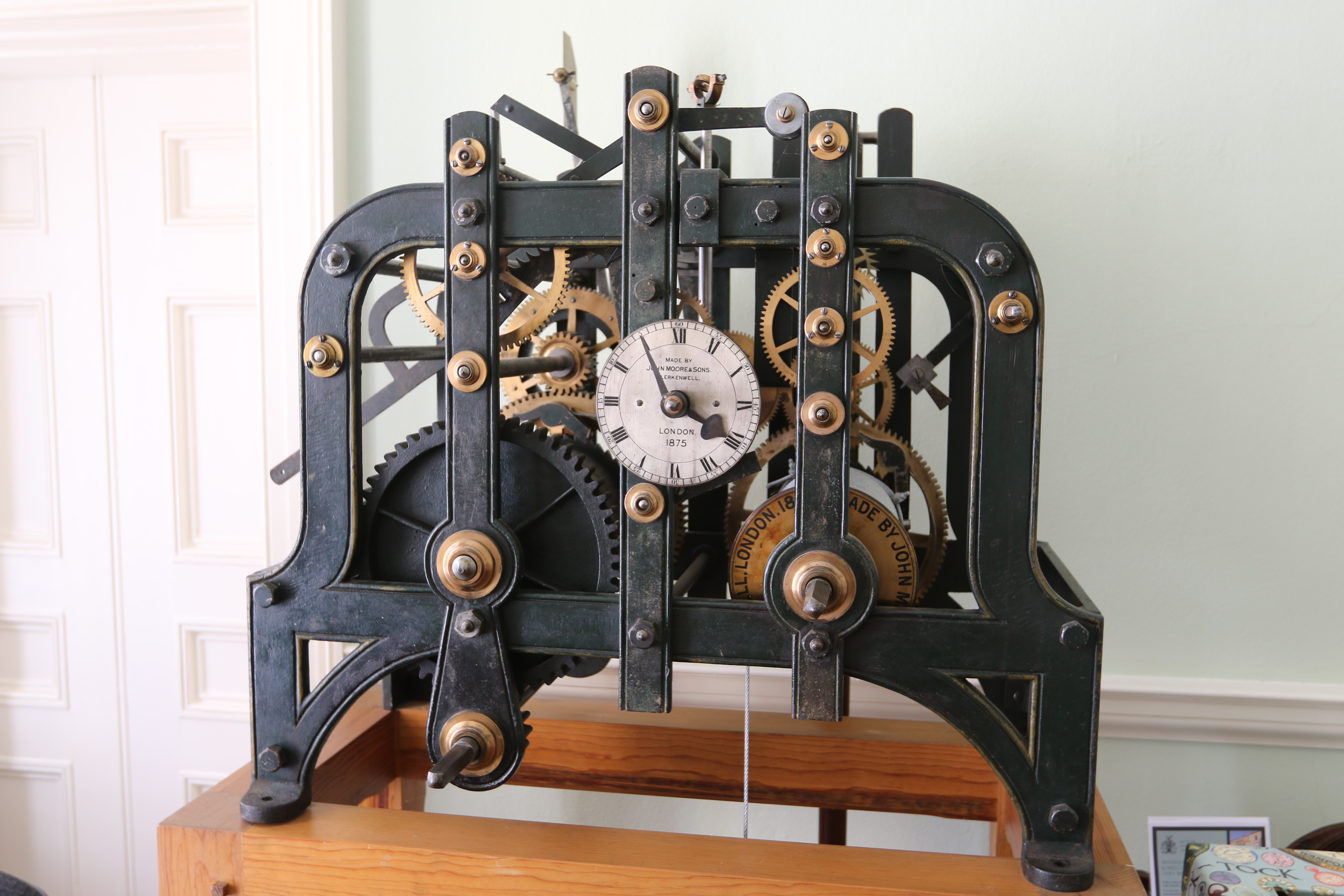
Turret clock of 1875 by John Moore and Sons (Museum of Timekeeping, Upton Hall, Nottinghamshire).

John Moore & Sons of Clerkenwell was a London-based clockmaker. For most of its history the firm's factory and main office was at 38-39 Clerkenwell Close, described in the 1850s as being 'situated in the very heart of the London watch and clock trade'.

== History ==
Benjamin Handley was born around 1770 but his parental origins are unclear. From 1796, Benjamin, former apprentice to John Thwaite, was trading as a clockmaker from 16,18 and then 20 Clerkenwell Close; by 1802 he had entered into a partnership there with John Moore, another former Thwaite apprentice. The firm then traded as Handley & Moore, producing their own clocks but also movements for other clockmakers such as John Grant senior, until 1820, when John Moore became sole proprietor after Benjamin died in 1819; by then, the business had moved to 38 Clerkenwell Close and in 1824 he expanded it into the adjacent building, No. 39. By 1829 the firm was known as John Moore & Sons (continuing as such until at least 1887). The sons, Benjamin and Josiah, had taken over the running of the firm by the 1850s, and subsequently the firm's clocks were sometimes (but not invariably) inscribed with 'B. R. & J. Moore'.

Through the 19th century the firm manufactured both house clocks and turret clocks, as well as wind dials, weathercocks and 'all kinds of wheel-machinery'. A publicity pamphlet of 1877 claimed that the number of house clocks made by the firm to January of that year was 15,180. It also lists numerous turret clocks, installed over the years in cathedrals, churches and other public buildings across the U.K. and overseas. Specialised clock movements were also produced, such as those designed to power the revolving lights or lenses of lighthouses and lightships. The firm also had a maintenance and repair department.

Around the year 1900, Moores moved from Clerkenwell Close to Spencer Street, where they went on to trade for a further twenty years or so as watchmakers.

== Examples ==
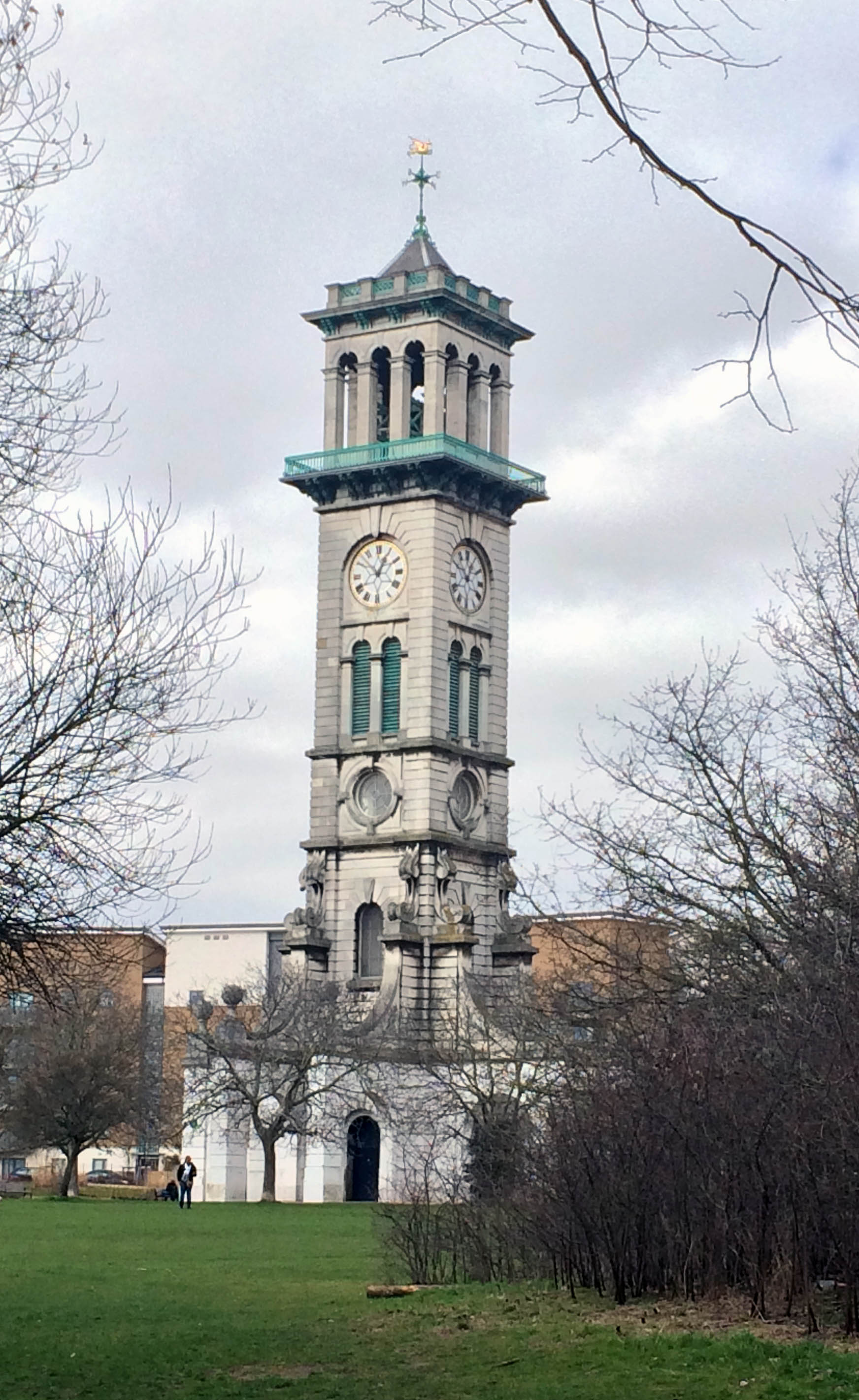
Caledonian Park Clock Tower (formerly the Metropolitan Cattle Market) retains its hand-wound Moore & Sons chiming clock of 1854.

Public clocks manufactured by John Moore and Sons included those installed in:

- Bridport Town Hall (1805)
- Truman's Brewery, Spitalfields (1805)
- Middle Temple Hall (1813)
- Dunkeld Cathedral (1814)
- Blair Castle (1814)
- Dulwich (Old) College (1816)
- Hexham Abbey (1821)
- Apothecaries' Hall, London (1821)
- Althorp Park, Northamptonshire (1825)
- Stansted Park, Sussex (1828)
- Licensed Victuallers' Asylum, Old Kent Road (1829)
- Hursley Park, Hampshire (1830)
- Hanwell Asylum (1831)
- Kent County Asylum (1831)
- Herne Bay Clock Tower (1836)
- St Anne's Church, Limehouse (1839)
- York Minster (1840)
- Kelso Town Hall (1840)
- Devon County Asylum (1845)
- Dufftown Clock Tower (1845)
- Newby Hall, Yorkshire (1846)
- Ordnance Map Office, Southampton (1850)
- Hampshire County Asylum, Fareham (1851)
- Holy Trinity Cathedral, Palayamkottai, India (1854)
- Metropolitan Cattle Market, Islington (1854)
- Essex County Asylum, Brentwood (1854)
- Bromley College (1854)
- Ardross Castle, Highland (1857)
- Ditchley Park, Oxfordshire (1860)
- Fitzroy Memorial Library, Lewes (1862)
- Netley Hospital (1862)
- Bentley Priory (1862)
- Ascot Priory (1862)
- Halifax Town Hall (1863)
- Magdalene College, Cambridge (1863)
- St Peter's Church, Belper (1864)
- Minley Manor, Hampshire (1865)
- Herbert Hospital, Woolwich (1865)
- Hungerford Town Hall (1866)
- Earlswood Asylum (1867 - the gift of B. R. and J Moore Esq.)
- Public Record Office, Chancery Lane (1867)
- Northampton Guildhall (1867)
- Marine Barracks, Plymouth (1867)
- Municipal Buildings, Liverpool (1868)
- New College, Dulwich (1868)
- Eastney Barracks, Portsmouth (1872)
- Girton College, Cambridge (1873)

This is a small representation, omitting numerous other clocks installed in parish churches, stately homes and public buildings across five continents.

== Gallery ==
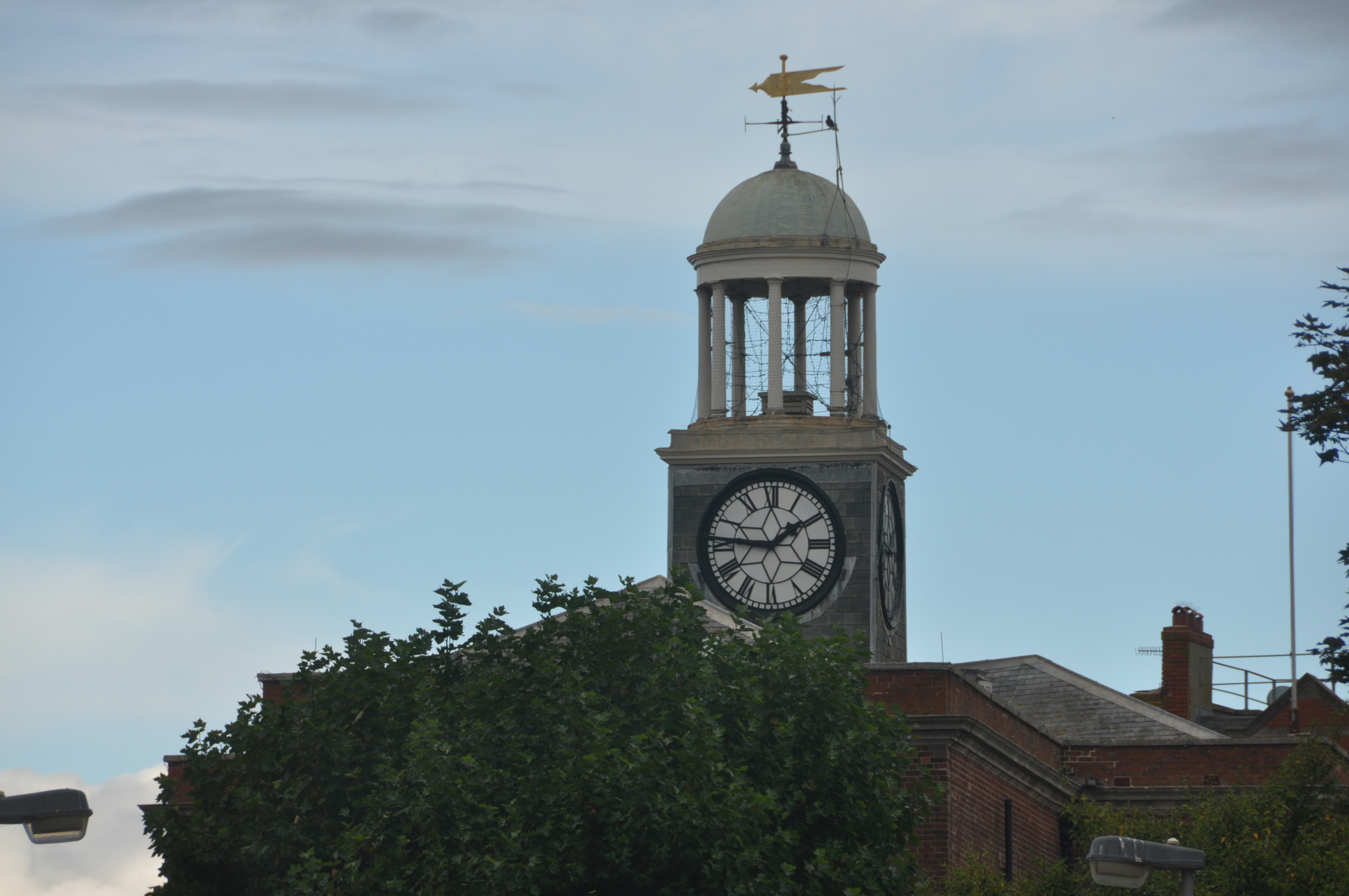
Bridport Town Hall

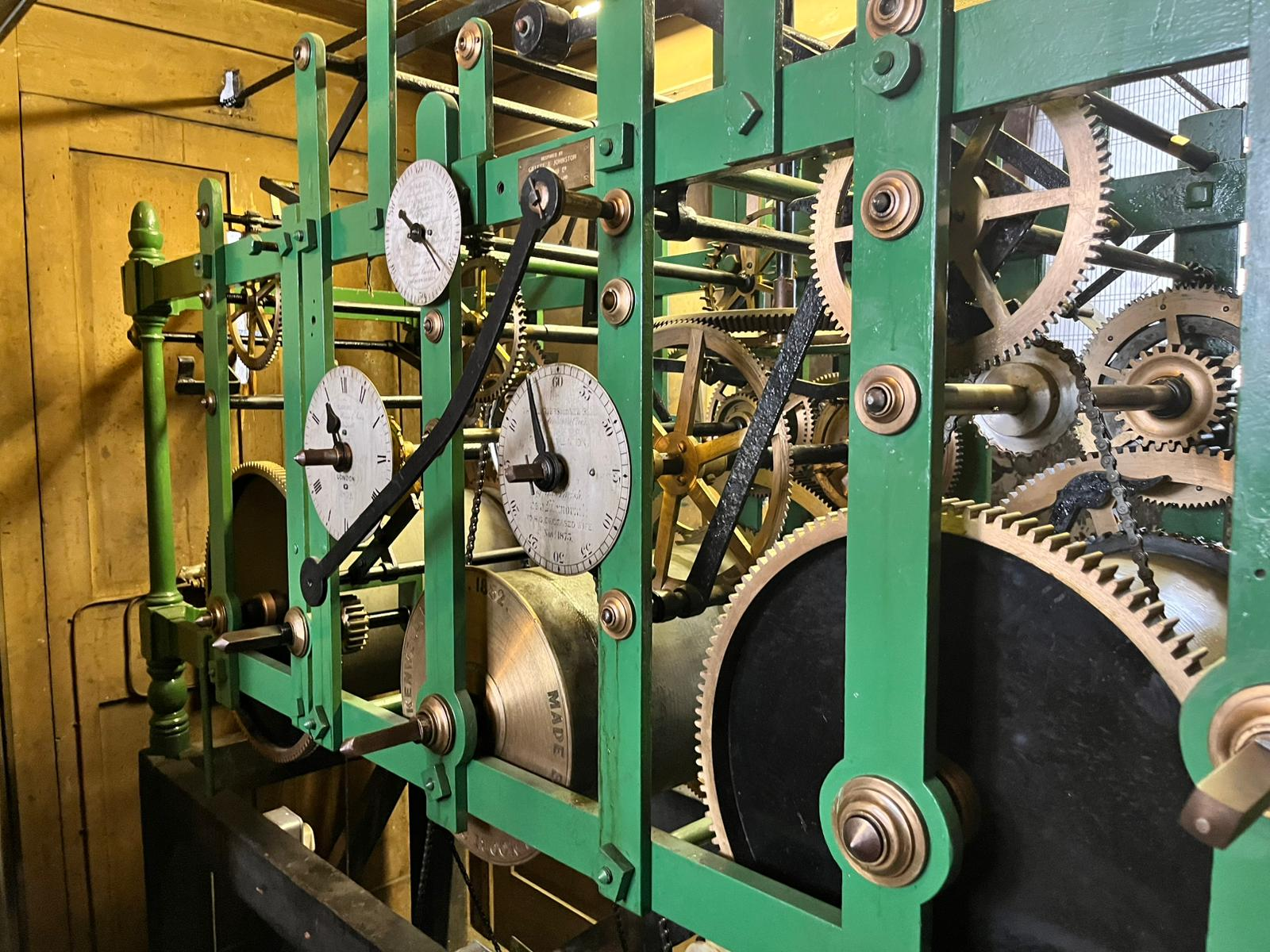
St Anne's Limehouse

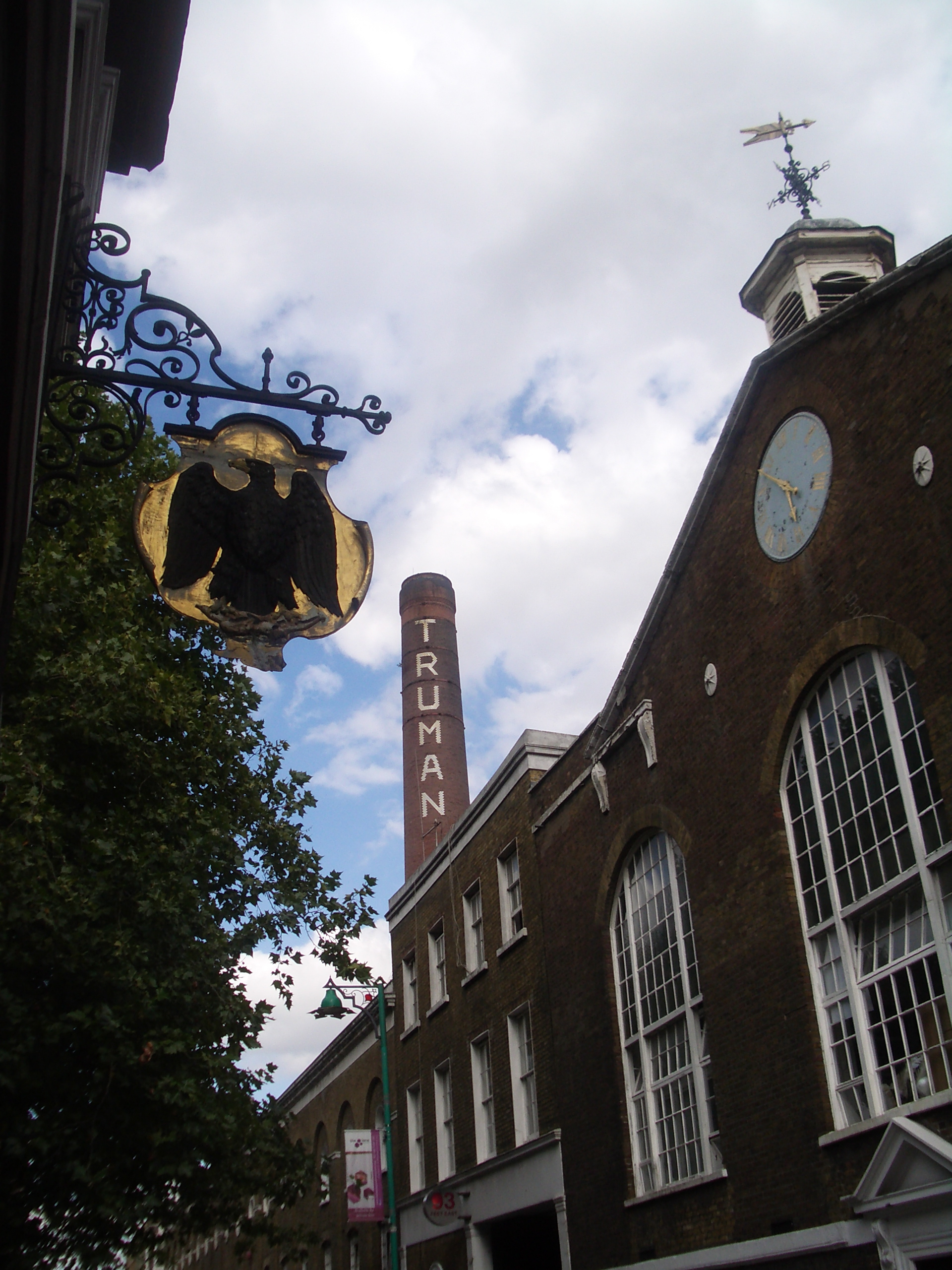
Truman's Brewery

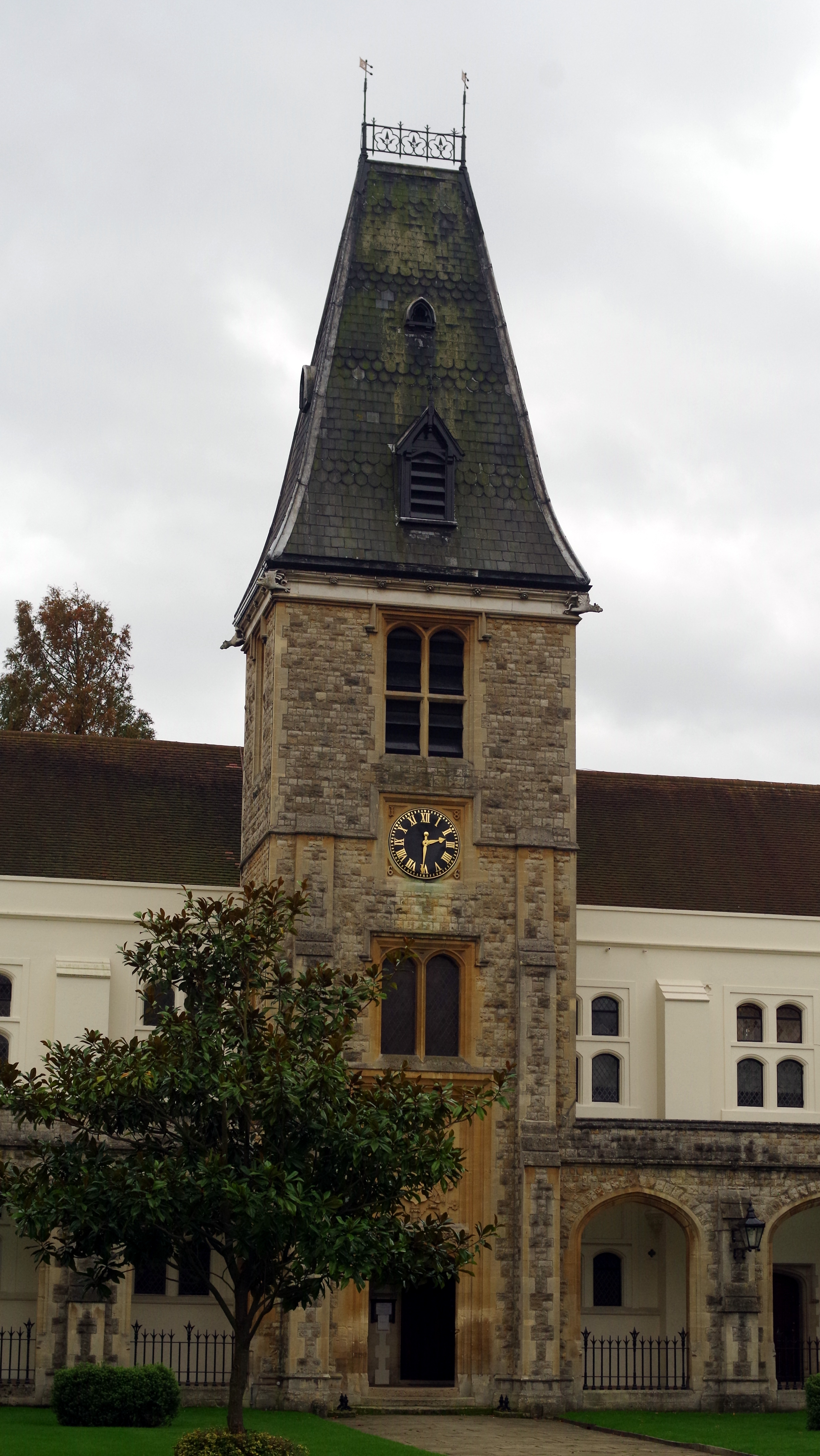
Old (Dulwich) College

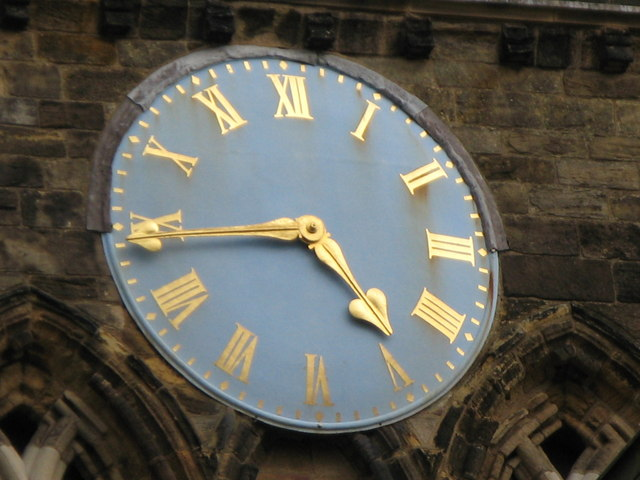
Hexham Abbey

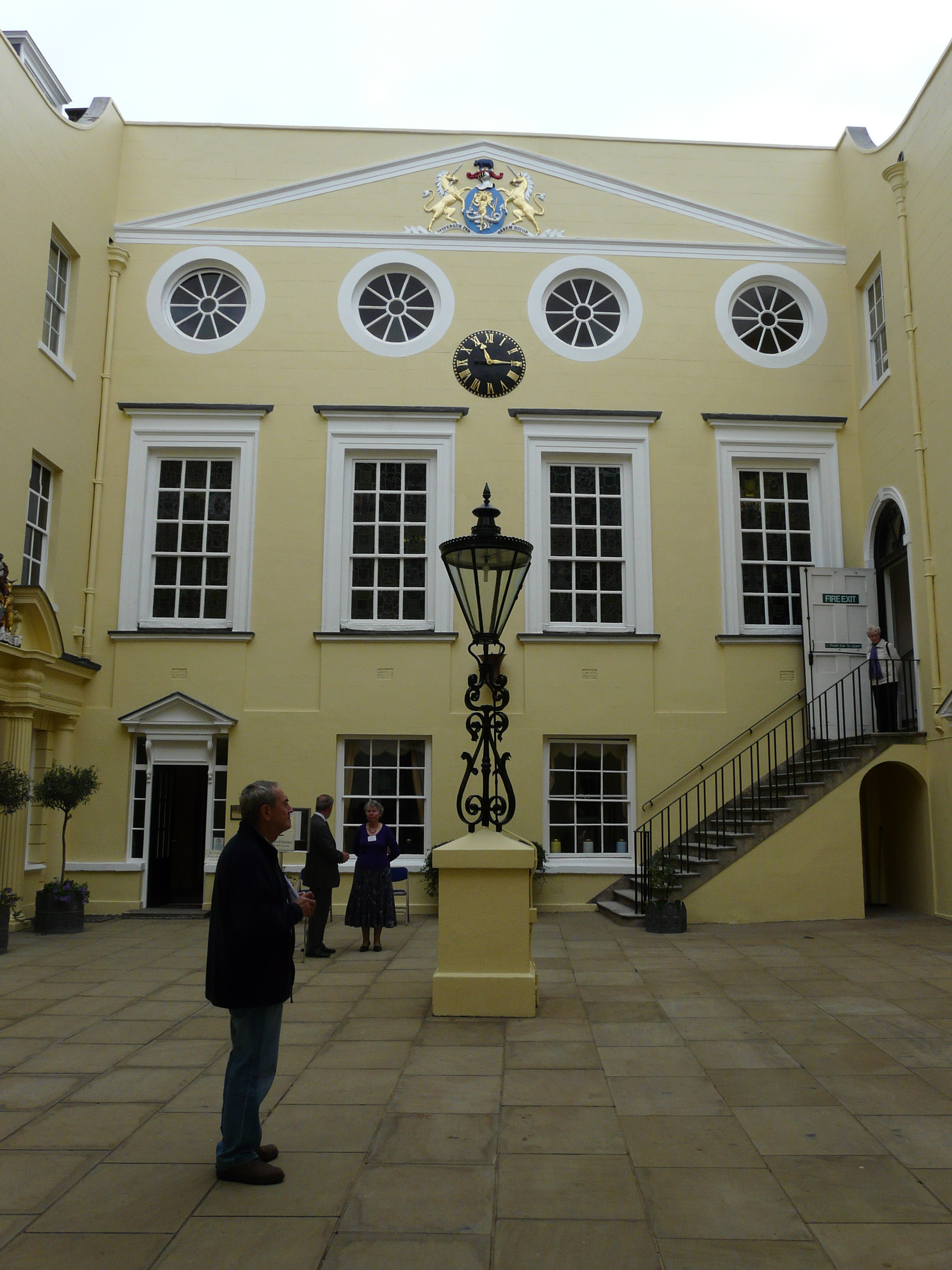
Apothecaries' Hall

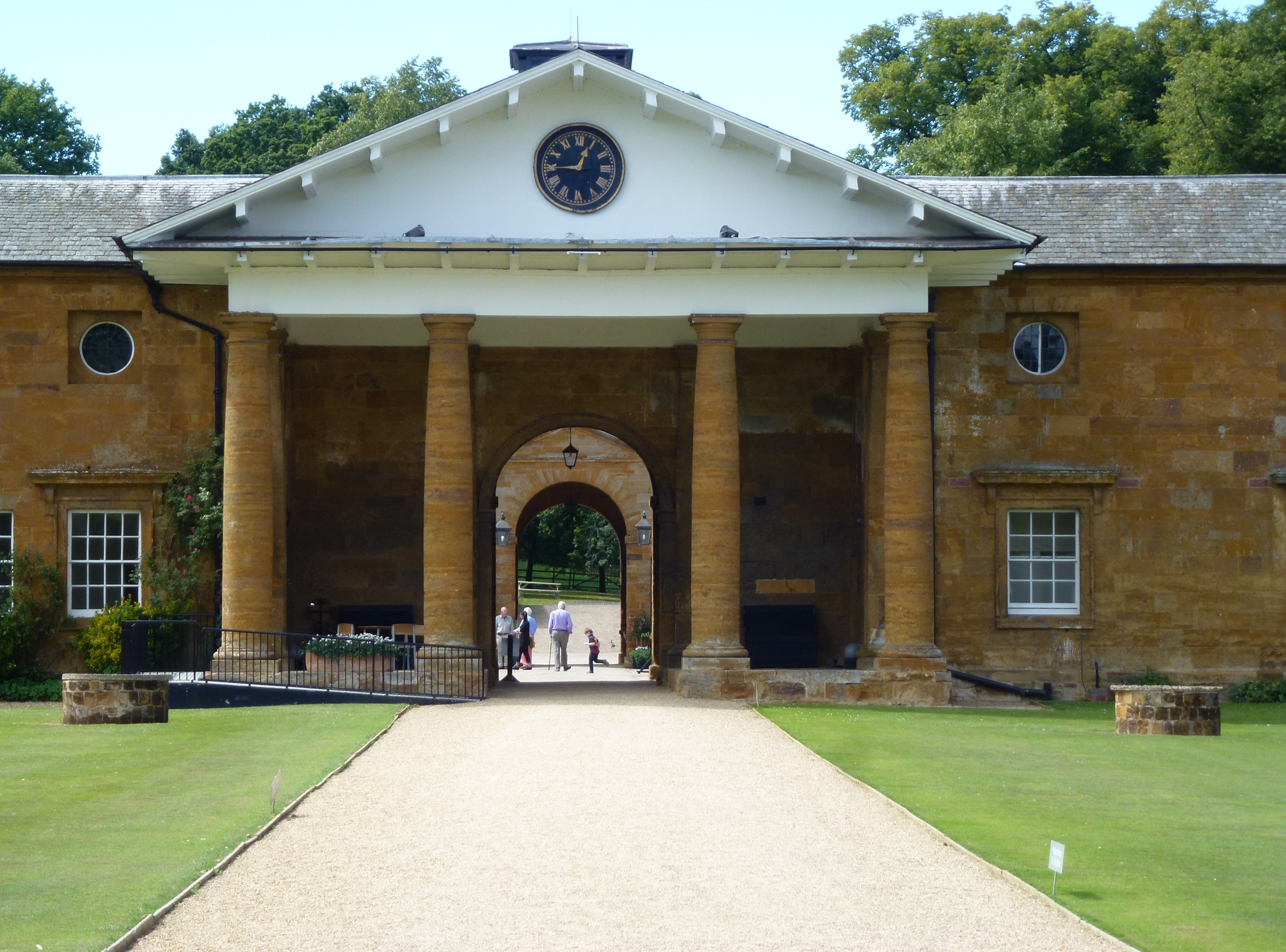
Althorp Park (stable block)

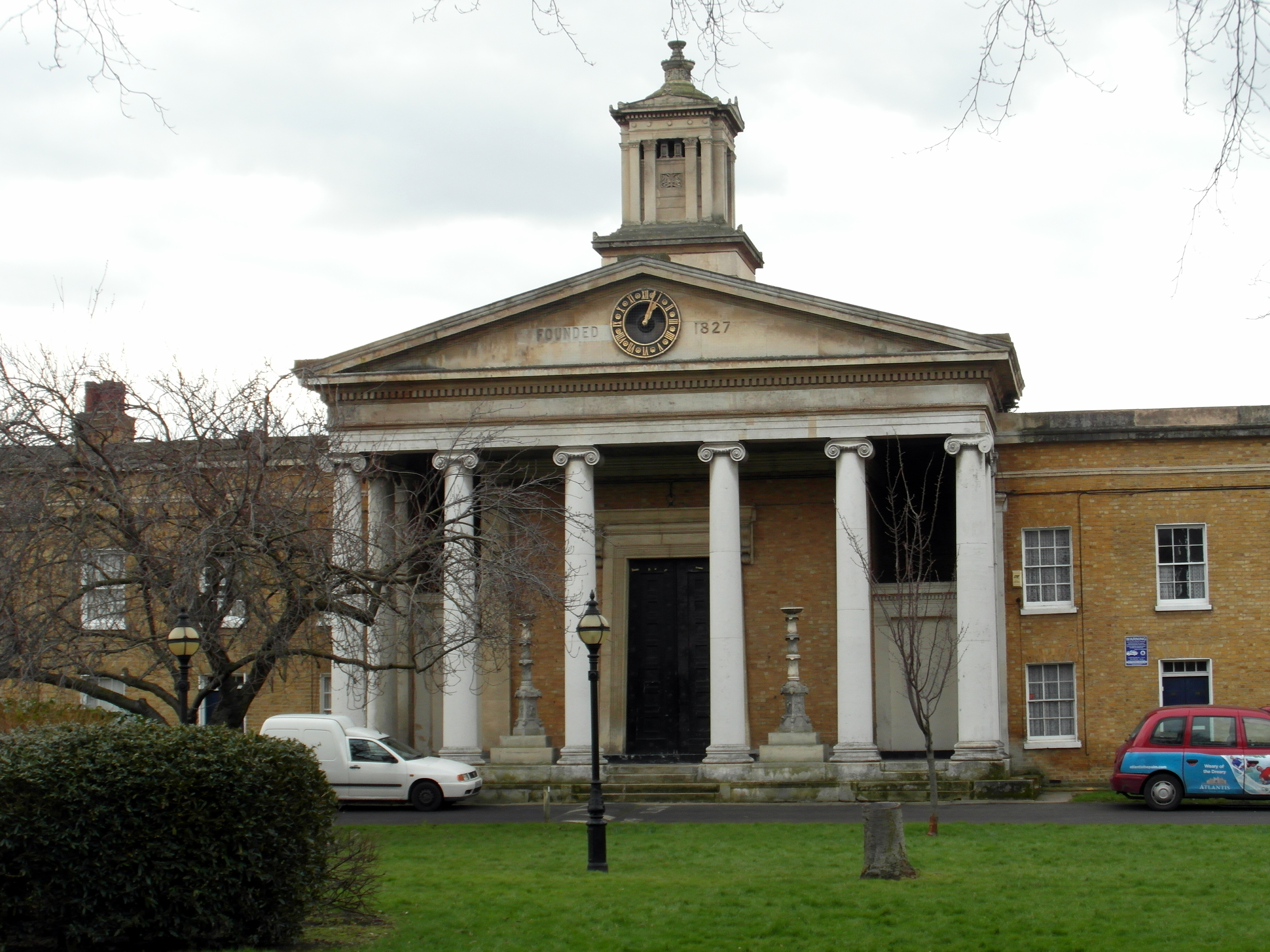
The former Licensed Victuallers' Asylum

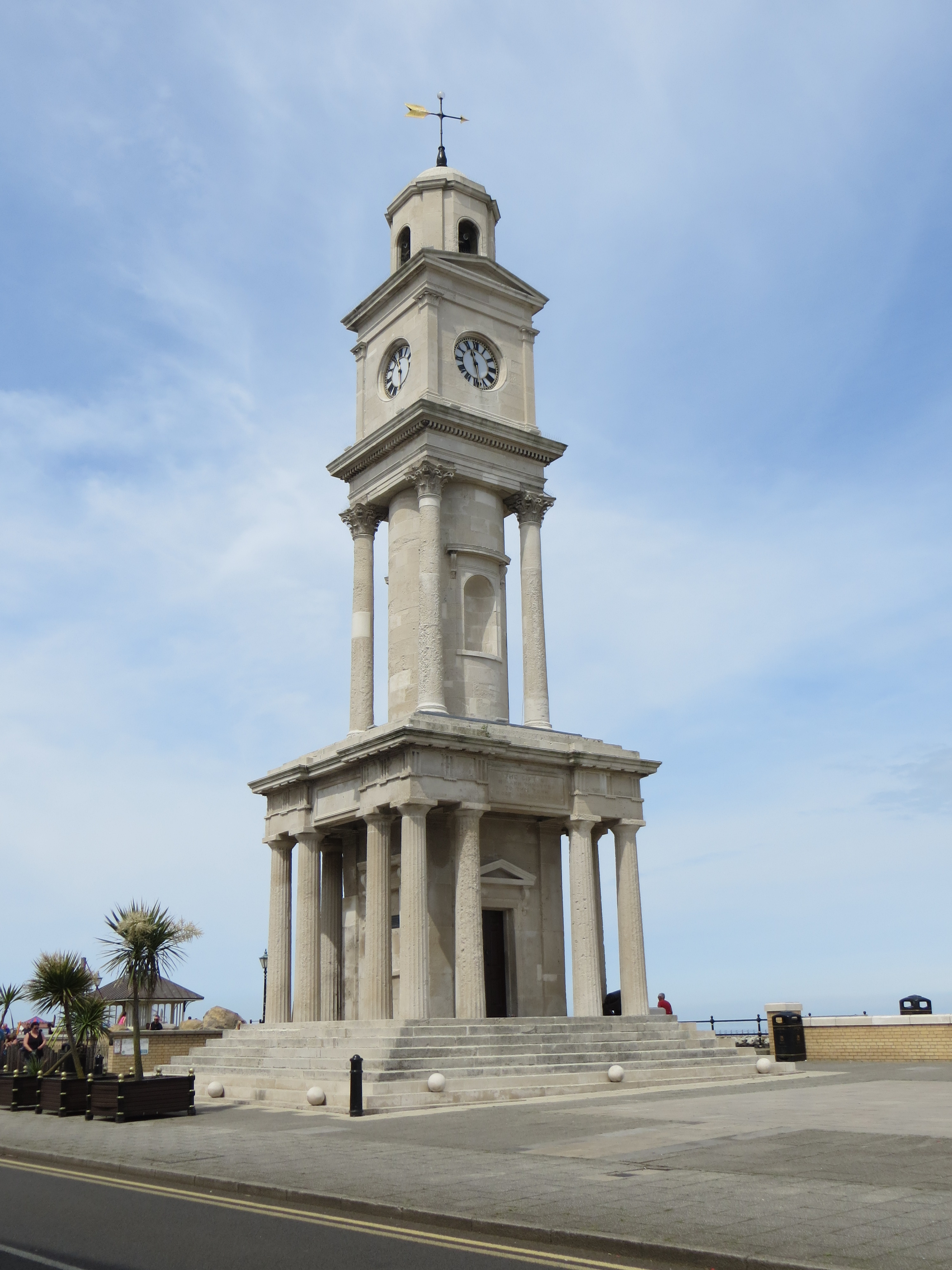
Herne Bay Clock Tower

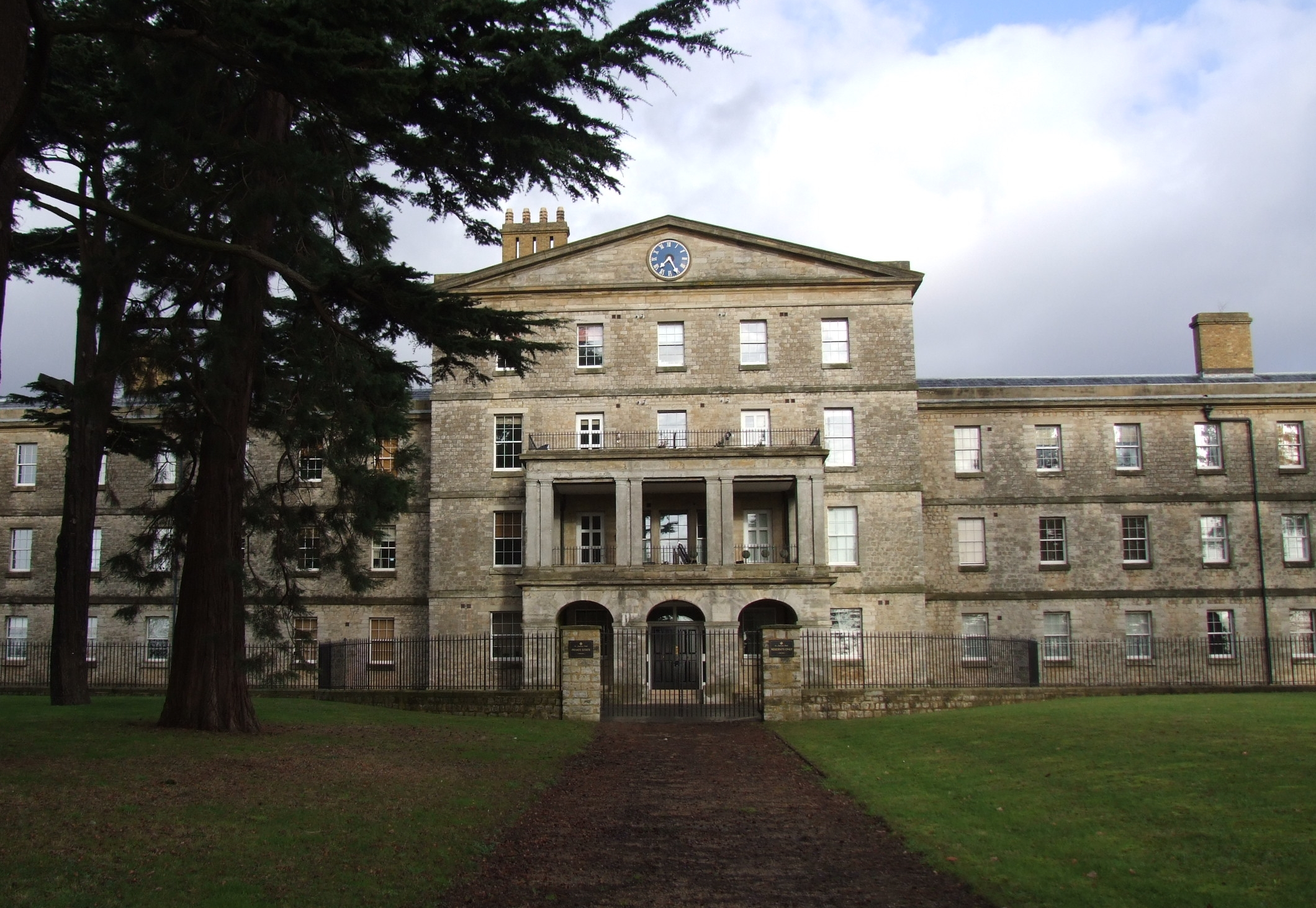
Oakwood Hospital (formerly Kent County Asylum)

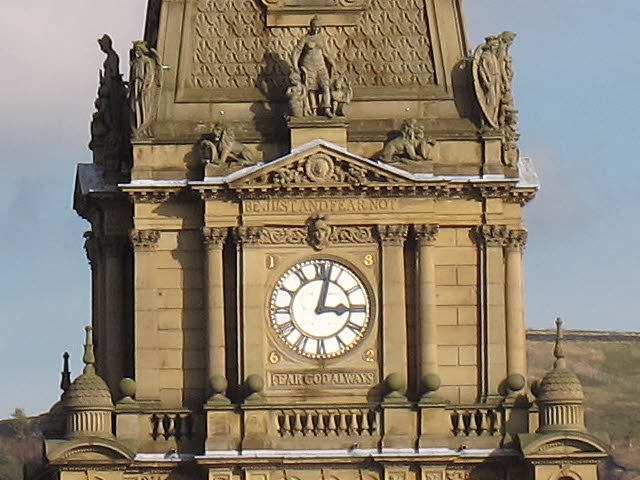
Halifax Town Hall

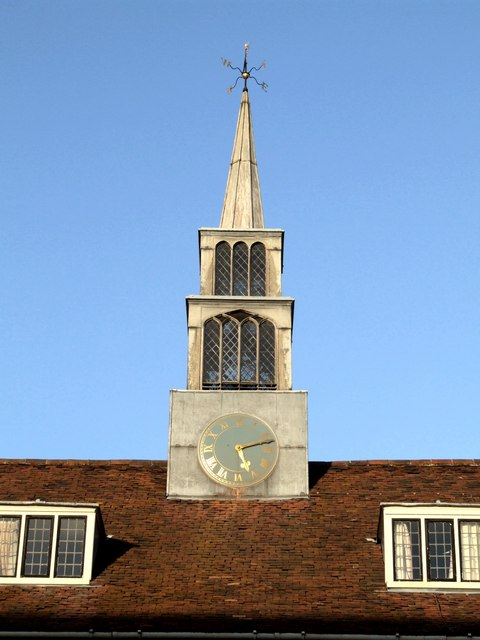
Magdalene College, Cambridge

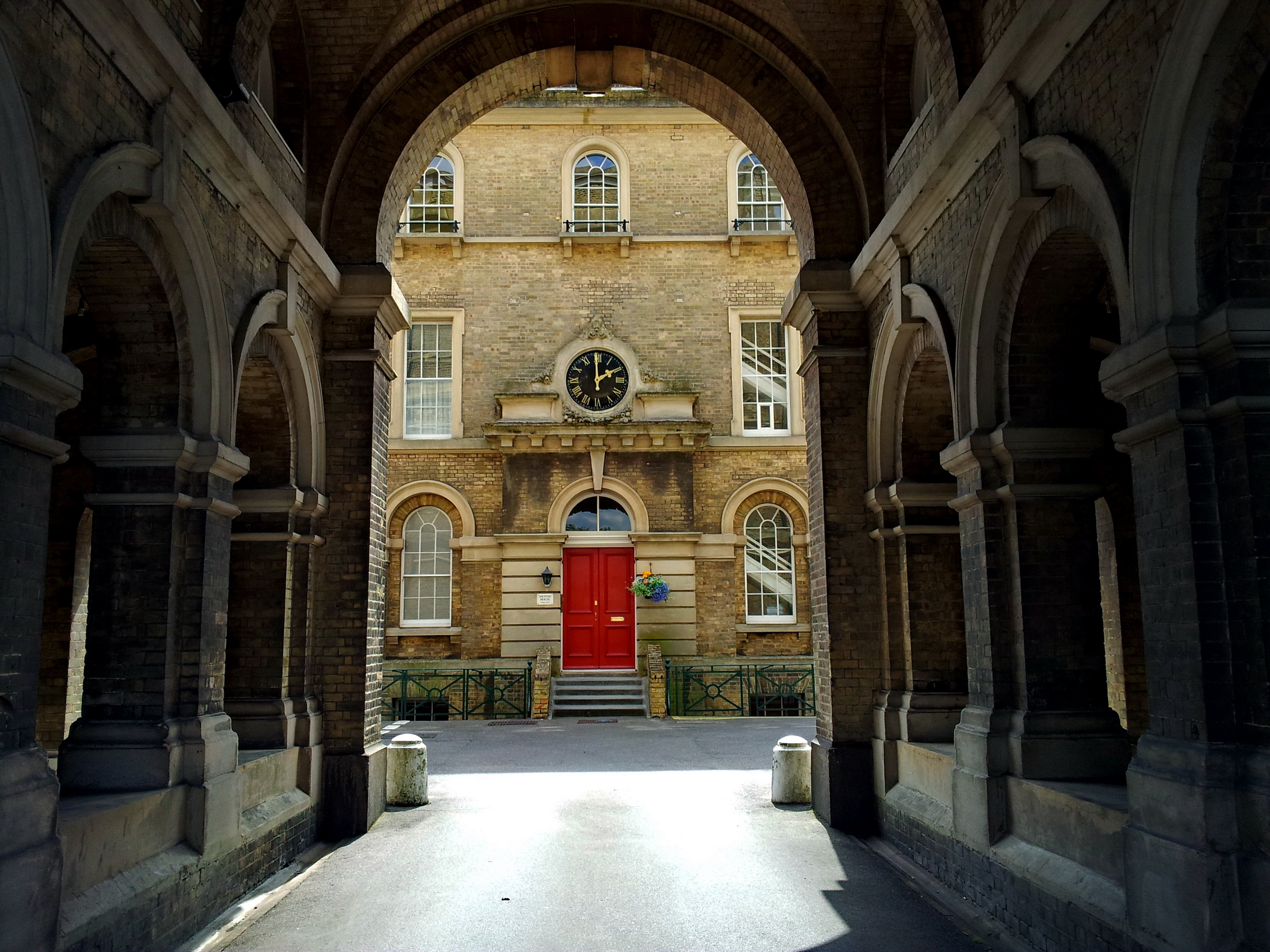
Royal Herbert Hospital

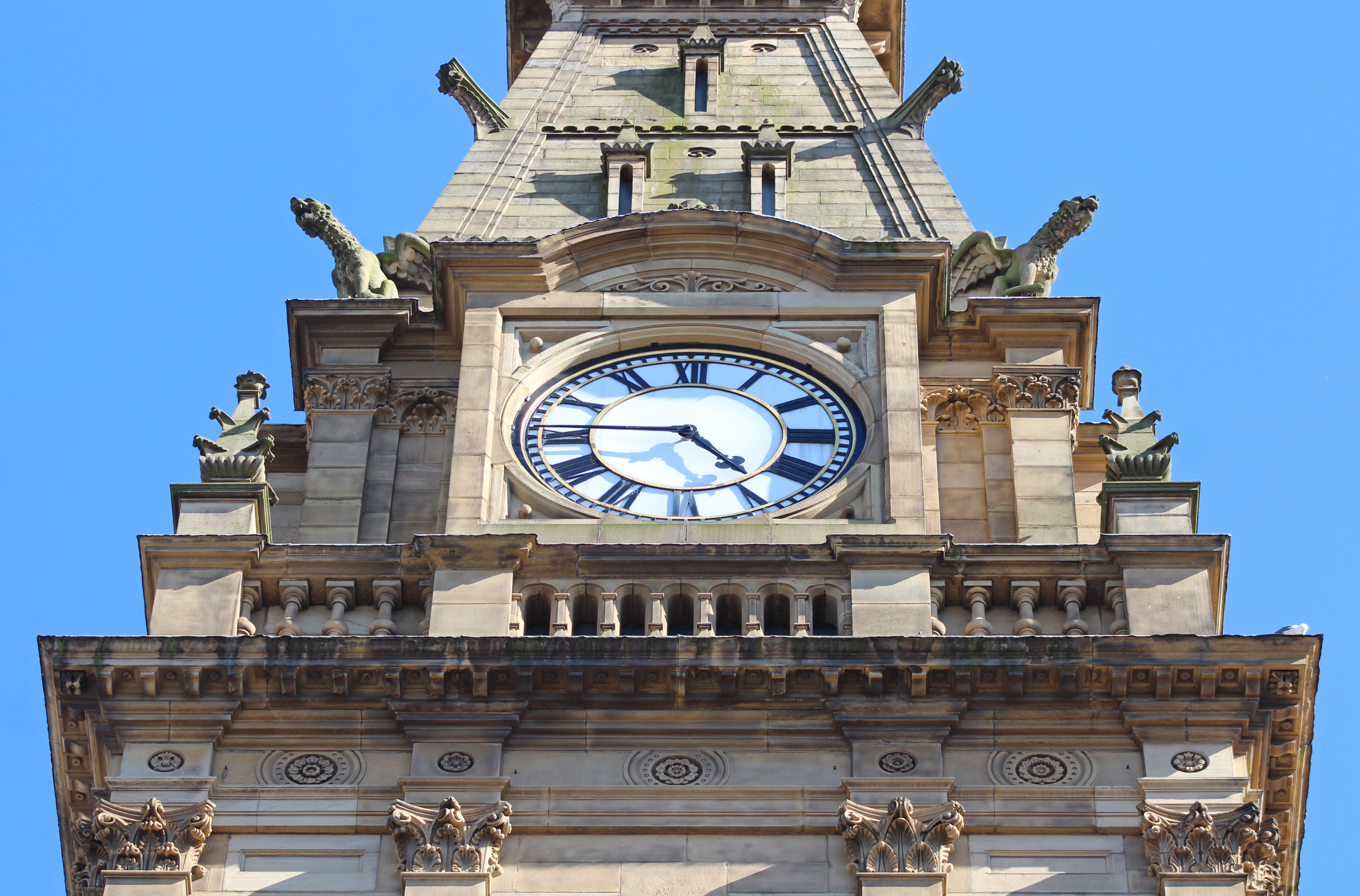
Liverpool Municipal Buildings

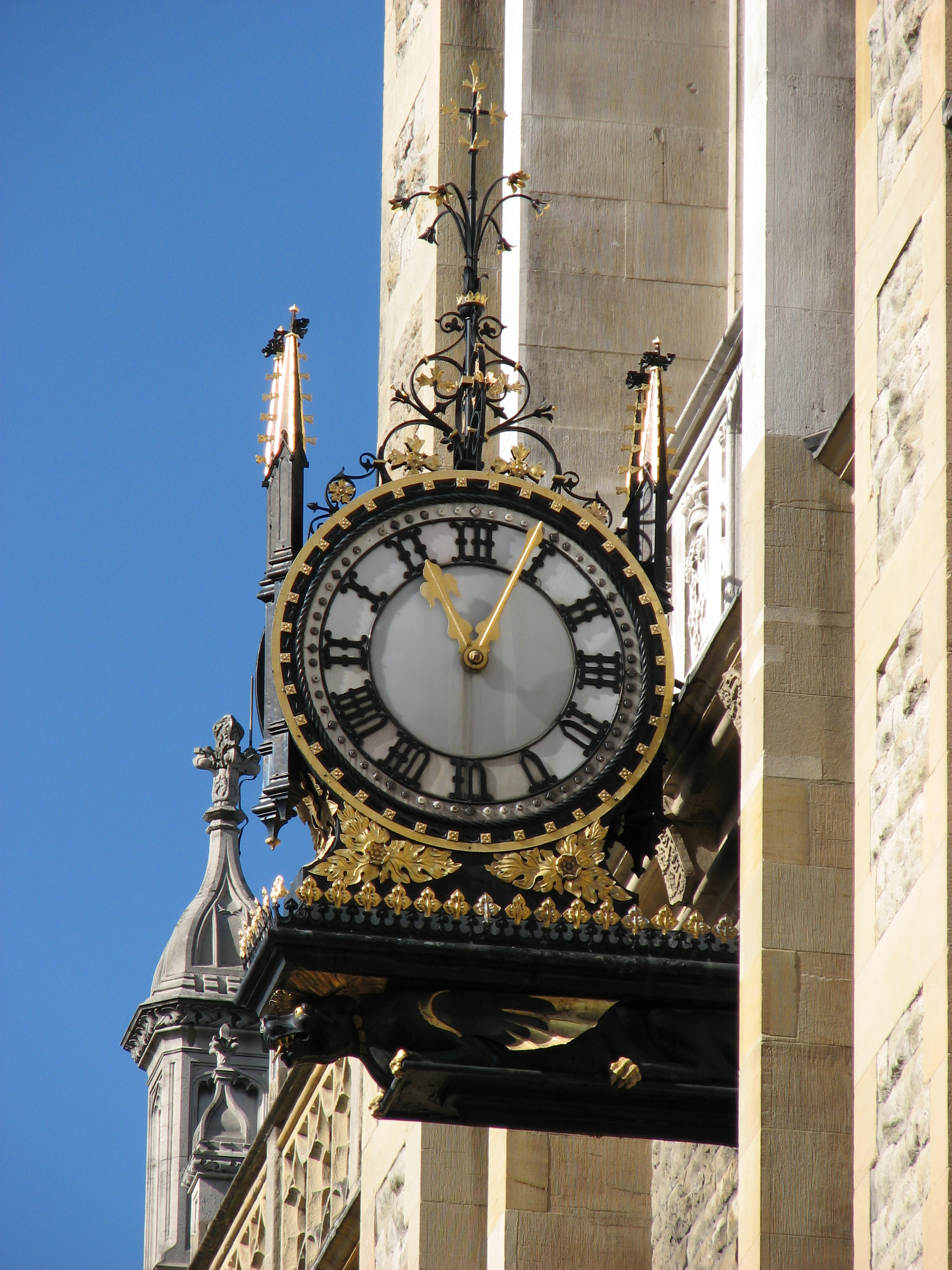
Maughan Library (ex-Public Record Office)

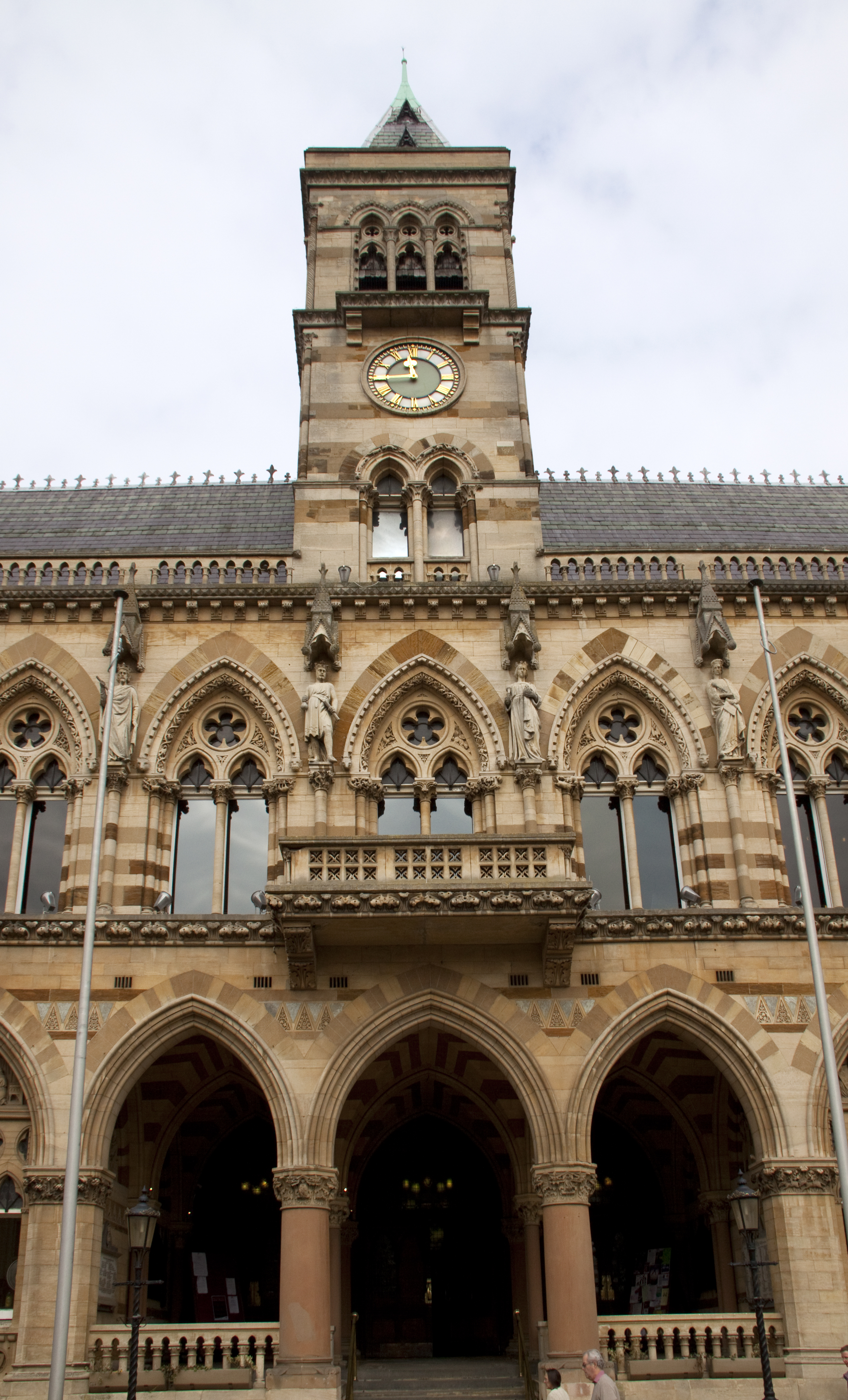
Northampton Guildhall

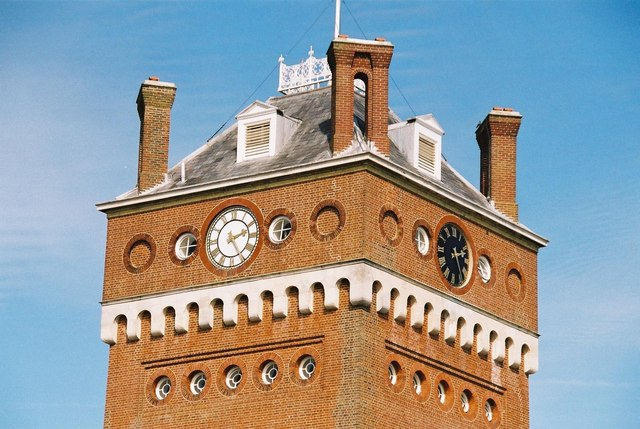
Eastney Barracks

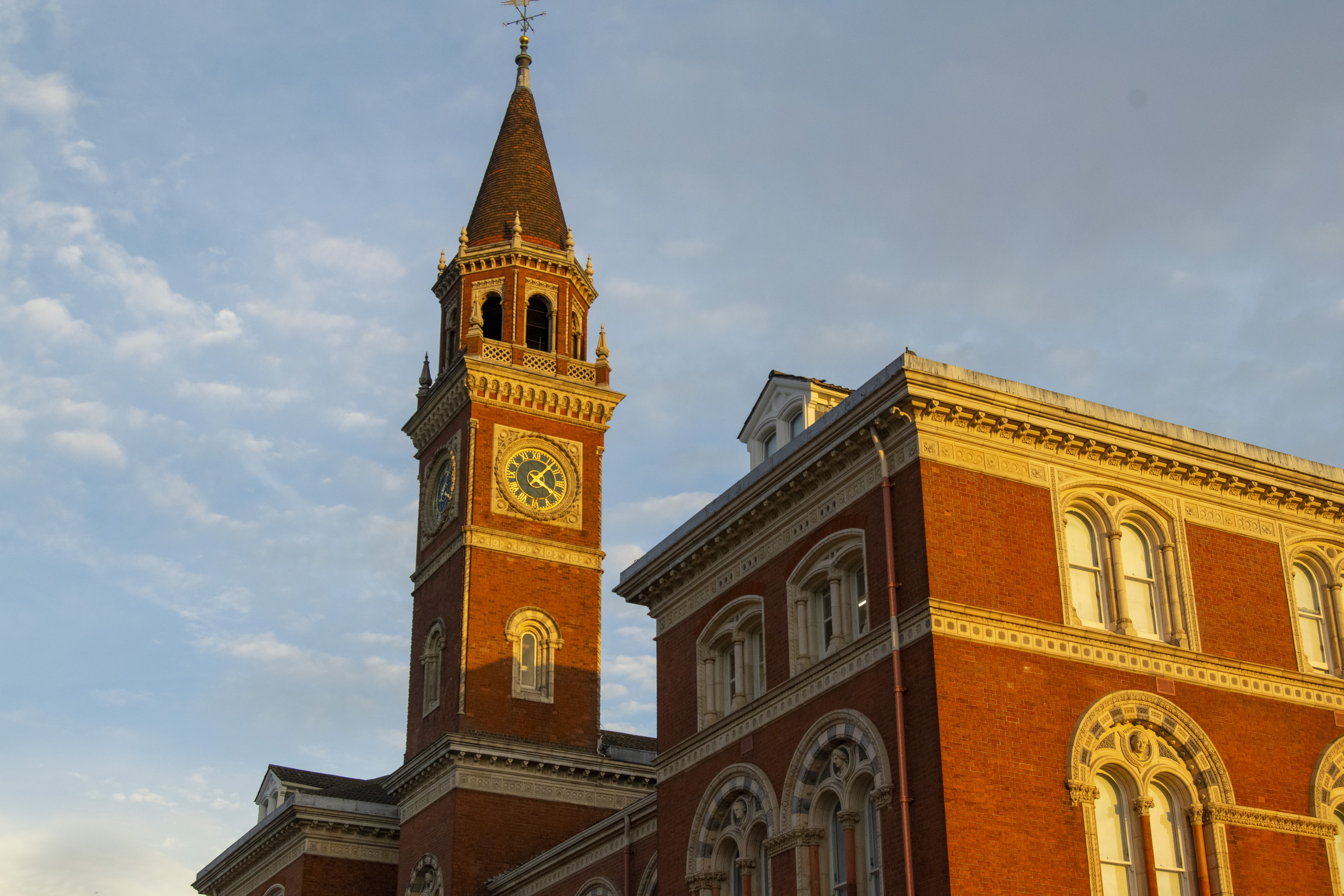
The clock and bell tower at Dulwich College

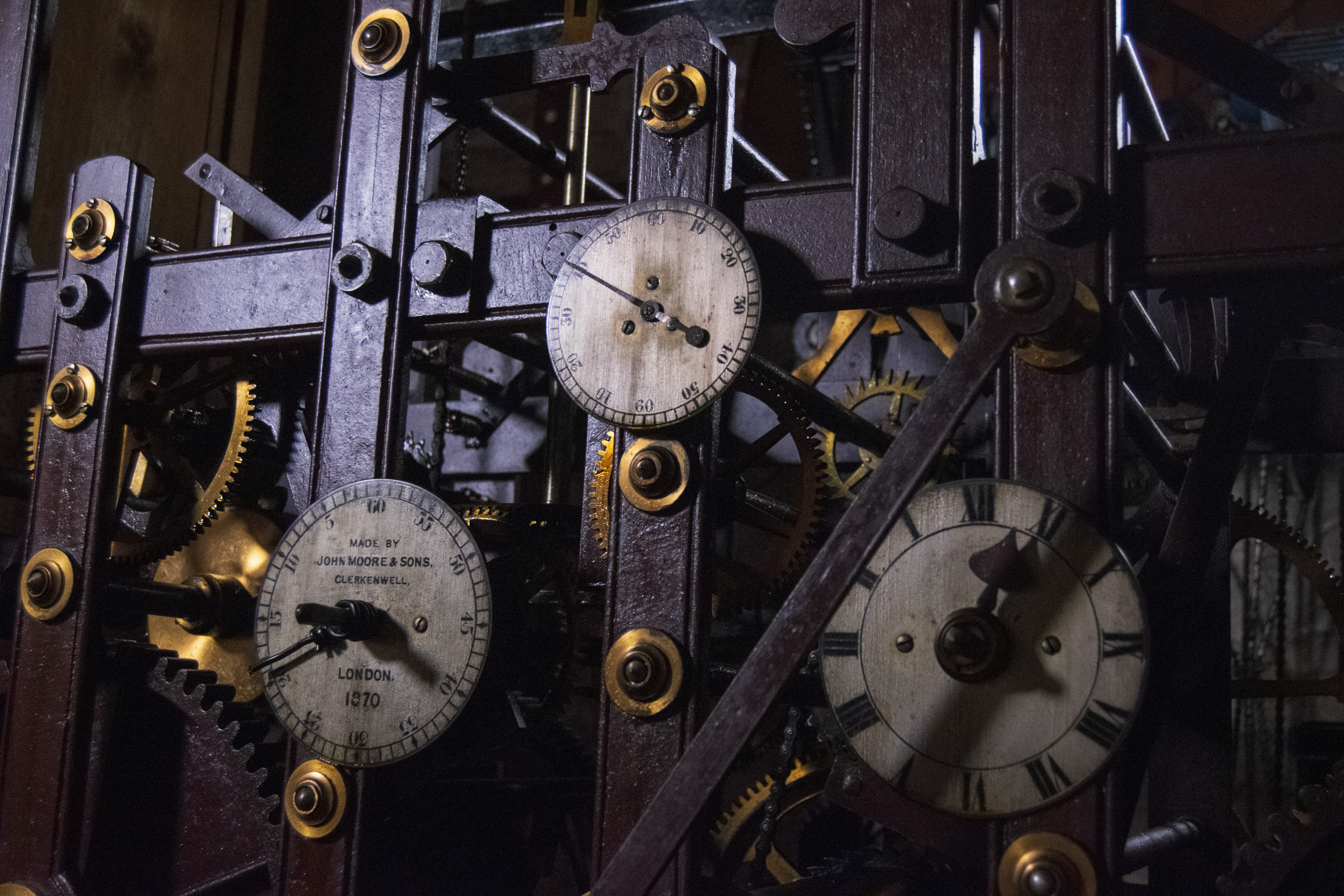
Clockworks in the Dulwich College clock and bell tower
