= Livesey Hall War Memorial =

War memorial in Sydenham, London

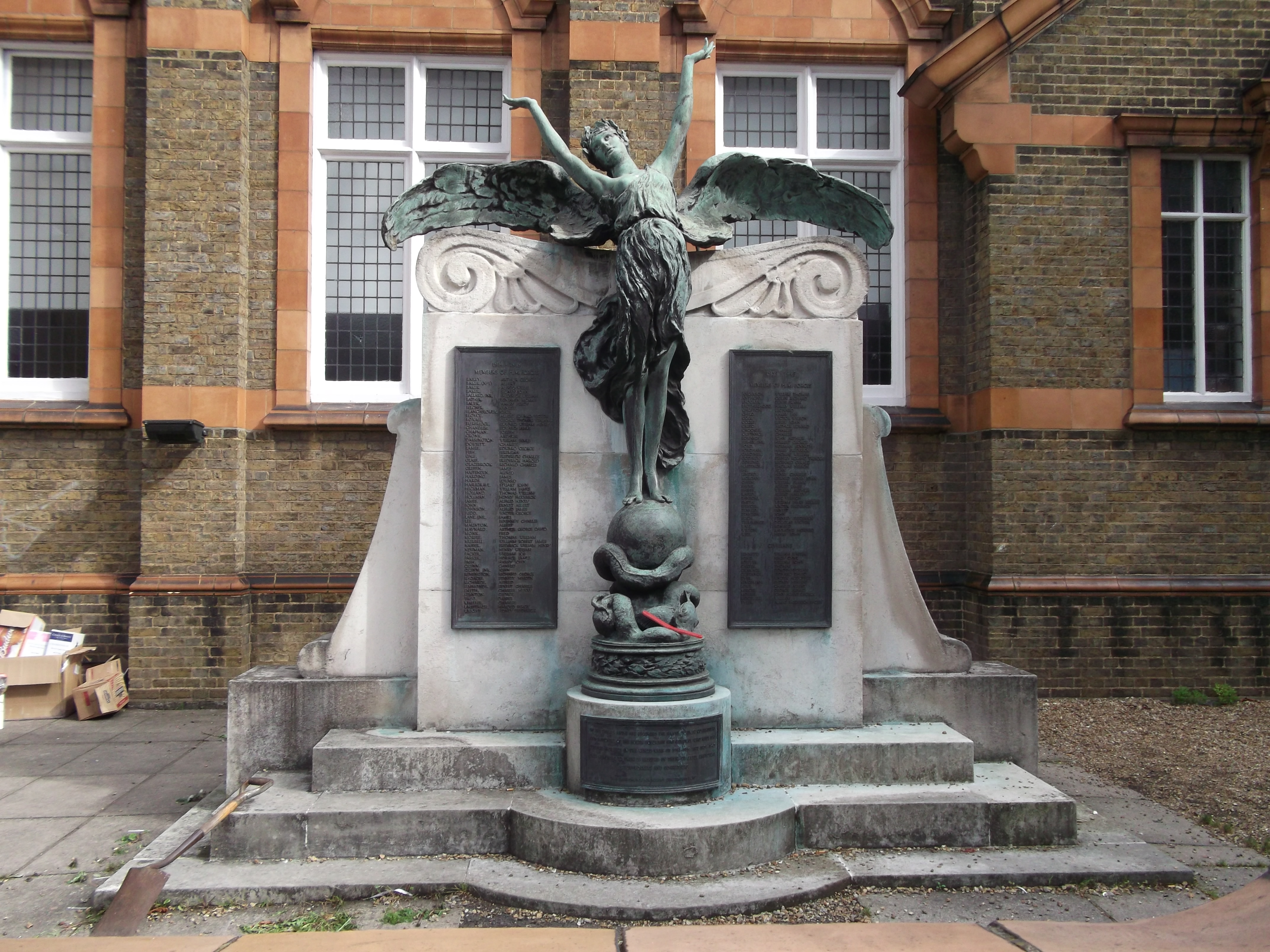
- Livesey Hall War Memorial in the Sydenham area of Lewisham
- Interactive map of Livesey Hall War Memorial
- Location: Lewisham, Greater London, England
- Coordinates: 51°25′53″N 0°2′14″W
- Designer: Sydney March
- Type: Military
- Material: Bronze and Limestone
- Completion date: 1920
- Opening date: 4 June 1920
- Dedicated to: Employees of South Suburban Gas Company who served in World War I and World War II
- National Historic List for England Grade II

The Livesey Hall War Memorial, in Lewisham, Greater London, commemorates the fallen of World War I and World War II who had been employed by the South Suburban Gas Company of London. It is also a tribute to those employees who served in the wars. The monument was designed and executed by the British sculptor Sydney March, of the March family of artists.

== Location ==
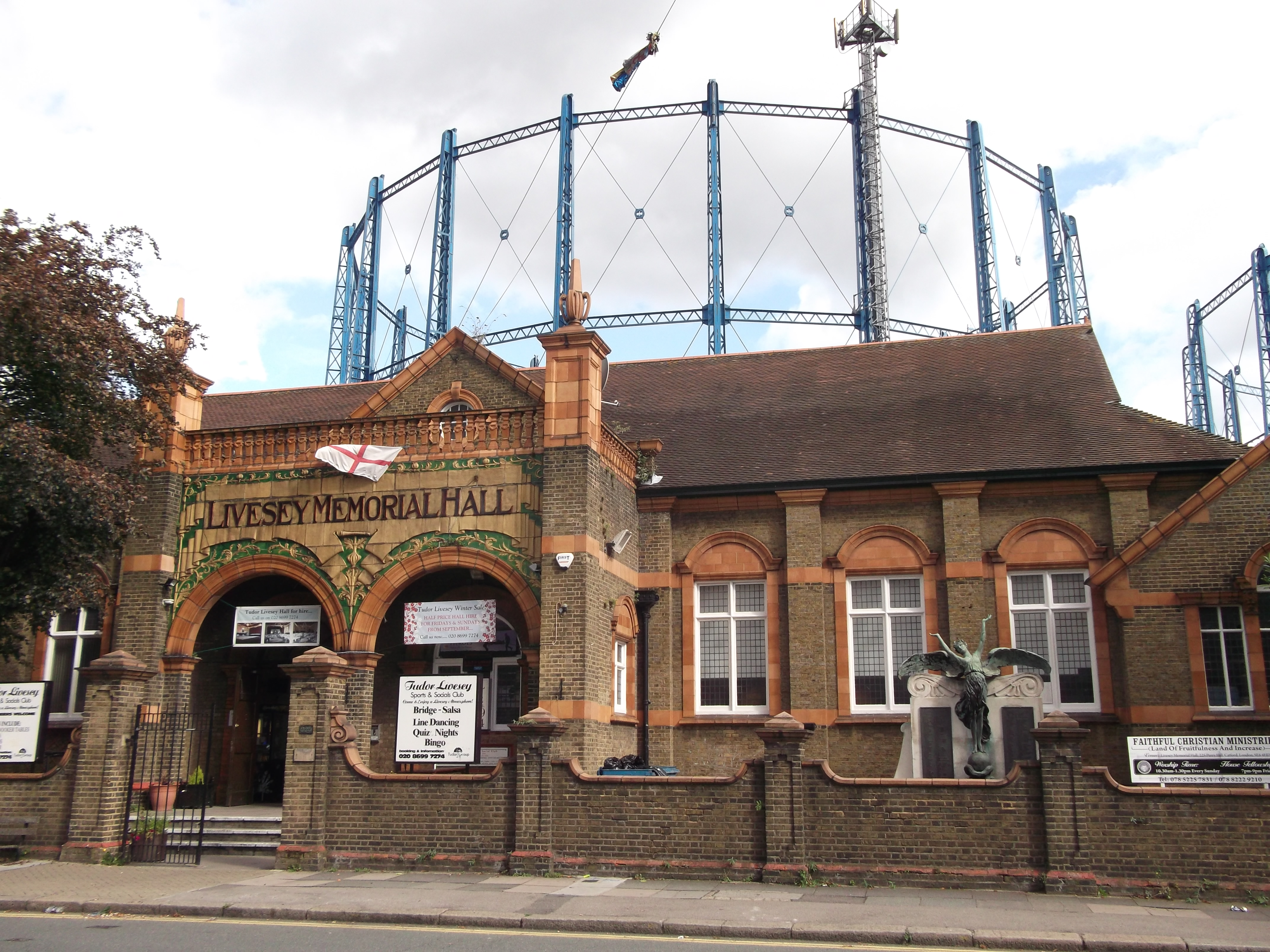
Livesey Memorial Hall in 2011

The Livesey Hall War Memorial is located in the Sydenham area of Lewisham, Greater London, England. The locality is also referred to as Catford. It is positioned on Perry Hill, in the Bell Green neighbourhood, in front of Livesey Memorial Hall. Both structures take their name from the philanthropist Sir George Livesey (1834–1908), former chairman of the South Metropolitan Gas Company, as did the Livesey Museum for Children.

== Design ==
The monument includes a bronze winged female figure with outstretched arms held aloft and wings spread horizontally. The triumphant Victory statue stands on a bronze globe encircled with serpents and set on a bronze wreathed base. This is all set on a semi-circular stone base to which a small bronze plaque was attached. Three steps lead to a backdrop of vertical limestone slabs on which three bronze plaques were affixed, two on the front and one on the back. The inscriptions on the left hand panel on the front and the smaller panel in the centre dedicated the memorial to the partners and employees of the South Suburban Gas Company who died in the two world wars. The inscriptions on the right hand panel on the front listed the names of the fallen. The panel also included a quote from English poet Rupert Brooke: "If I should die, think only this of me: that there's some corner of a foreign field that is forever England. There shall be in that rich earth a richer dust concealed." The bronze plaque on the back of the monument lists the partners and employees of the company who served during World War I.

== Dedication ==
The Livesey Hall War Memorial, sometimes referred to as the Sydenham or Livesey War Memorial, was unveiled by Lord Robert Cecil (1864–1958) on 4 June 1920. The British statesman helped draft the League of Nations Covenant in 1919 and won the Nobel Peace Prize in 1937.

== National Heritage List for England ==
The monument is a listed building. It was added as a Grade II structure on the National Heritage List for England on 25 April 1995. Its listing was amended on 30 August 1996. George Livesey's statue by F. W. Pomeroy is also on the National Heritage List for England as is Livesey Memorial Hall itself.

== Sculptor ==
The Livesey Hall War Memorial was designed and sculpted by the British artist Sydney March. The son of George and Elizabeth March, he was born in 1876 in Stoneferry, a suburb of Hull, East Riding of Yorkshire, England. He was the second of nine children, eight of whom became artists. As a child, Sydney March worked as a monumental sculptor's apprentice. Later, he attended the Royal Academy Schools, where he won first prize in 1900. March exhibited thirteen times at The Exhibition of the Royal Academy of Arts between 1906 and 1932. His family established studios at their home of Goddendene in Farnborough, Kent after 1901. Sydney March was a prolific artist whose primary focus was war memorials, as well as sculptures of British royalty and other contemporary figures.

He and his siblings completed the National War Memorial of Canada after the 1930 death of their brother, sculptor Vernon March. Other monuments for which he is renowned include the Royal Inniskilling Fusiliers South African War Memorial in Northern Ireland, the United Empire Loyalist Monument in Canada, and the Lancaster Monument in England. Smaller-scale pieces include the portrait busts of King Edward VII and Cecil John Rhodes, both in the National Portrait Gallery in London. Sydney March died in 1968 at the age of 92. His ashes were interred in the family plot at St Giles the Abbot Churchyard in Farnborough. In 1922, Sydney had sculpted the bronze angel monument that marks the March plot.

== Theft of plaques ==
In October 2011, the three bronze plaques from the front of the monument were stolen. Police in the Greater London area reported in late 2011 that incidents of metal theft began about 2006, and had increased since then. Thieves were not only stealing memorial plaques from monuments and cemeteries, but also other sources of metal such as roofs, manhole covers, and railway cable.

== See also ==
- Sydney March
- Elsie March
- Vernon March
