= Livezey =

Livezey is a surname. Notable people with the surname include:

- Bradley C. Livezey (1954–2011), American ornithologist
- Jon Harlan Livezey (1938–2025), American politician and lawyer from Maryland

== See also ==
- Livezey House
- Livesey (surname)
