= Bell Green, London =

Coordinates: 51°25′50″N 0°02′15″W

Bell Green
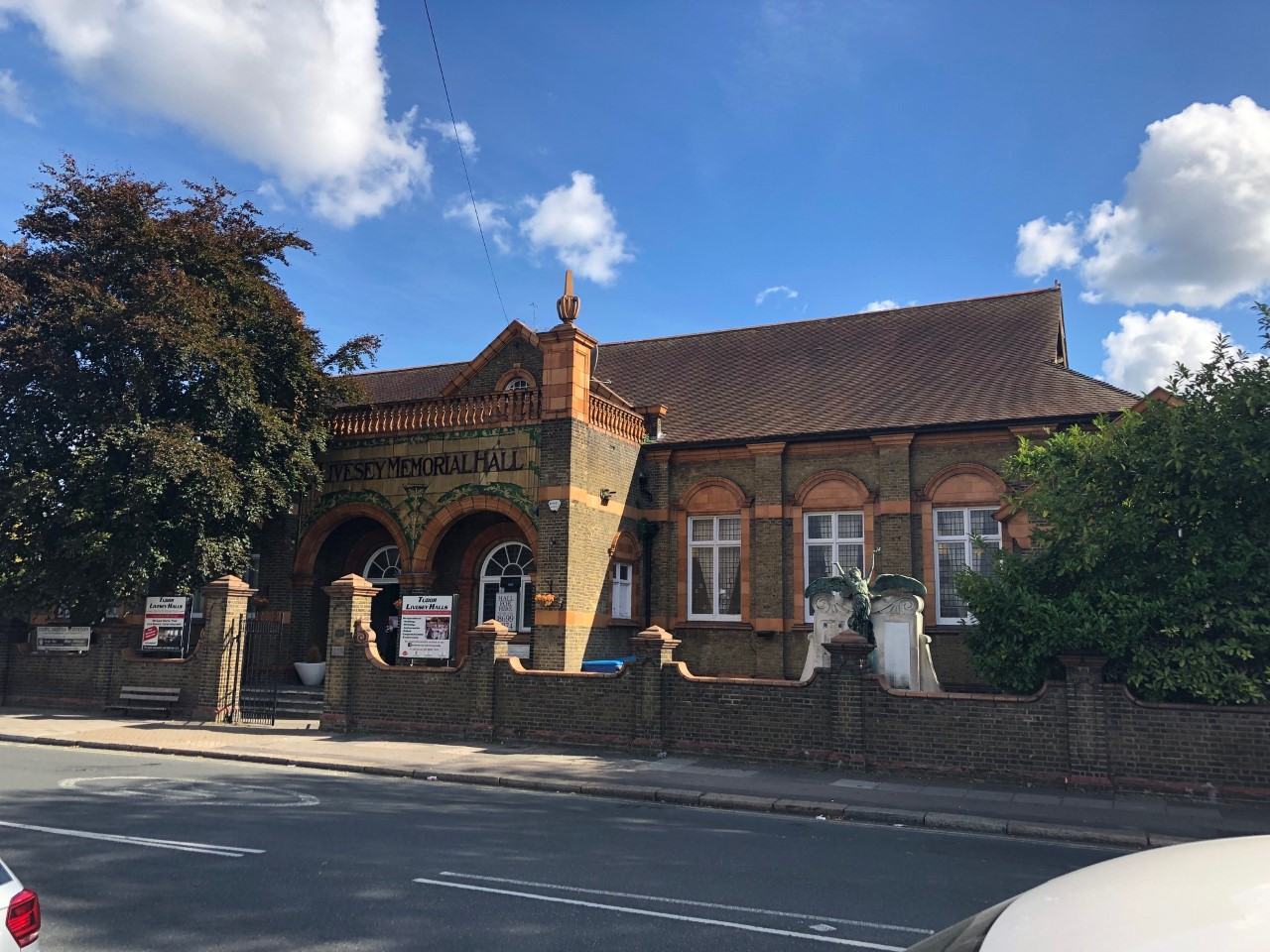
- Livesey Memorial Hall, including Livesey Hall War Memorial

- Location within Greater London
- London borough: Lewisham
- Ceremonial county: Greater London
- Region: London
- Country: England
- Sovereign state: United Kingdom
- Postcode district: SE6/SE26
- Dialling code: 020
- Police: Metropolitan
- Fire: London
- Ambulance: London
- London Assembly: Greenwich and Lewisham

Bell Green is an area in the London Borough of Lewisham, between Perry Vale and Bellingham. The area was historically known for its gas works and the poverty of the local workers, in what Charles Booth called "the one really poor district in this quarter of London." The gasworks closed in 1968 and the whole area redeveloped; it is best known today for the eponymous retail park.

A map from 1870 shows that Bell Green was predominantly a rural area with a small settlement surrounding a road junction.

== Gallery ==
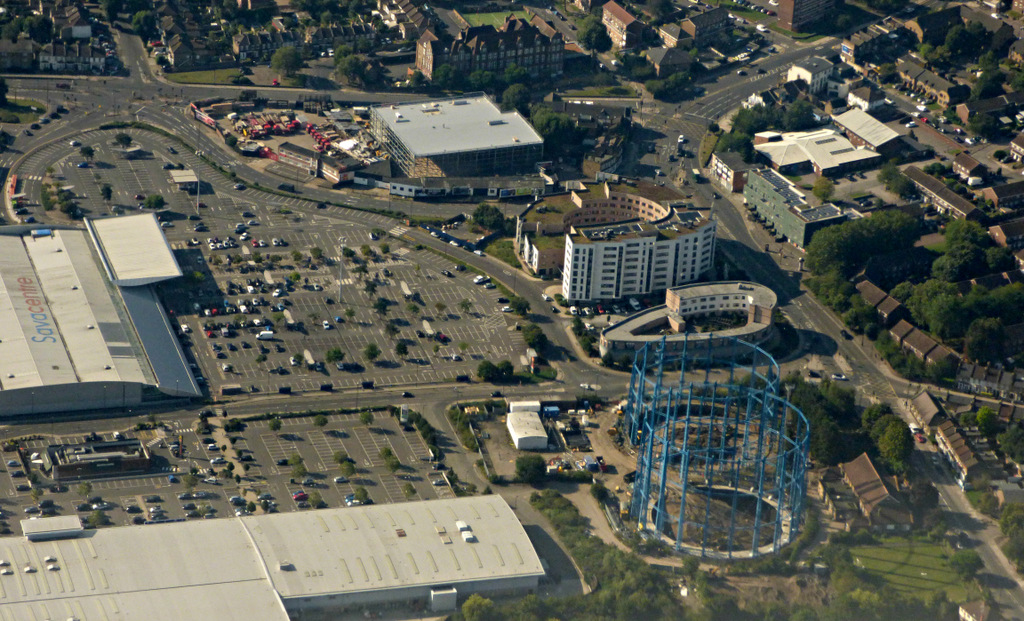
Bell Green Retail Park from the air, including now-demolished gasholders

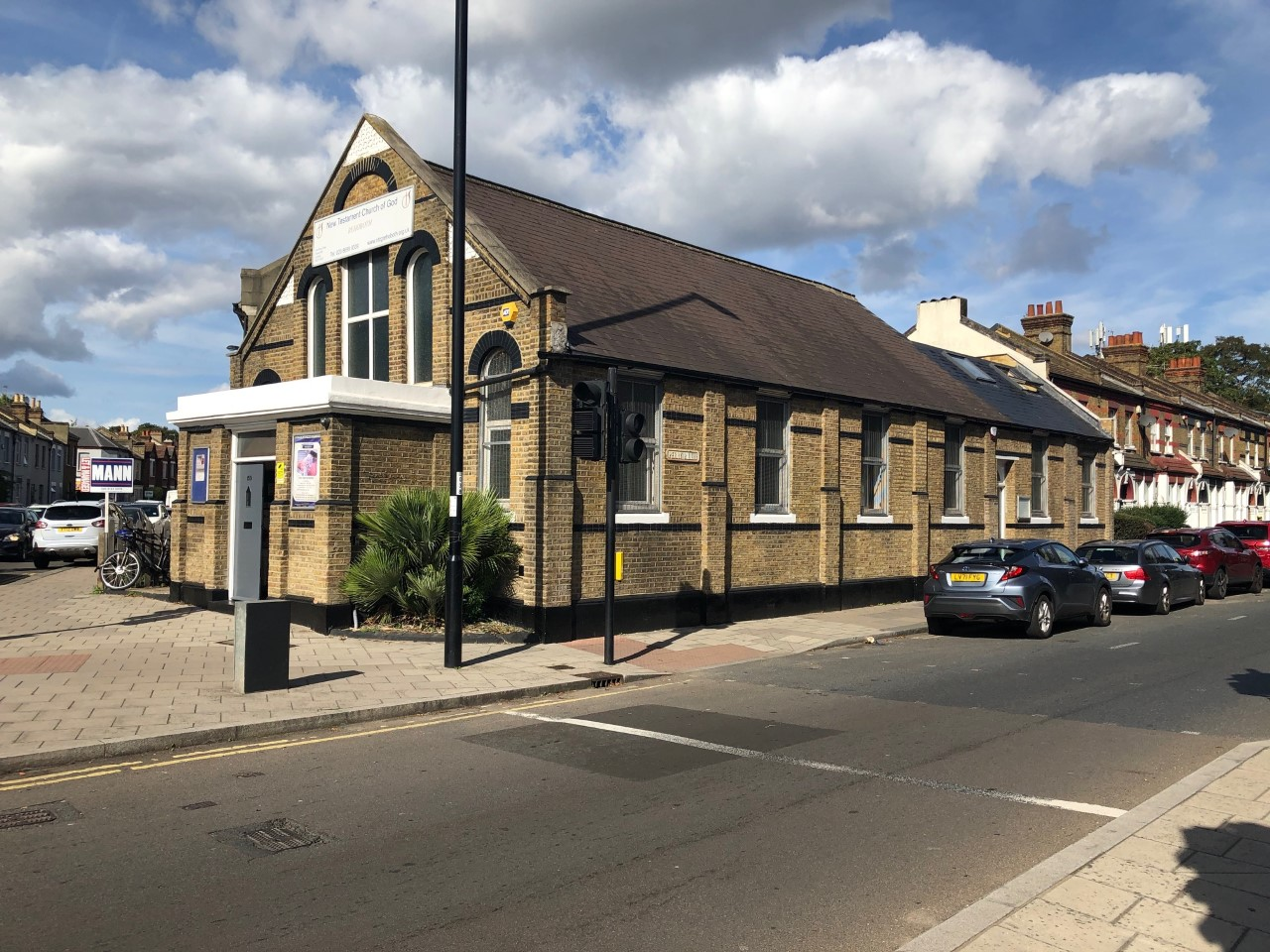
Church at 159 Perry Rise at junction with Bell Green

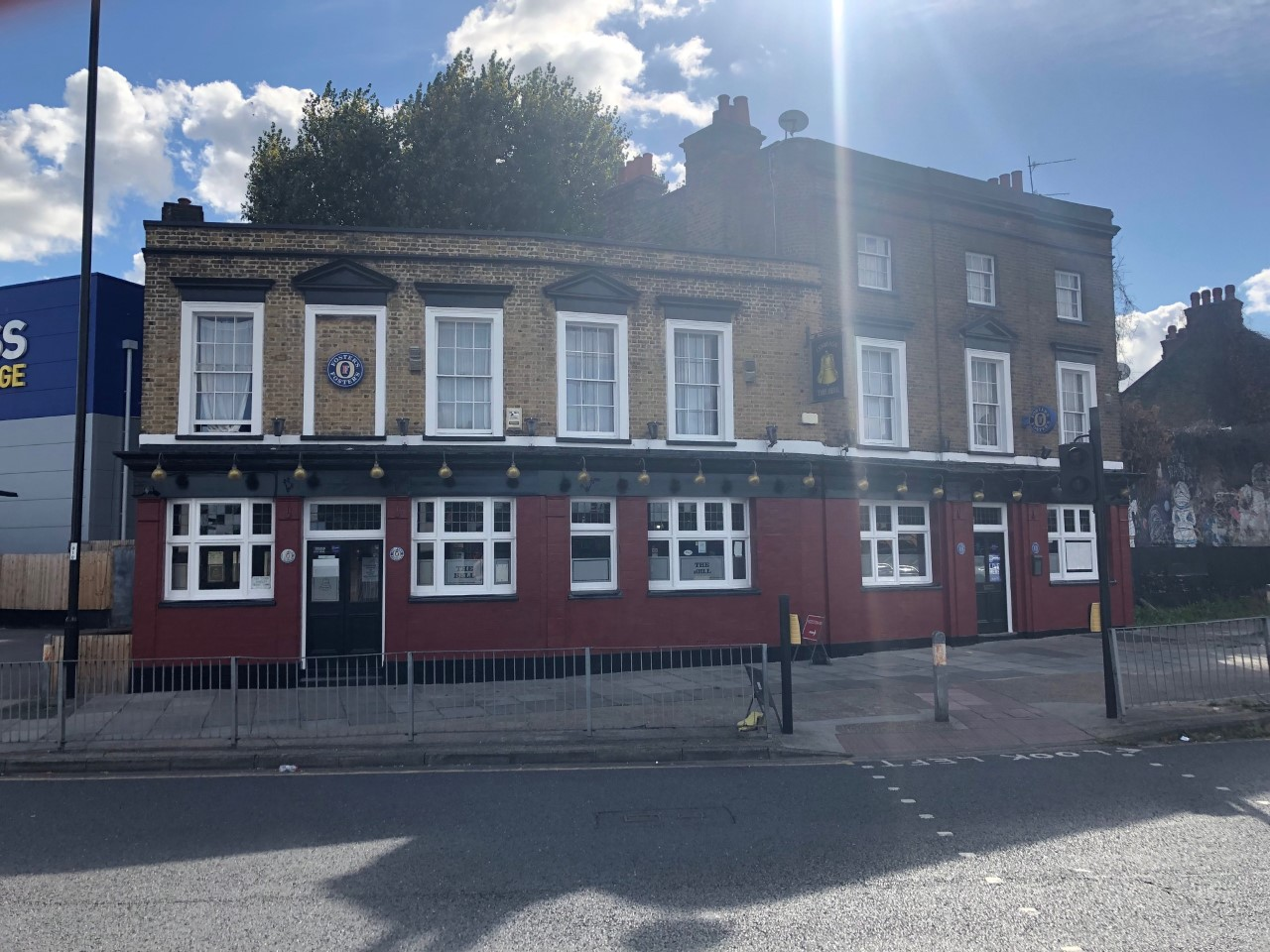
The Bell Pub, Bell Green

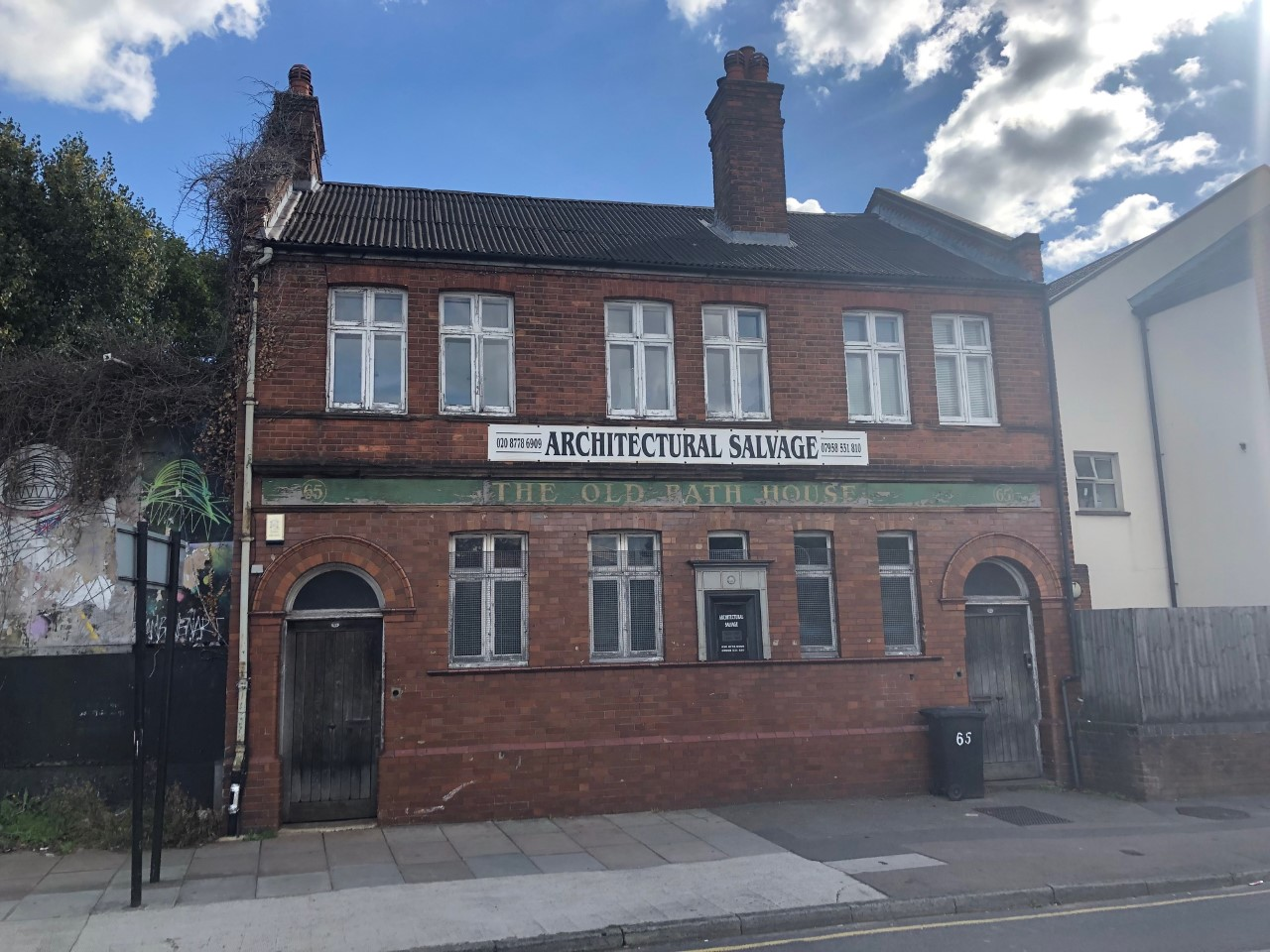
The Old Bath House, Bell Green
