= Livsey =

Livsey is a surname. Notable people with the surname include:

- Billy Livsey, American songwriter, keyboardist, and producer
- Gordon Livsey (1947–2026), English footballer
- Richard Livsey, Baron Livsey of Talgarth CBE (1935–2010), British politician
- Walter Livsey (1893–1978), English cricketer
- Wesley Livsey Jones (1863–1932), American politician
- William J. Livsey, retired United States Army four-star general

== See also ==
- Livesey (surname), people with this name
