= Livesey Museum for Children =

Former museum in Southwark

Coordinates: 51°28′56″N 0°3′47″W

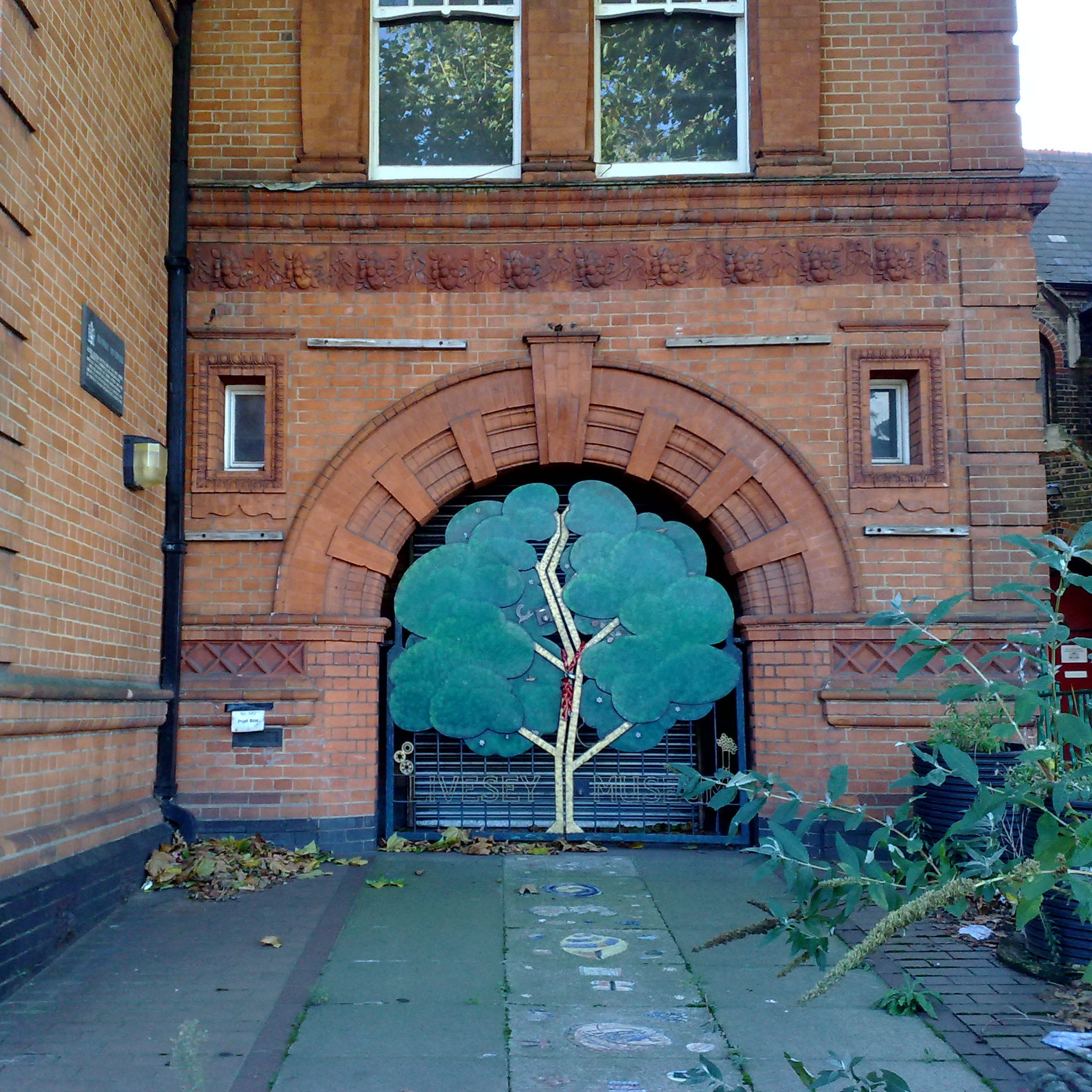
The building in November 2009

The Livesey Museum for Children was on the Old Kent Road, within the London Borough of Southwark, London, England.

The Livesey Museum was one of very few children's museums in the United Kingdom, which used to show a completely new hands-on exhibition every year. Each exhibition was suitable for all children under 12, and admission was free. It was hosted in a former public library on Old Kent Road in Southwark and was funded by Southwark Council.

Exhibitions explored such themes as Shelter, Energy, and Myths & Legends. The museum had no permanent collection, but each exhibition features objects and artwork on loan from Southwark Council's historic collections.

== Closure ==
In February 2008 Southwark Council voted to close the museum and it was planned to close to the public on 1 March 2008. The decision was due to budget cuts despite the popularity and success of the Museum. After a brief campaign to persuade the Council to keep it open, a campaign group which subsequently became a registered charity, the Friends of the Livesey Museum for Children, were proposing to form a trust, to raise funds and to run it for the community.

In April 2008 Southwark Council has now accepted that the building was covenanted and owned by a trust not by the Council itself. It is possible that the Council had been in breach of the trust by opening the building as a children's museum in 1974 after it had closed as a public library in 1966, although there is no legal distinction between a free museum or a library. This trusteeship also meant that Southwark would not be able to sell the building.

At least two organisations proposed to run the building including the Friends charity who submitted a proposal underwritten by Novas Scarman. Southwark Council voted to let the building to Theatre Peckham. Southwark needed the approval of the Charity Commission to change the trust deed to allow its use as a theatre rehearsal space rather than a public library. A scheme was proposed in 2009, but subsequently failed to raise sufficient funds to be implemented.

As of February 2010, the building was occupied by a group of squatters. Since then, the building has become part of an authorised "guardian scheme", whereby temporary residents provide security.

== Future plans for the building ==
In November 2012, Southwark Council approved Treasure House (London) CIC as preferred partners in the running of the Livesey Building. Treasure House proposed to use the building to provide education for children aged 13–19 who cannot access mainstream education, in addition to offering the local community educational and cultural programmes.

== History ==
According to the Livesey Building FAQ:

"The Livesey building was bequeathed by George Livesey, a local benefactor, to the Commissioners for Public Libraries and Museums for the Parish of Camberwell in 1890. It was given as a free public library and operated until 1966 when the then council relocated its library provision to a nearby site and the building closed to the public."

The building itself is Grade II listed. A statue of Livesey by Frederick Pomeroy, which was previously located at Livesey's nearby gas works, is in the grounds of the former museum. The statue is also Grade II listed.
