= Surrey Canal =

Coordinates: 51.485953°N 0.05095°W

- Location within Greater London
- OS grid reference: TQ365765
- London borough: Lewisham
- Ceremonial county: Greater London
- Region: London
- Country: England
- Sovereign state: United Kingdom
- Police: Metropolitan
- Fire: London
- Ambulance: London
- UK Parliament: Lewisham North
- London Assembly: Greenwich and Lewisham

Surrey Canal is an area in inner south east London, situated 2 miles (3.2 km) south-east of Tower Bridge, which was formerly home to a section of the Grand Surrey Canal. It is formed by the meeting point of three districts: Bermondsey, Deptford and New Cross.

== History and land use ==
The Grand Surrey Canal was used to transport timber from the Surrey Docks to Camberwell but it was closed in 1971 and subsequently filled in. The area surrounding this section of the canal has a history of residential development before it became a public park, Senegal Fields, in 1972. Since 1993 the former Senegal Fields site has been home to Millwall FC. Surrey Canal's boundaries as a district are roughly equal to the length of Surrey Canal Road, which runs along the perimeter of three postal code districts: SE16, SE14 and SE8.

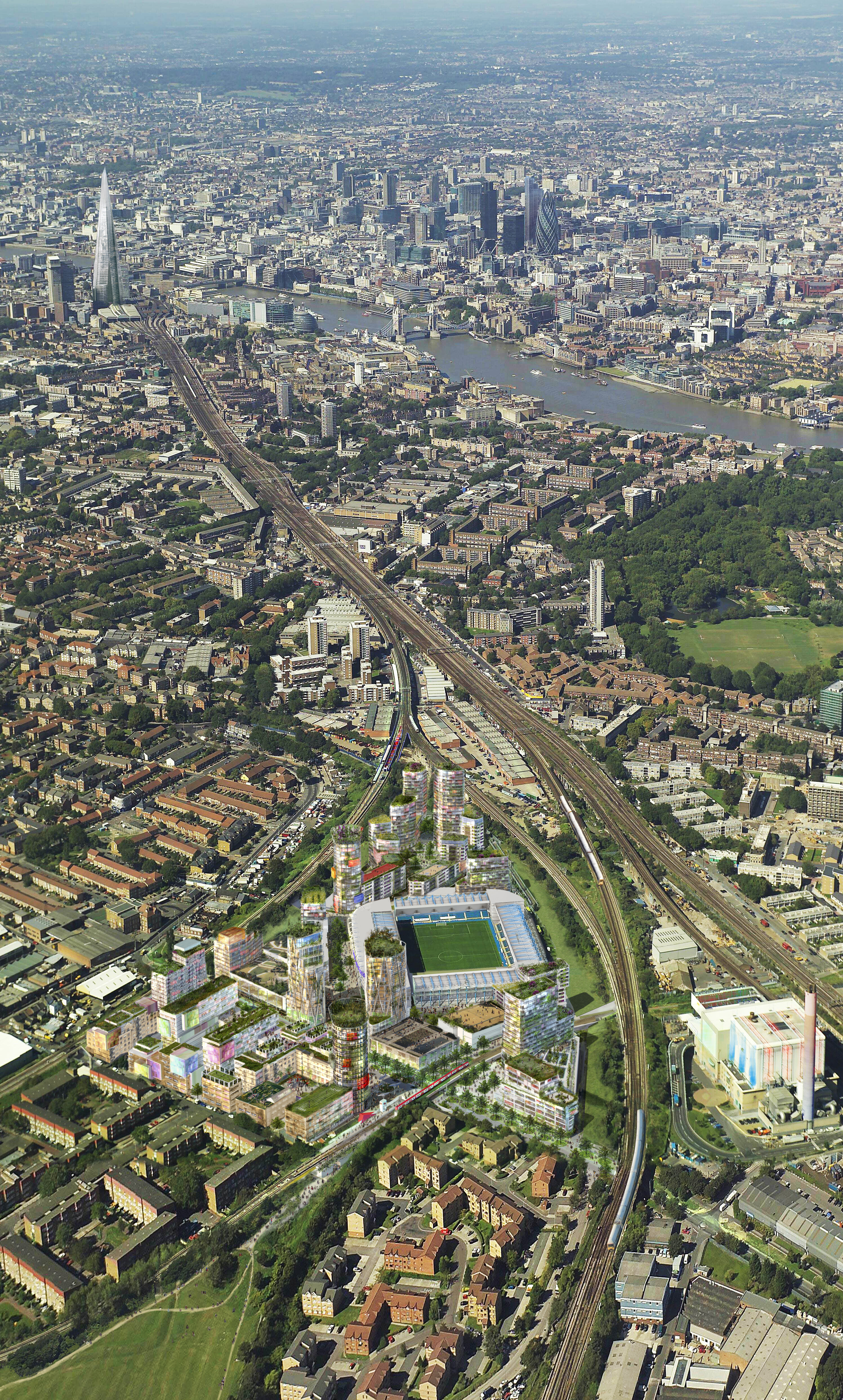
Consented redevelopment in foreground

The remaining land use is predominantly industrial, including waste and recycling processing facilities on Landmann Way and a London Overground maintenance depot.

== Proposed redevelopment ==
A development proposal, which received planning consent in March 2012, was thoroughly investigated by The Guardian newspaper in 2016 and 2017. As a result of funding claims that were false and links between the developer and Lewisham council, the scheme was cancelled. The developer (Renewal) was found to have no experience of such a scheme and lacked funds. It was registered in overseas tax havens. Followers of Millwall, local residents, former players, football commentators and supporters of clubs across the world expressed their concern about the scheme because it endangered a club with close community links.
