= Caroline Gardens =

Almshouses in London

Coordinates: 51.479299°N 0.060760°W

Caroline Gardens

Caroline Gardens is the name of the former almshouses of the Licensed Victuallers' Benevolent Institution south of Old Kent Road in Peckham, London. The buildings are Grade II listed.

== History and description ==
The Licensed Victuallers' Benevolent Institution was established in 1827 with construction of the main central block beginning the next year with Prince Augustus Frederick, patron of the institution, laying the foundation stone. The building was completed by 1833. The buildings fronting onto Asylum Road form a symmetrical block with projecting wings from the central chapel. Designed alongside the houses by Henry Rose, architect of the Licensed Victuallers' School, it has a large neoclassical portico of six Ionic columns. Its interior suffered significant damage from bombing during the Second World War. Further blocks were added in 1849, 1858 and 1866 throughout the grounds of the gardens. The latter's foundation stone was laid by the Duke of Edinburgh, Alfred Ernest Albert.

The Licensed Victuallers' Benevolent Institution moved to Denham in Buckinghamshire in 1959 with the London Borough of Southwark taking control of the property and refurbished it for the housing of local old people. It acquired its current name from former resident Caroline Secker, widow of James Secker who fought under Nelson at the Battle of Trafalgar, and is said to have caught him as he fell from being hit.
