= George Livesey =

British engineer and industrialist

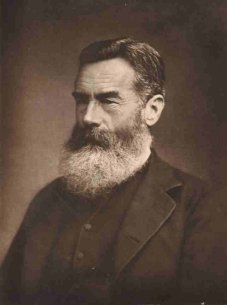
George Livesey

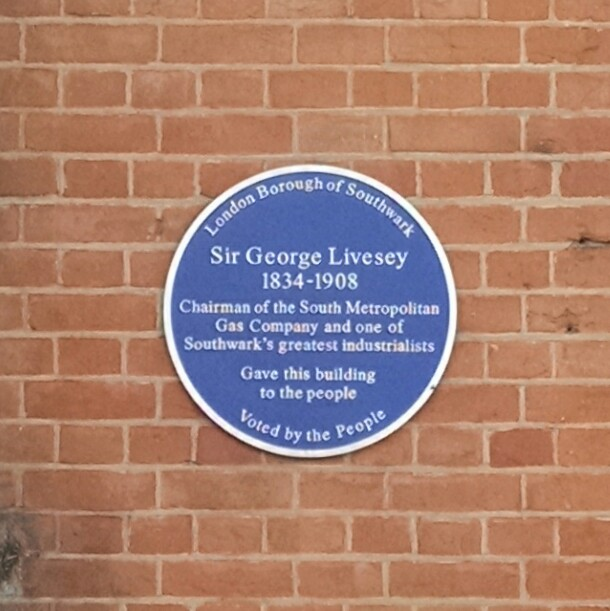
Sir George Livesey plaque

Sir George Thomas Livesey (8 April 1834 – 4 October 1908) was a British engineer, industrialist and philanthropist. He was the chairman of the South Metropolitan Gas Company, inheriting the business from his father Thomas. Gas Engineering and Management refers to him as an "eminent" figure in engineering, and a blue plaque dedicated to him describes him as "one of Southwark's greatest industrialists".

== Life ==
Livesey was born at Canonbury Terrace, Islington, London, first of the three recorded children of Thomas Livesey (1807–1871) and Ellen Livesey (born Ellen Hawes, 1806–1886). His father accepted a position with the company which became the South Metropolitan Gas Company in 1839. The Livesey family had a home near the company; Livesey and his brother, Frank, grew up with a familiarity with the company and its gas works.

In 1848, he joined the South Metropolitan Gas Company, working as an assistant to his father. He was promoted to "general manager" in 1857 and to "Engineer" in 1862. Following his father's death in 1871, he resigned from his position as a company employee, and shortly afterwards was elected company secretary by shareholders. Livesey held the two positions from the time of his father's death until 1882, when his brother, Frank, succeeded him as the company's chief engineer. In 1885, he became chairman of the board. He was instrumental in introducing a plan for sharing the profits of his company with the employees, and ensuring workers had a right to appoint up to three members of the company's board of directors. His innovative design of the water sealed holder brought him accolades.

He worked as an engineer at the Tynemouth Gas Company, and consulting engineer to the Coventry Gas Company, the Aldershot Gas Company and others. Livesey served as president of the British Association of Gas Engineers in 1874. Along with others, he seceded from that organisation to establish the Incorporated Institution of Gas Engineers but when the two organisations amalgamated, Livesey became an honorary member of the Amalgamated Society—the Institution of Gas Engineers. He was knighted in the 1902 Coronation Honours, receiving the accolade from King Edward VII at Buckingham Palace on 24 October that year. Livesey was elected a Member of Council of the Institution of Civil Engineers in 1906.

He founded the Camberwell Public Library, No. 1 on Old Kent Road in 1890; the library became the Livesey Museum for Children in 1974, which existed until its closure by Southwark Council on 1 March 2008. A statue of Livesey by Frederick Pomeroy, which was previously located at the gas works, is in the grounds of the former museum. The statue is Grade II listed.

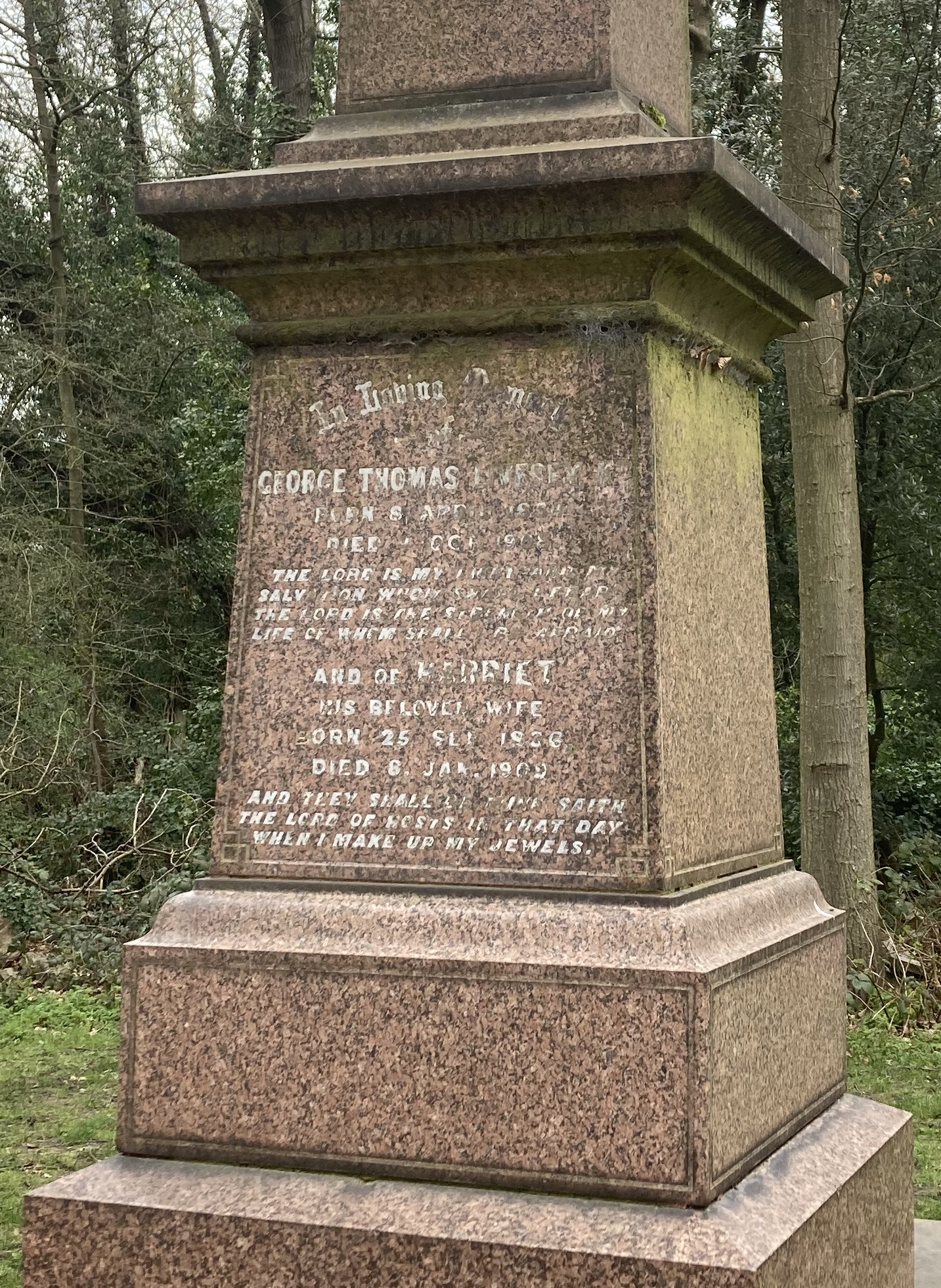
Grave of George Thomas Livesey in Nunhead Cemetery

Livesey gives his name to the Livesey Hall War Memorial. He married on 13 October 1859 at the church of St. Mary Magdalen, Peckham, to Harriet, the daughter of George Howard, a tallow chandler. While the couple had no children, Livesey taught Sunday school at Christ Church for many years. When he was younger, Livesey often played lively games of football and cricket at The Crystal Palace with the young boys from his Bible studies class. Livesey also donated land for a public recreation area near Old Kent Road. Livesey died of cancer 4 October 1908 and is buried at Nunhead Cemetery. In his memory, the gas industry established a Livesey professorship at the University of Leeds in the Department of Coal Gas and Fuel Industries. It is now known as the Department of Fuel and Energy.
