= List of public art in the London Borough of Bromley =

This is a list of public art in the London Borough of Bromley.

== Beckenham ==
Image	Title / subject	Location and coordinates	Date	Artist / designer	Type	Material	Dimensions	Designation	Notes
More images	Beckenham War Memorial	Junction of High Street, Rectory Road, Beckenham Road and Croydon Road 51.4070°N 0.03210°W	1921	Newbury Abbot Trent	Memorial	Portland stone		Grade II	Unveiled 24 July 1921.

== Bickley ==
Image	Title / subject	Location and coordinates	Date	Artist / designer	Type	Material	Dimensions	Designation	Notes
More images	Bickley War Memorial	St George's churchyard 51.4018°N 0.04937°E	1920	William Godfrey Newton	Memorial cross	Limestone and bronze		Grade II	

== Biggin Hill ==
Image	Title / subject	Location and coordinates	Date	Artist / designer	Type	Material	Dimensions	Designation	Notes
More images	Biggin Hill War Memorial	Main Road 51.3163°N 0.0330°E	1923		Memorial	Stone		Grade II	
	Hurricane and Spitfire	Main Road, at entrance to RAF chapel 51.3270°N 0.0230°E	2010 (replacements)		Sculpture				

== Bromley ==
Image	Title / subject	Location and coordinates	Date	Artist / designer	Type	Material	Dimensions	Designation	Notes
	Town pump	High Street	1860s	?	Water pump	Cast iron		—	
	War memorial	St Luke's churchyard, Bromley Common 51.3927°N 0.0311°E	c. 1920	?	Wheel-head cross with figure of Christ	Portland stone and bronze		Grade II	
	War memorial	Holy Trinity churchyard, Bromley Common 51.3801°N 0.0426°E	1920	Evelyn Hellicar	Memorial cross	Portland stone		Grade II	Unveiled 29 July 1920.
More images	War memorial	St Peter and St Paul's churchyard 51.4050°N 0.0127°E	1921	Sydney March	Column with sculpture	Portland stone		Grade II	Unveiled 20 March 1921.
More images	Bromley War Memorial	Martin's Hill 51°24′17.7″N 00°00′39.9″E	1922	Sydney March	Memorial	Portland stone and bronze		Grade II*	Unveiled 29 October 1922.
	Darwin Mural Charles Darwin	High Street, on side of Daniel's 51.4055°N 0.0154°E	2008	Bruce Williams	Mural	Paint		—	

== Chislehurst ==
Image	Title / subject	Location and coordinates	Date	Artist / designer	Type	Material	Dimensions	Designation	Notes
More images	Chislehurst War Memorial	Bromley Road 51.4124°N 00.0735°E	1920	Reginald Blomfield	Memorial	Stone		Grade II	Unveiled 17 October 1920. An example of Blomfield's much-used Cross of Sacrifice design; Blomfield visited Chislehurst and chose the site himself due to his friendship with Louis Birkett, the honorary secretary of the committee responsible for erecting the memorial.

== Crystal Palace ==
Image	Title / subject	Location and coordinates	Date	Artist / designer	Type	Material	Dimensions	Designation	Notes
More images	Prehistoric animals Anoplotherium, Dicynodon, Hylaeosaurus✻, Ichthyosaurus, Labyrinthodon, Mantellodon✻, Megaloceros, Megalosaurus✻, Megatherium, Mosasaurus, Palaeotherium, Plesiosaurs, Pterodactyl, Teleosaurus ✻ Dinosaurs	Crystal Palace Park 51.4175°N 0.0675°W	1852–1855	Benjamin Waterhouse Hawkins	Statues	Re-constituted stone		Grade I	
More images	Bust of Joseph Paxton	Crystal Palace Park 51.4210°N 0.0707°W	1869	William F. Woodington	Bust	Carrara marble		Grade II	
More images	Gorilla Guy the Gorilla	Adjacent to Lower Lake, Crystal Palace Park 51.4188°N 0.0646°W	1961	David Wynne	Statue	Belgian marble		Grade II	

== Keston ==
Image	Title / subject	Location and coordinates	Date	Artist / designer	Type	Material	Dimensions	Designation	Notes
More images	Keston War Memorial	Heathfield Road 51.3580°N 0.0320°E	1920	Sydney March	Stylised Latin cross	Portland stone and bronze		Grade II	Unveiled 10 March 1920.

== Mottingham ==
Image	Title / subject	Location and coordinates	Date	Artist / designer	Type	Material	Dimensions	Designation	Notes
More images	Mottingham War Memorial	Junction of Mottingham Road and West Park 51.4374°N 0.0430°E	1920	George Hubbard	Memorial	Stone		Grade II	

== Orpington ==
Image	Title / subject	Location and coordinates	Date	Artist / designer	Type	Material	Dimensions	Designation	Notes
More images	Orpington War Memorial	Junction of High Street, Spur Road, Sevenoaks Road and Station Road 51.3731°N 0.0975°E	1921	Charles Heaton Comyn	Memorial	Stone		Grade II	Unveiled 28 August 1921.

== Penge ==
Image	Title / subject	Location and coordinates	Date	Artist / designer	Type	Material	Dimensions	Designation	Notes
	War memorial	Holy Trinity churchyard 51.4186°N 0.04856°W	1921	?	Memorial cross	Portland stone		Grade II	Unveiled 19 February 1921.
More images	Penge War Memorial	High Street 51.4165°N 0.0559°W	1925	?	Celtic cross	Granite		Grade II	Unveiled 25 September 1925.

== Petts Wood ==
Image	Title / subject	Location and coordinates	Date	Artist / designer	Type	Material	Dimensions	Designation	Notes
More images	William Willett Memorial Sundial	Petts Wood 51°24′11.8″N 0°5′0″E	1927		Sundial	Stone			

== St Mary Cray ==
Image	Title / subject	Location and coordinates	Date	Artist / designer	Type	Material	Dimensions	Designation	Notes
More images	St Mary Cray War Memorial	St Mary's churchyard 51.3951°N 0.1149°E	1919	?	Celtic cross	Portland stone		Grade II	Unveiled 29 December 1919.

== Shortlands ==
Image	Title / subject	Location and coordinates	Date	Artist / designer	Type	Material	Dimensions	Designation	Notes
More images	Shortlands War Memorial	Junction of Kingswood Road and Church Road 51.4015°N 0.0002°W	1921	W. D. Caröe	Celtic cross	Leckhampton stone		Grade II	Unveiled 9 October 1921.

== West Wickham ==
Image	Title / subject	Location and coordinates	Date	Artist / designer	Type	Material	Dimensions	Designation	Notes
More images	West Wickham War Memorial	Corkscrew Hill 51.3712°N 0.0088°W	1921	?	Memorial cross	Granite		Grade II	Unveiled 12 June 1921 on the High Street; moved to this site in 1939.
