= Bromley War Memorial =

War memorial in London

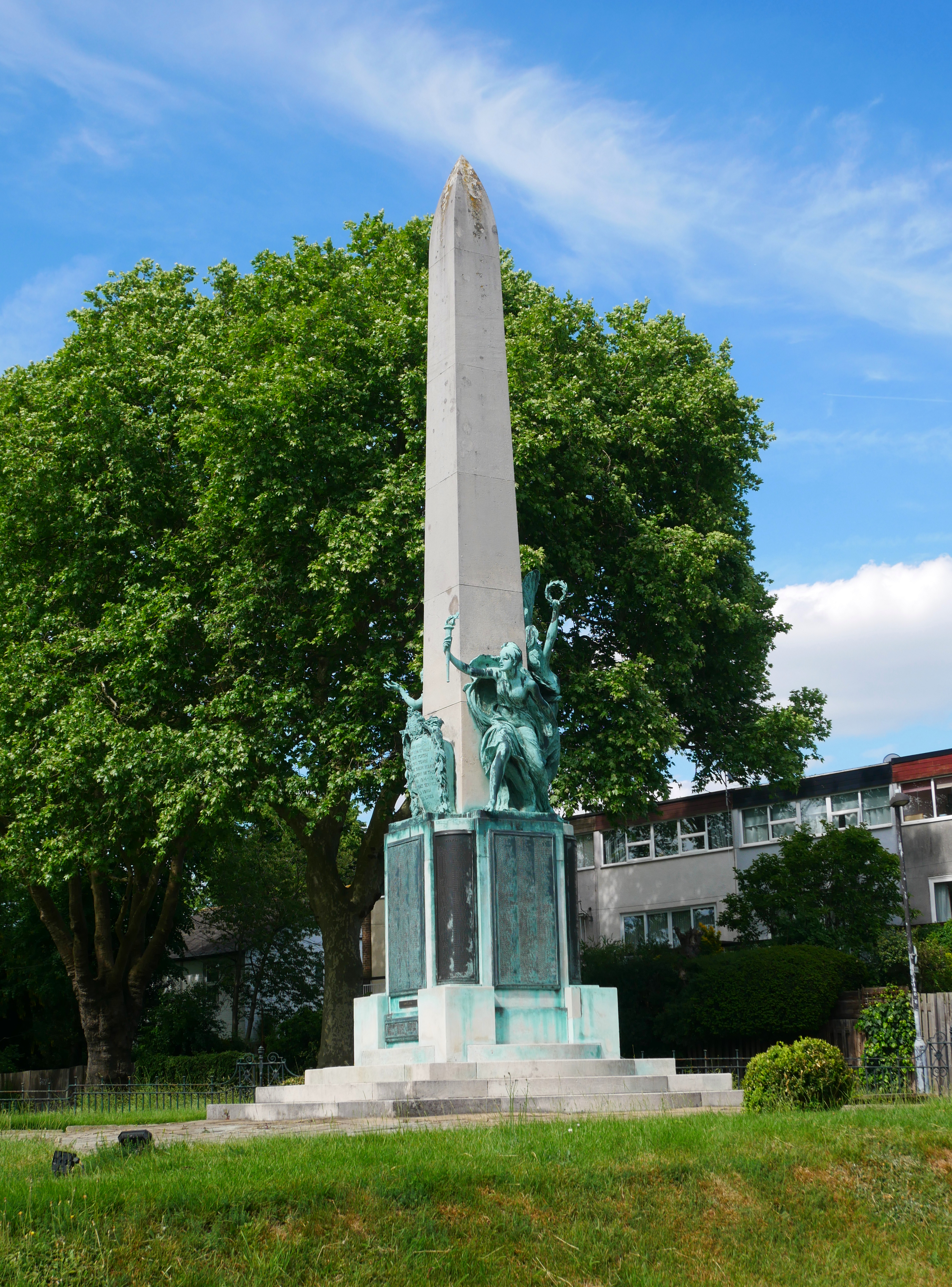
- Bromley War Memorial as viewed from the southwest
- Interactive map of Bromley War Memorial
- Location: Bromley, Greater London, England
- Coordinates: 51°24′17.7″N 00°00′39.9″E
- Designer: Sydney March
- Type: obelisk
- Material: Bronze and Portland stone
- Completion date: 1922
- Opening date: 1922
- Dedicated to: Fallen of World War I and World War II

The Bromley War Memorial in Bromley, Greater London, England commemorates the fallen of World War I and World War II. It was designed by British sculptor Sydney March, of the March family of artists.

== Location ==
The Bromley War Memorial is located on Martin's Hill near the intersection of Glassmill Lane and Church Road in Bromley, Greater London, England. The memorial is set within a garden and surrounded by iron railings. It is positioned inside the entrance to Martin's Hill, Bromley's first ornamental park. Martin's Hill was ostensibly named after a baker who once resided there. For years, the residents of Bromley promenaded on the hill. In the latter half of the 1800s, Martin's Hill had a commanding view of the Crystal Palace in Hyde Park, London. Bromley itself took its name from the broom, a yellow-flowered shrub, that once grew abundantly in the area. In the 1800s, Martin's Hill was one of the last places that still had flowering broom. In 1878, the site was acquired by the Bromley Council; trees and flower beds were planted, and it became an ornamental park. The National Grid Reference for the Bromley War Memorial is TQ 39979 69238.

== Design ==
The monument includes a square obelisk constructed of Portland stone, a limestone quarried on the Isle of Portland in the English Channel. It is positioned on a base with three steps. The memorial features three bronze figures adjacent to the lower portion of the obelisk. On the fourth side of the obelisk, the back of the monument, there is a bronze cartouche. In addition, there are bronze plaques with the names of the fallen on all four sides of the base. The statues include a winged Victory in the centre, with a laurel wreath. That statue is flanked by two additional bronze figures, one of Liberty with a torch and the other of Peace with flowers of remembrance. The monument records the names of 769 soldiers from the area who died in World War I. It also lists the names of 476 soldiers and civilians who were killed during World War II. The memorial was completed by the sculptor in 1922.

== Dedications ==
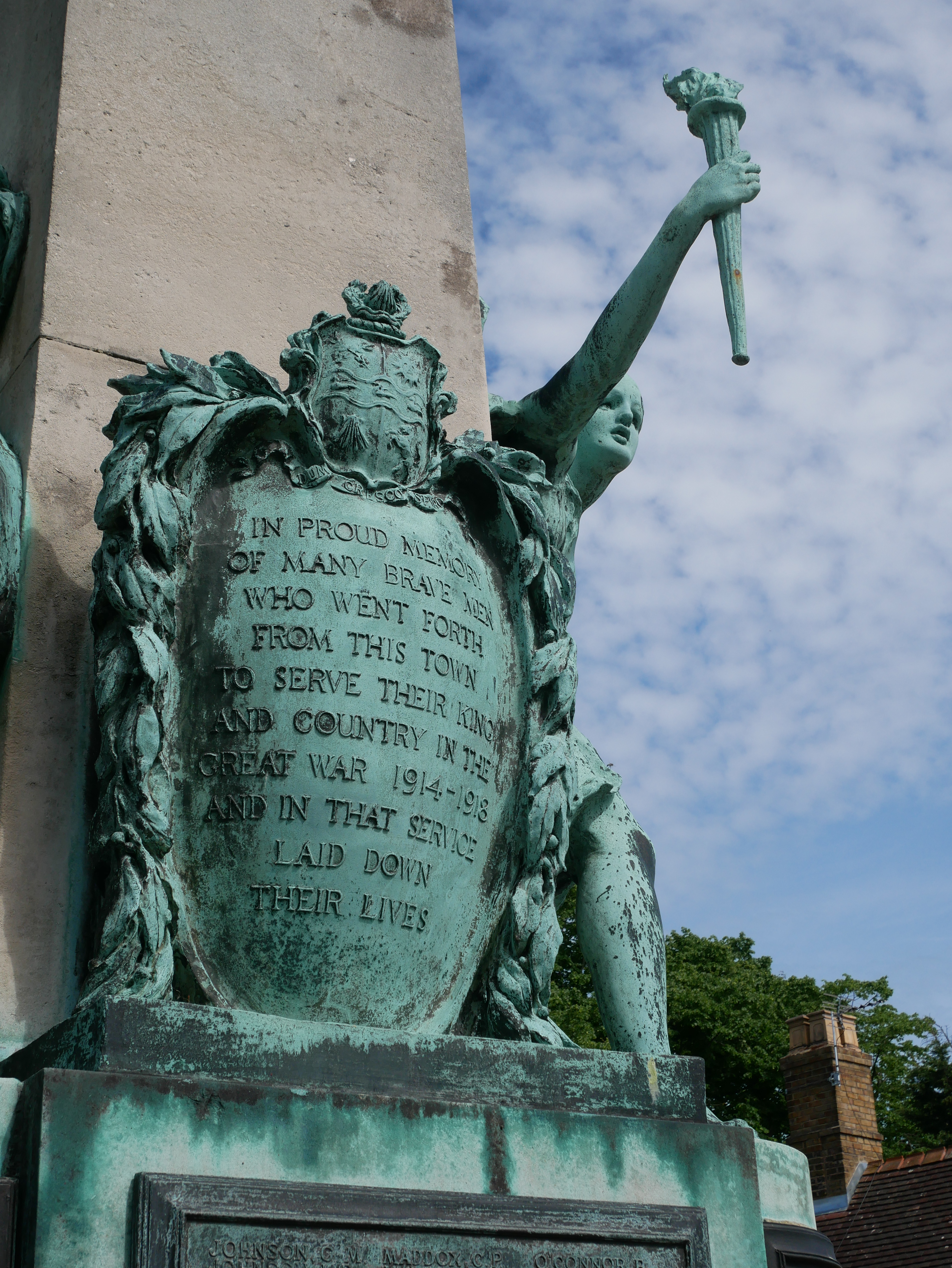
Plaque on the west face of the war memorial

The Bromley War Memorial was unveiled on 29 October 1922, by Lord Henry Horne, 1st Baron Horne, G.C.B., K.C.M.G. (1861–1929). Sir Henry Horne was a general during World War I. The monument was dedicated by the Bishop of Rochester, John Reginald Harmer D.D. (1857–1944), an Anglican bishop. Before his service in Rochester, Kent, Harmer served as Bishop of Adelaide. The rededication purportedly took place on 6 November 1949, Remembrance Sunday. However, Remembrance Sunday falls on the second Sunday in November, the Sunday closest to Armistice Day (11 November). The dedication of the plaques for the fallen of World War II was performed by the Vicar of Bromley, the Rev. W. H. Murray-Walton. In his brief address, he stated "This memorial, in front of which we now stand, was dedicated in memory of those who laid down their lives in the First World War. Since 1939, however, it has also been a silent symbol of remembrance of those who were killed in the last war." Those present included the mayor, Alderman B. J. Finnie, and other council members, as well as the Parliament member for Bromley, Harold Macmillan.

== National Heritage List for England ==
The Bromley War Memorial was listed on the National Heritage List for England on 14 December 1995. The National Heritage List is the official database for all national heritage assets in England. It is managed by English Heritage, the Historic Buildings and Monuments Commission for England. The war memorial's English Heritage list entry number is 1116976. Its English Heritage building ID number and Images of England number is 442525. Images of England is a photographic library of the country's listed structures, as of the turn of the 21st century. The Bromley War Memorial is listed as a Grade II* structure. Grade II* structures are particularly important structures "of more than special interest." Only 5.5% of listed structures are Grade II*. The majority are Grade II.

== Sculptor ==
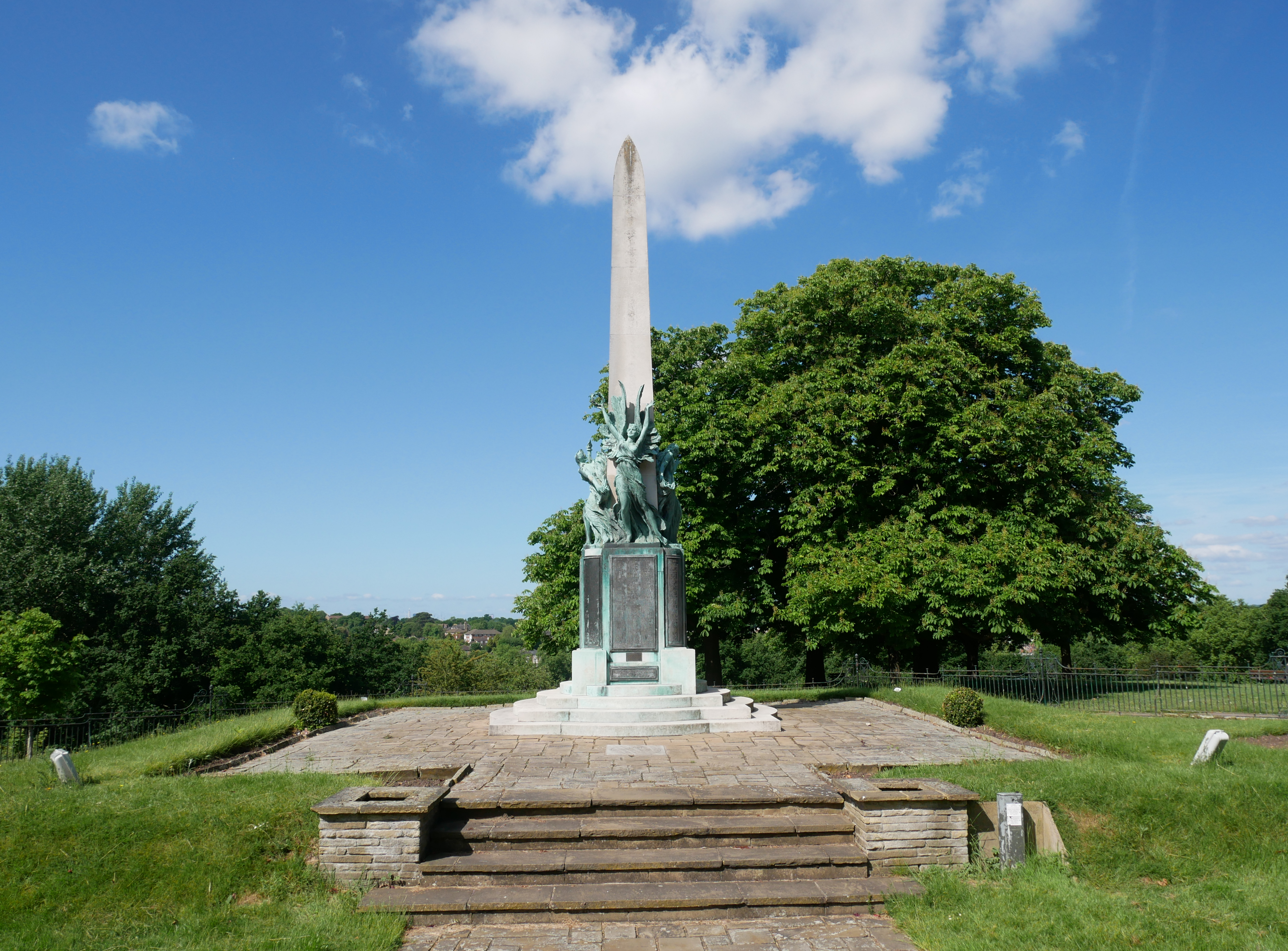
The east face of Bromley War Memorial on Martin's Hill

The Bromley War Memorial was designed and sculpted by British artist Sydney March. The son of George and Elizabeth March, he was born in 1876 in Stoneferry, a suburb of Hull, East Riding of Yorkshire, England. He was the second of nine children, eight of whom became artists. As a child, Sydney March worked as a monumental sculptor's apprentice. Later, he attended the Royal Academy Schools, where he won first prize in 1900. March exhibited thirteen times at The Exhibition of the Royal Academy of Arts between 1906 and 1932. His family established studios at their home of Goddendene in Farnborough, Kent in 1902. Sydney March was a prolific artist whose primary focus was war memorials, as well as sculptures of British royalty and other contemporary figures.

He and his siblings completed the National War Memorial of Canada after the 1930 death of their brother, sculptor Vernon March. Other monuments for which he is renowned include the Royal Inniskilling Fusiliers South African War Memorial in Northern Ireland, the United Empire Loyalist Monument in Canada, and the Lancaster Monument in England. Smaller-scale pieces include the portrait busts of King Edward VII and Cecil John Rhodes, both in the National Portrait Gallery in London. Sydney March died in 1968 at age 92. His ashes were interred in the family plot at Saint Giles the Abbot Churchyard in Farnborough. In 1922, Sydney had sculpted the bronze angel monument that marks the March plot.

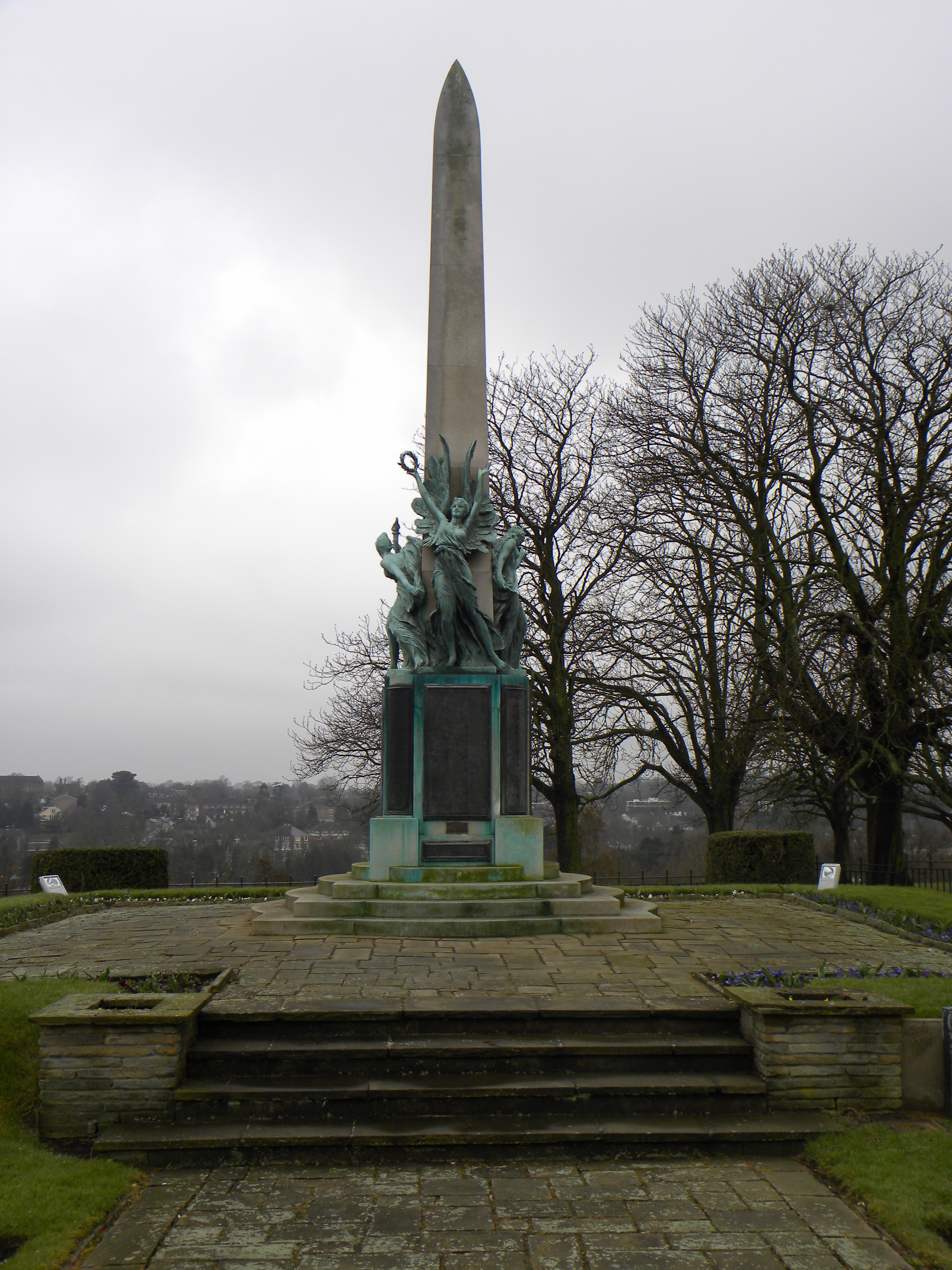
Front

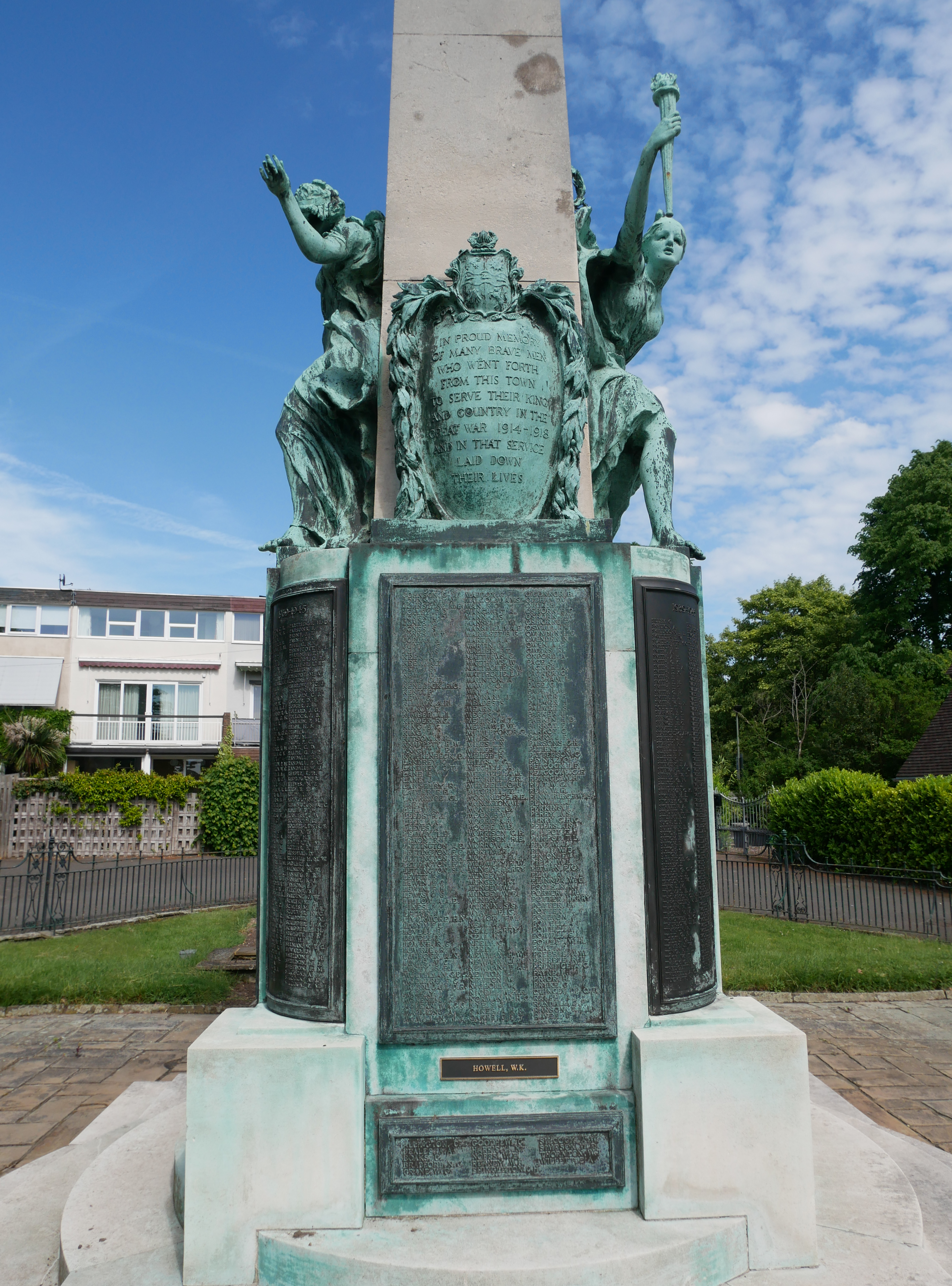
West face

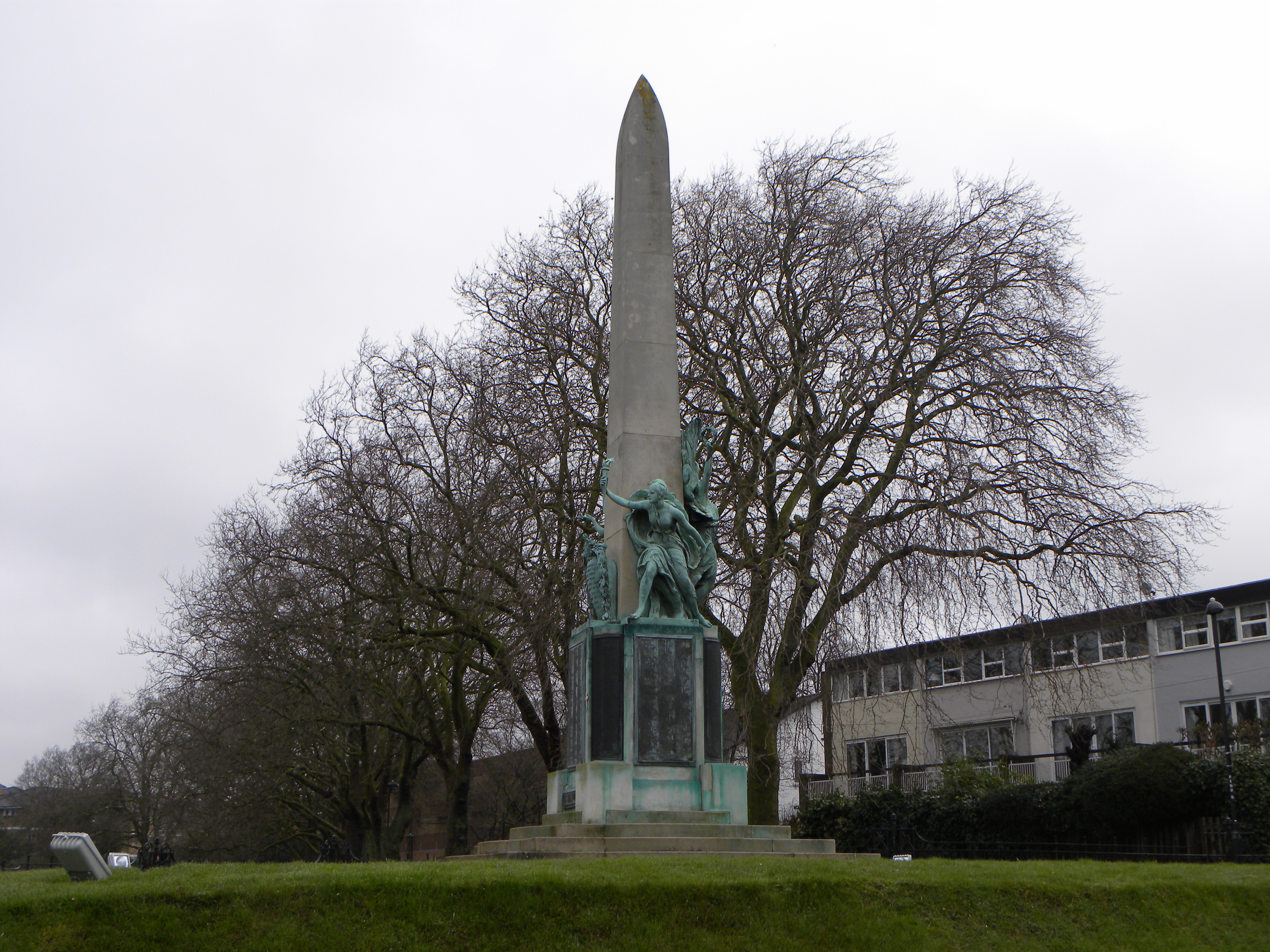
Left side

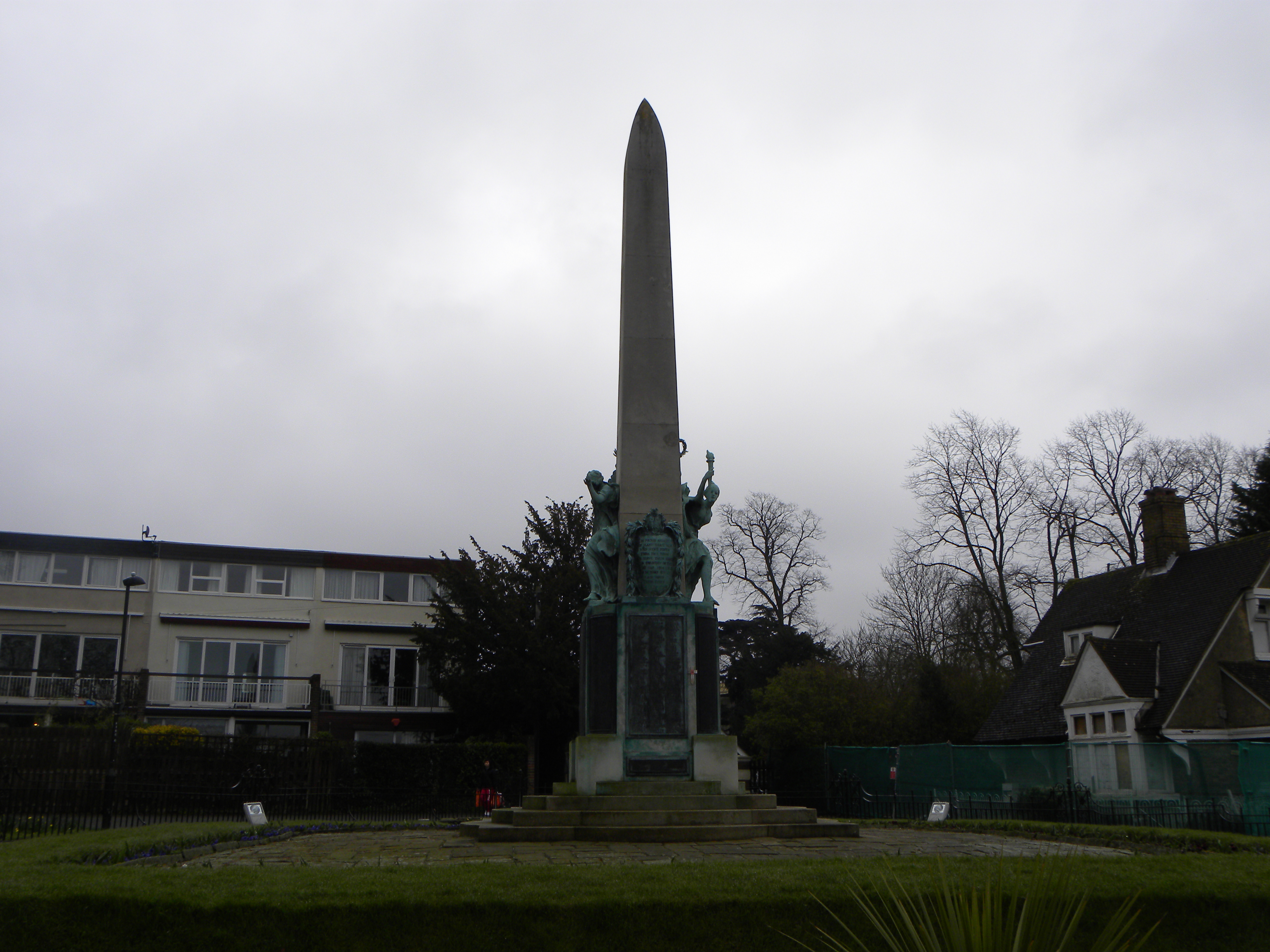
Back

== See also ==
- Grade II* listed war memorials in England
- List of public art in Bromley
- Bromley Parish Church Memorial
