= Statue of Samuel Bourne Bevington =

Statue in Bermondsey, London

Coordinates: 51.502908°N 0.078091°W

Samuel Bourne Bevington
- Artist: Sydney March
- Completion date: 1910
- Subject: Samuel Bourne Bevington
- Location: London

Listed Building – Grade II
- Official name: Statue on Island Site in Front of South London College and Railings
- Designated: 17 September 1972
- Reference no.: 1385976

A statue of Samuel Bourne Bevington, by Sydney March, stands on Tooley Street in Bermondsey, London. The statue is Grade II listed.

== Background ==
Samuel Bourne Bevington was a popular local businessman and politician of Bermondsey. He was a member of the Bevington family, a significant local employer through businesses including the Neckinger Mills. He also served as the first mayor of the Metropolitan Borough of Bermondsey, completing two terms, before declining an invitation to serve a third due to poor health.

While not widely lauded elsewhere, he was deeply popular in his locality. Those working with him presented a portrait by Henry Grant to be hung in the Bermondsey Town Hall, and after his death raised a committee for the erection of a statue. After several attempts to make public appeals for the erection of a statue by public subscription, funding was eventually acquired with a substantial sum likely given by Bevington's son R. K. Bevington. The sculpture was completed by Sydney March by 1910 and erected by January 1911, unveiled on the 18th of March 1911.

== Description ==
The statue is of bronze on a Portland stone pedestal, occupying a plot on the junction between Queen Elizabeth Street and Tooley Street. Bevington is depicted standing in full mayoral attire, holding his hat in his left hand.
