= Sydney March =

English sculptor

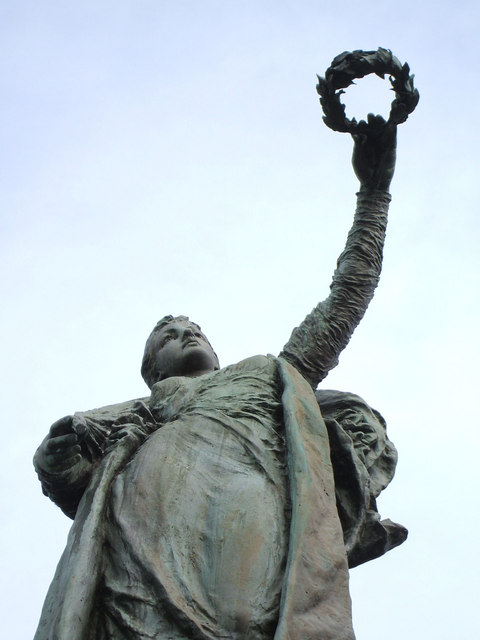
- Royal Inniskilling Fusiliers South African War Memorial
- Born: 1876; Stoneferry, Kingston upon Hull, East Riding of Yorkshire, England
- Died: 1968 (aged 91–92); Kent, England
- Burial place: Saint Giles the Abbot Churchyard, Farnborough, Kent, England
- Education: Royal Academy Schools
- Occupation: Sculptor
- Works: Bromley War Memorial; National War Memorial of Canada; Portrait busts of King Edward VII and Cecil Rhodes
- Awards: First Prize, Silver Medal, 1900, Royal Academy Schools

Sydney March (1876–1968) was an English sculptor. His primary focus was portrait busts and other sculptures of British royalty and contemporary figures, as well as war memorials. The second-born of eight artists in his family, he and his siblings completed the National War Memorial of Canada after the death of their brother Vernon March in 1930, who had created the winning design. It is the site in Ottawa of annual Remembrance Day ceremonies.

Among his many commissions, Sydney March also made a memorial to United Empire Loyalists, which was erected in 1929 in Hamilton, Ontario. Several of the siblings never married; they lived and worked together at "Goddendene", a 17-room house in Farnborough, Kent, England. They had three large studios and an iron foundry on the grounds.

== Background ==
Sydney March, son of George Henry March and his wife Elizabeth Blenkin, was born in 1876 in Stoneferry, a suburb of Kingston upon Hull, in the East Riding of Yorkshire, England. He was the second of nine children, eight of whom became artists. At the time of the 1891 census, March was working as a monumental sculptor's apprentice. His father was a seed crusher foreman (oil miller).

By 1901, the family had moved to Battersea, London, where his father was employed as a builder's clerk. March studied at the Royal Academy Schools. Three of the March children became sculptors: Sydney, Elsie, and Vernon. The other five artists were Edward, Percival, Frederick, Dudley, and Walter. The ninth sibling was a sister, Eva. Their parents died in 1904.

By 1911, all nine siblings, as yet unmarried, were living together in the 17-room house "Goddendene" in Farnborough, Kent, England. Only two of the March siblings married; between them, they had three children. Eva married Charles Francis Newman in 1916. They had a daughter, Heather. Frederick March married Agnes Annie Gow in 1926. They had two children, Elizabeth and Cecil.

== Career ==
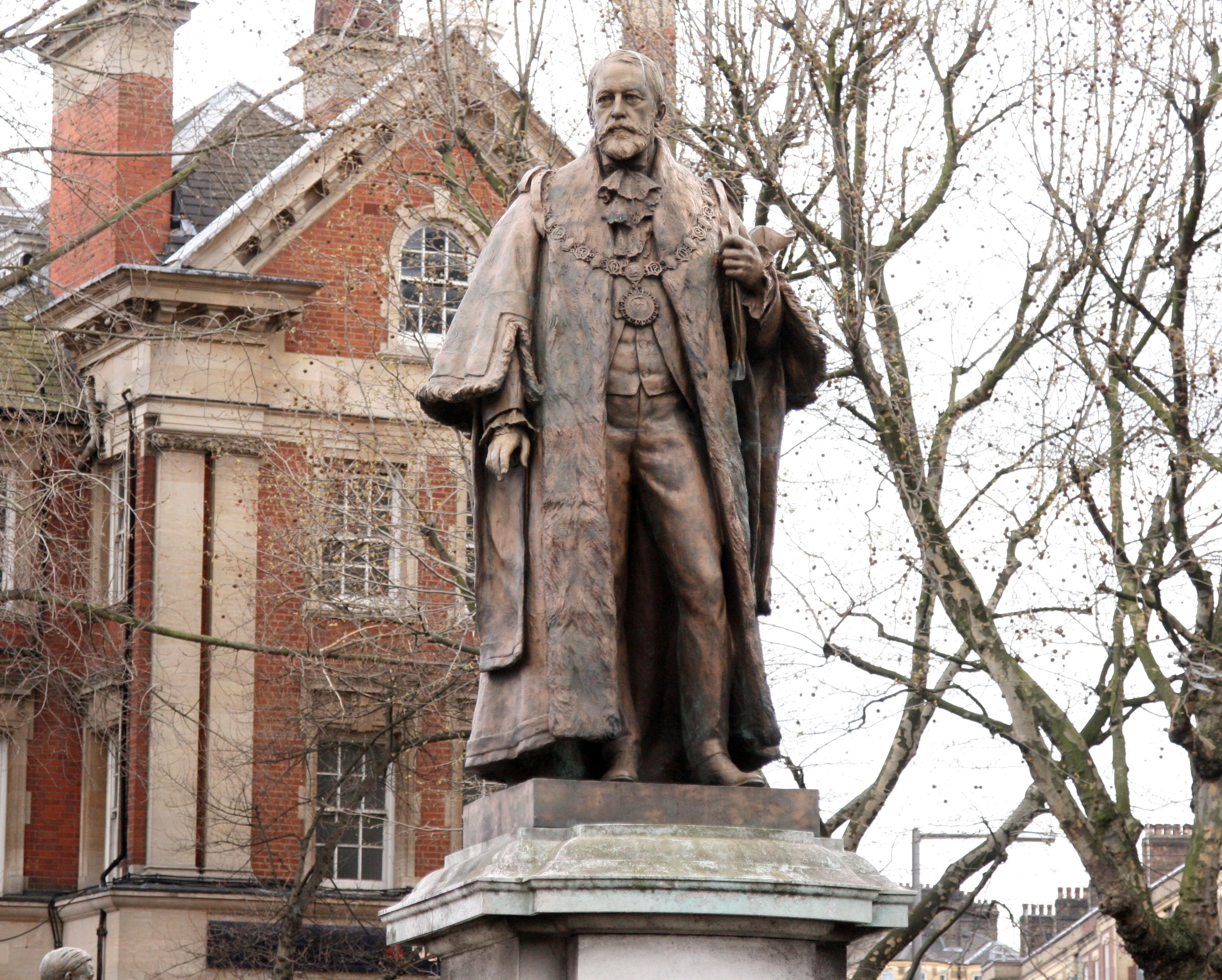
Monument to Col. Samuel B. Bevington

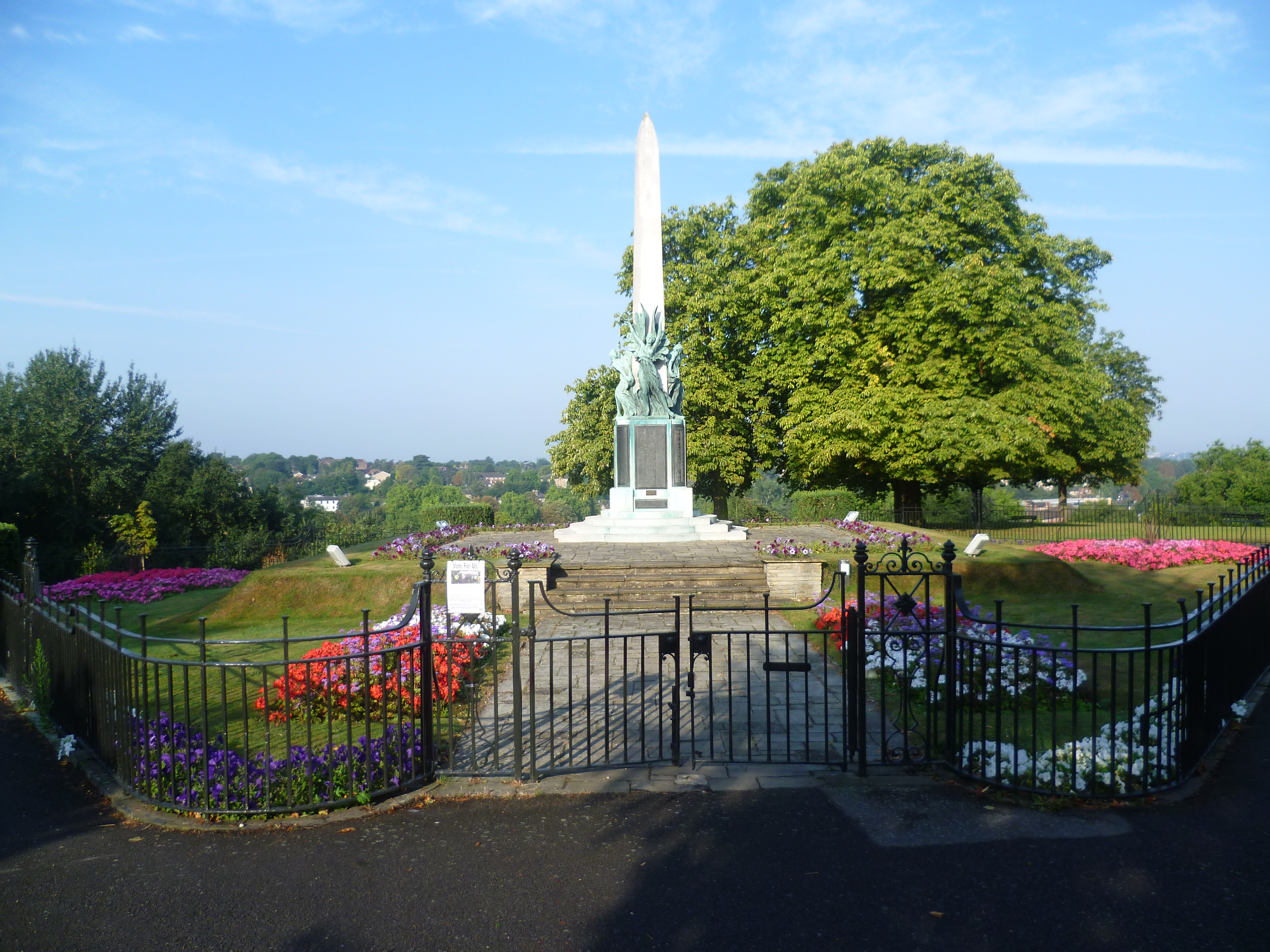
Bromley War Memorial

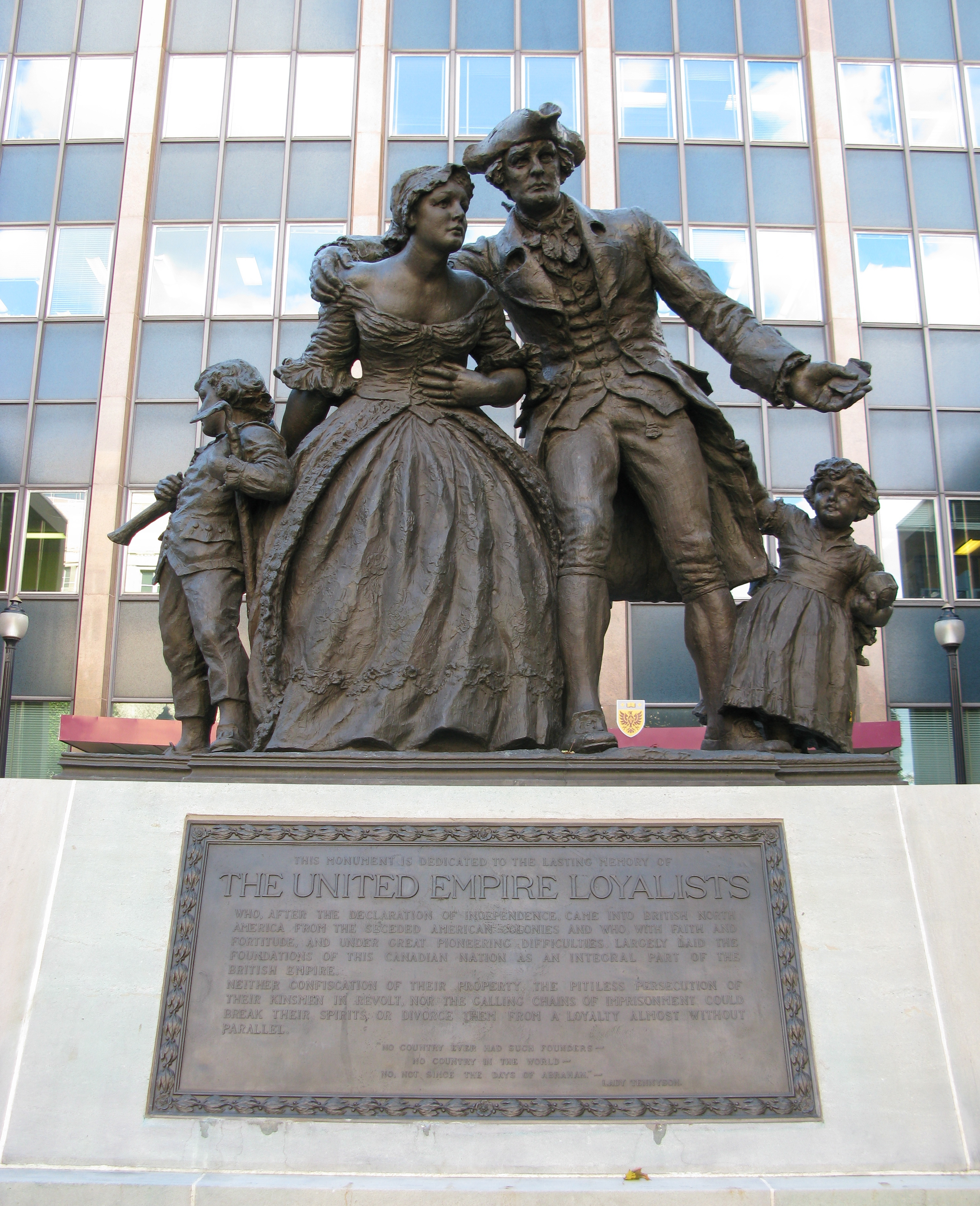
United Empire Loyalist Monument

March and his siblings established studios at the family home of Goddendene in Locksbottom, Farnborough after 1901. They made three large studios on the seven-acre grounds, and a metal foundry for sculptures. The studio walls could be slid back, such that the artists could work in natural daylight. The ceilings of the studios were so tall that parachutes could be hung to dry here during the war.

In 1900, the Royal Academy Schools awarded Sydney March first prize, a silver medal, for a model of a statue or group. Between 1906 and 1932, he exhibited thirteen times at the Exhibition of the Royal Academy of Arts. He exhibited a total of seventeen works at the Royal Academy, primarily portrait busts, statuettes, and equestrian statues. March is lesser known for his portraits, however, several can be found in public collections including at the BC Archives, in Victoria British Columbia, and the National Maritime Museum in London.

In addition to casting works at the family foundry, March also had his work cast by the silversmith and bronze foundry of Elkington & Co. One of March's first commissions was a bust of Edward VII. This prompted a visit by the British royal family to the family home of Goddendene.

Selected works included:

- Coronation portrait bust, "King Edward VII" (1841–1910), 1901, for Windsor Castle, in the National Portrait Gallery in London since 1924.
- Bronze portrait bust of "Cecil John Rhodes" (1853–1902), South African imperialist and statesman, 1901, held in the National Portrait Gallery since 1960.
- Monument to Colonel Samuel Bourne Bevington, philanthropist, first mayor of Bermondsey, bronze statue in mayoral robes on stone base, erected 1910, on Tooley Street in London. Listed as a Grade II structure on the National Heritage List for England on 27 September 1972 and amended on 17 September 1998.
- Equestrian statue of Lord Kitchener, Commander in Chief of the Indian Army, 1914, installed in Calcutta.
- Bronze bust of Field Marshal Sir John French, 1st Earl of Ypres (1857–1925), commander of the British Expeditionary Force from August 1914 to December 1915, produced during WWI.
- Equestrian statue of Lord Kitchener, installed at Kitchener Barracks on Khartoum Road in Chatham. Added to the National Heritage List for England on 24 May 1971. Amended 21 November 1996. Listed as a Grade II structure.
- Bromley Parish Church Memorial, to commemorate the parishioners who died in World War I, 1921, at Saint Peter and Saint Paul Church on Church Road in Bromley, Kent.
- Bromley War Memorial, square obelisk constructed of Portland stone with three bronze figures, which represent Liberty, Victory, and Peace. Victory in the center, winged and holding a laurel wreath. Flanked by Liberty, with a torch, and Peace, with flowers of remembrance. At Martin's Hill on Glassmill Lane in Bromley, Kent. Erected 1922. Listed as a Grade II structure on the National Heritage List for England on 14 December 1995.
- United Empire Loyalist Monument, unveiled on Empire Day 23 May 1929, at Prince's Square on Main Street East in Hamilton, Ontario. Gift to the city of Hamilton from Stanley Mills. The basis of a commemorative plate issued in 1932. Also the basis of a stamp issued on Dominion Day, 1 July 1934. Unveiled for the second time on 25 June 1958 by Governor General Vincent Massey. Depicts a family of Loyalists just after drawing their lot number from the surveyor.
- Lancaster Monument at East Sheen Cemetery on Sheen Road in Richmond, Surrey, England. Marks the graves of George William Lancaster (died 1920) and Louisa Mary Lancaster (died 1922). Constructed of Portland stone and bronze. Listed as a Grade II* structure on the National Heritage List for England on 5 March 1992. Described by Hugh Meller, author of London Cemeteries: An Illustrated Guide & Gazetteer, as "arguably the most dramatic sculpture in any of London's cemeteries." The title of the piece is "The Angel of Death".

== National War Memorial of Canada ==
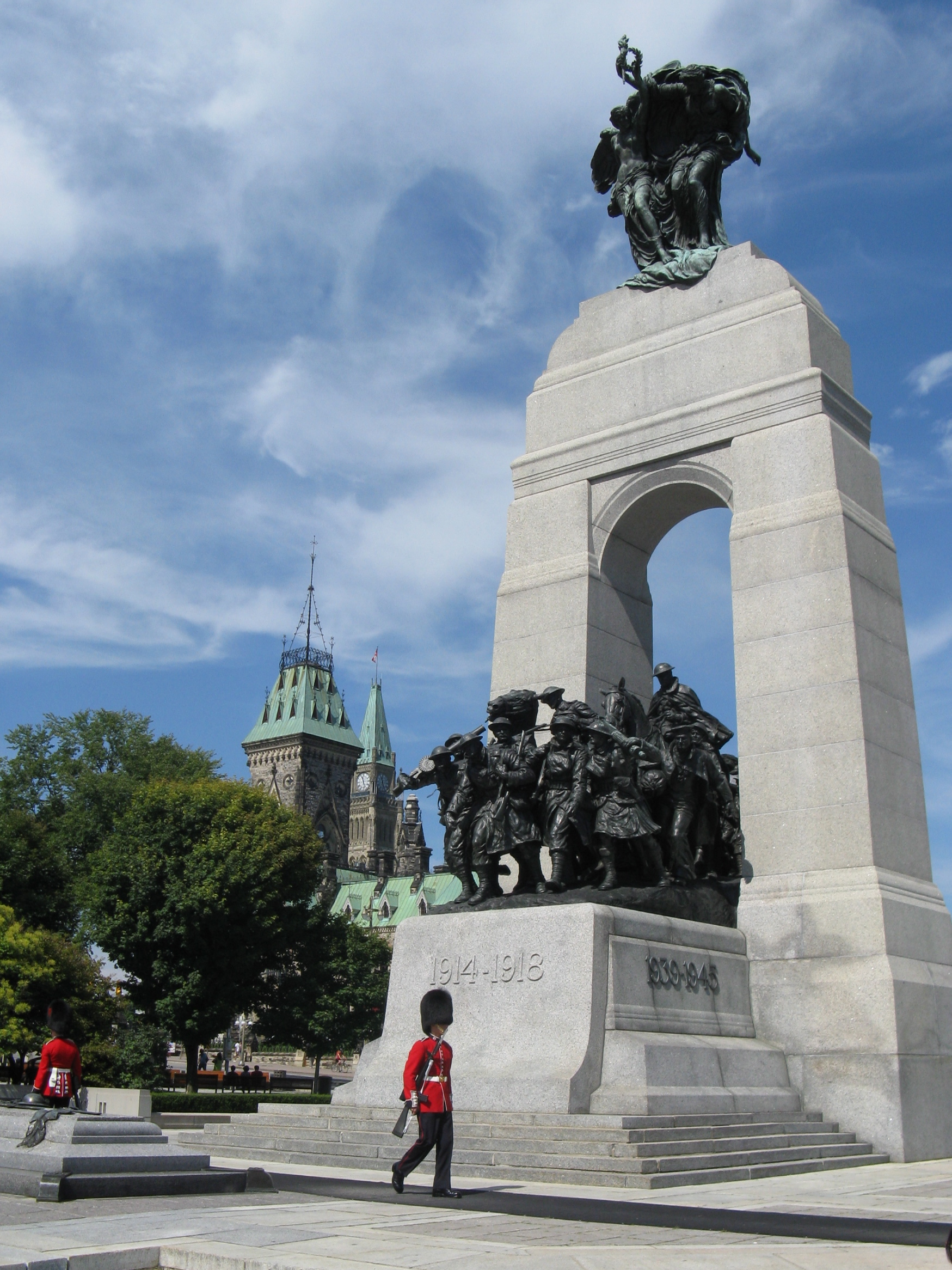
National War Memorial of Canada

The March siblings often collaborated on their art pieces. The best known example of this is The Response, the National War Memorial of Canada in Ottawa, Ontario. Sydney's brother Vernon March, after a world-wide competition in 1925, was one of seven finalists of a field of 127 entrants. The seven finalists submitted scale models of their proposed designs. Vernon was awarded the commission in January 1926. Vernon March's design included bronze figures of Victory and Liberty on top of a granite arch. Below the arch, at the rear, is an unlimbered cannon. The monument includes 22 bronze figures under the arch, representing the branches of the Canadian forces during World War I.

Vernon March died of pneumonia in 1930, before the monument had been completed. Together with their sister Elsie March and four brothers, Sydney March completed the bronze figures for the monument by July 1932. However, the site in Canada had not yet been prepared, as construction of the arch in Ottawa was delayed. The bronze figures were mounted on a base and displayed at Hyde Park in London for six months. Later, they were stored at the family studios at Goddendene. In 1937, the bronzes were shipped to Ottawa. After construction of the arch and preparation of the surrounding area, the National War Memorial of Canada was unveiled by King George VI on 21 May 1939. It commemorates the Canadian response in WWI.

== Bronze figures of the National War Memorial ==
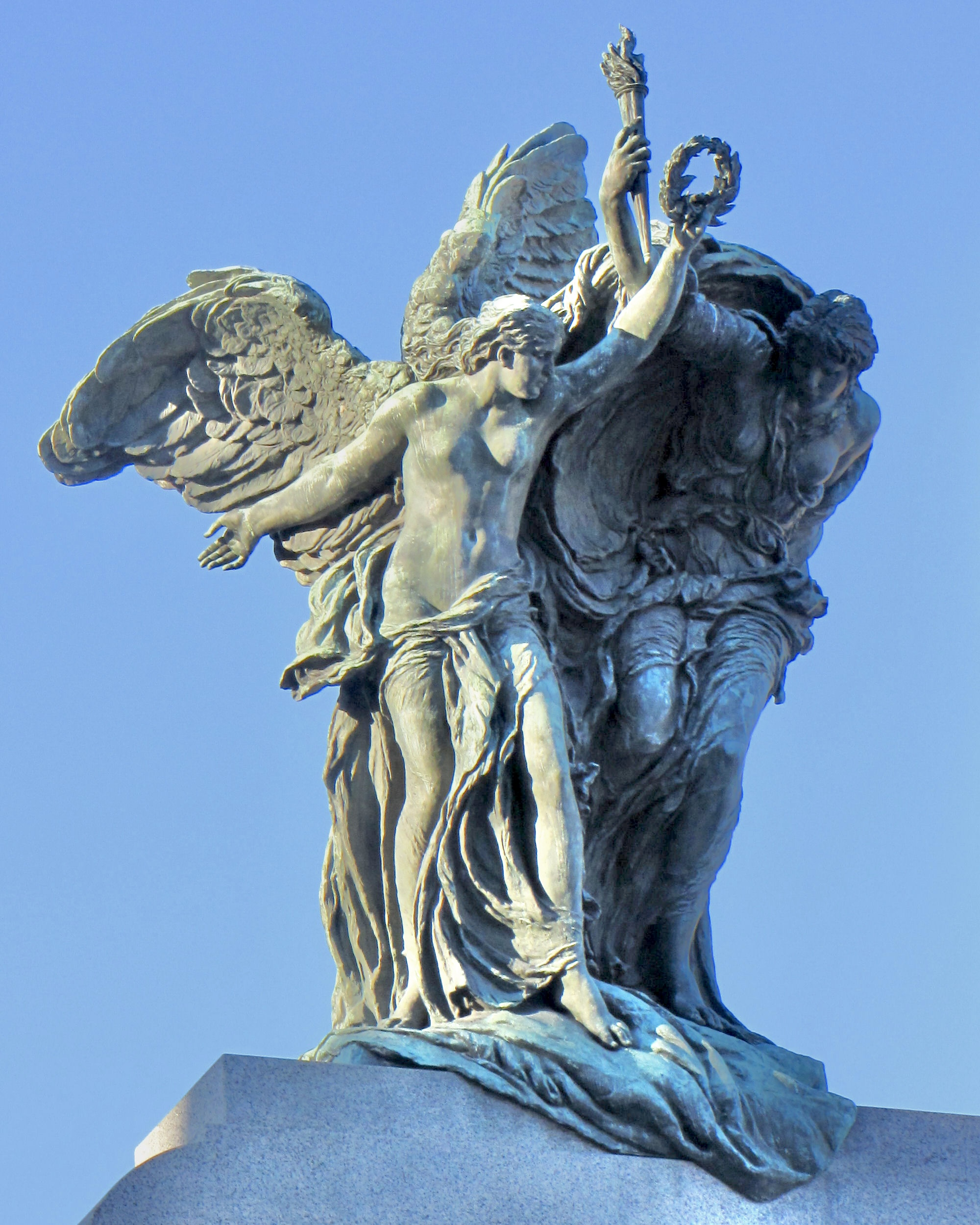
Top

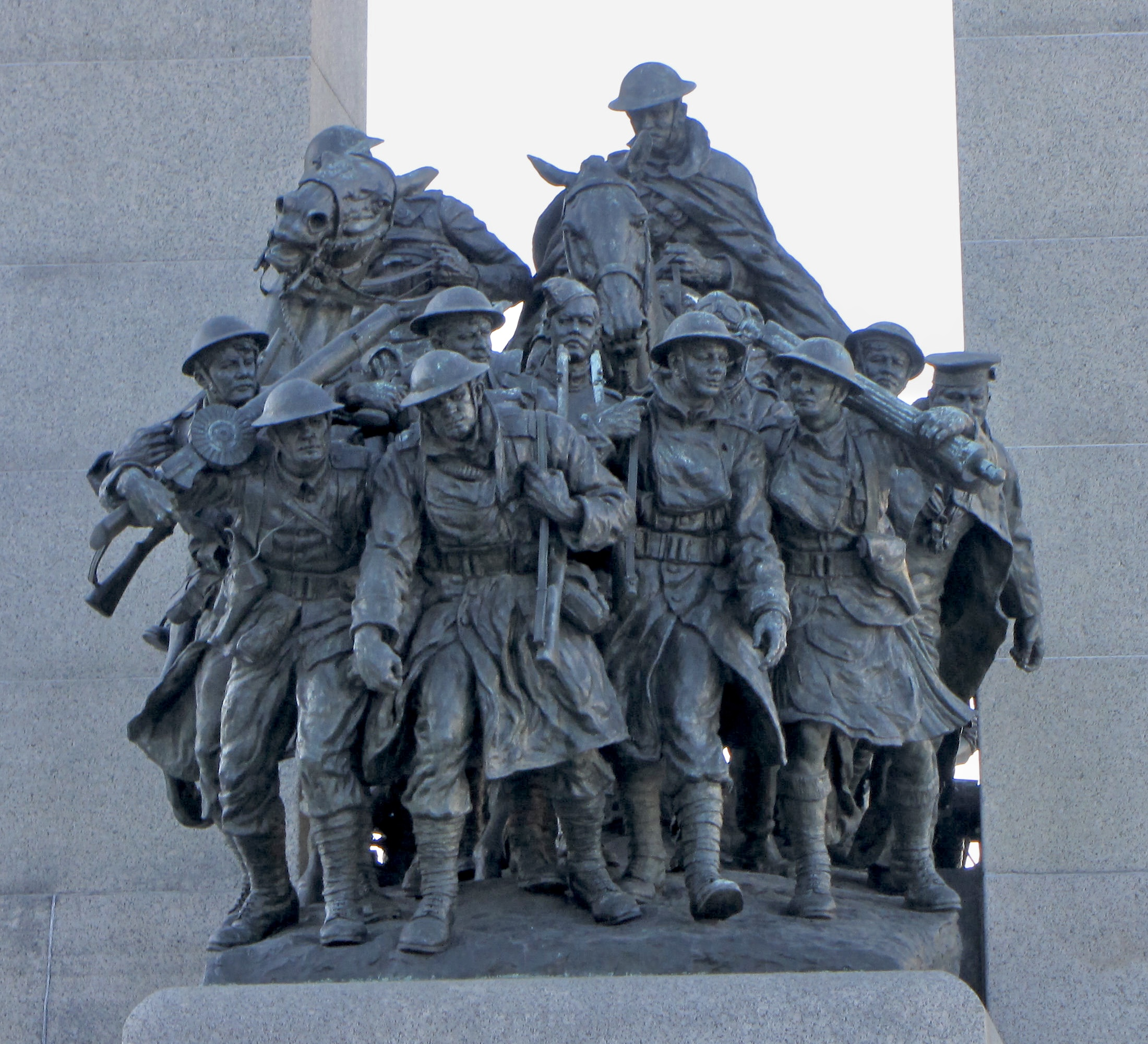
Soldiers

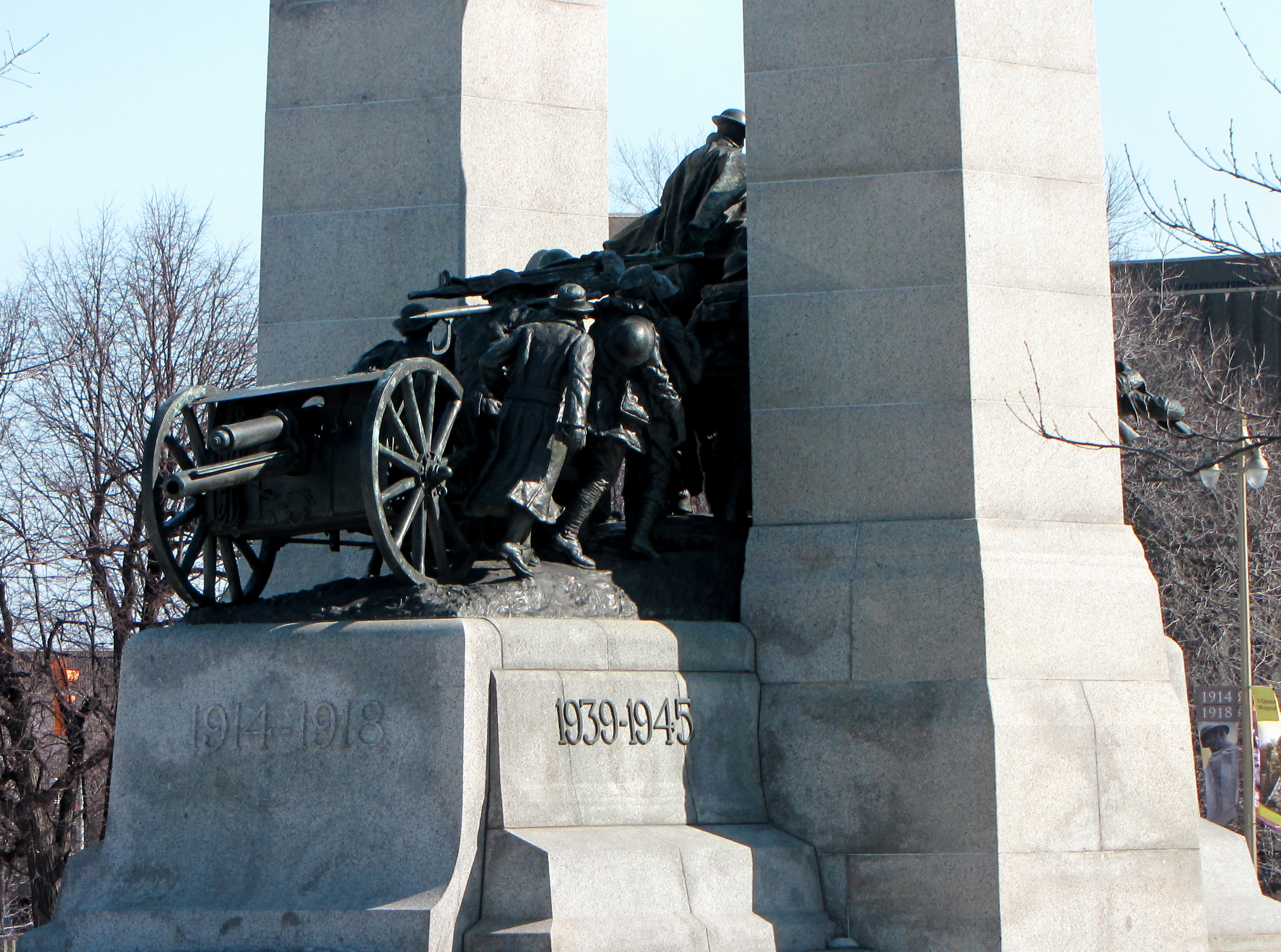
Rear

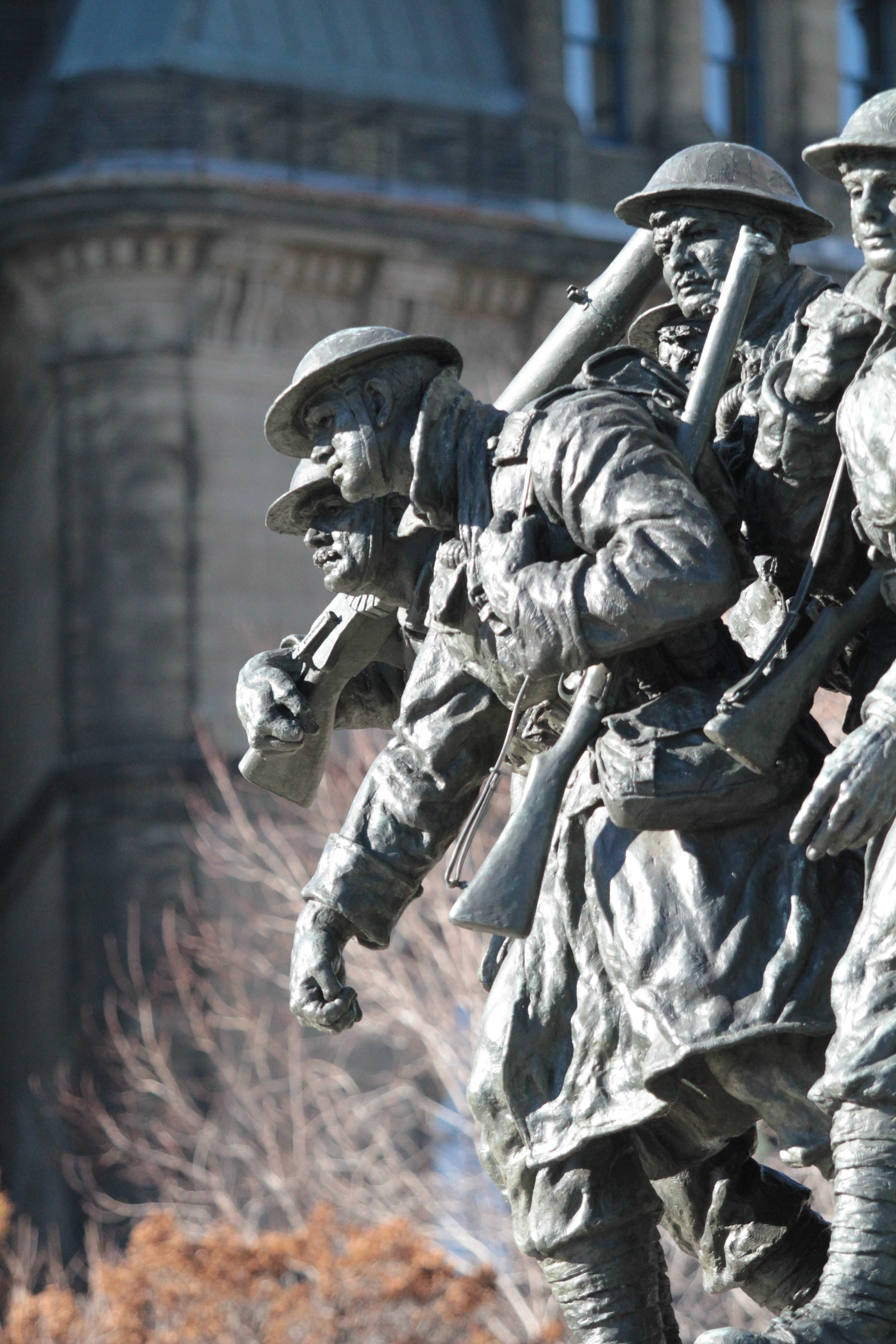
Side

== Other collaborations ==
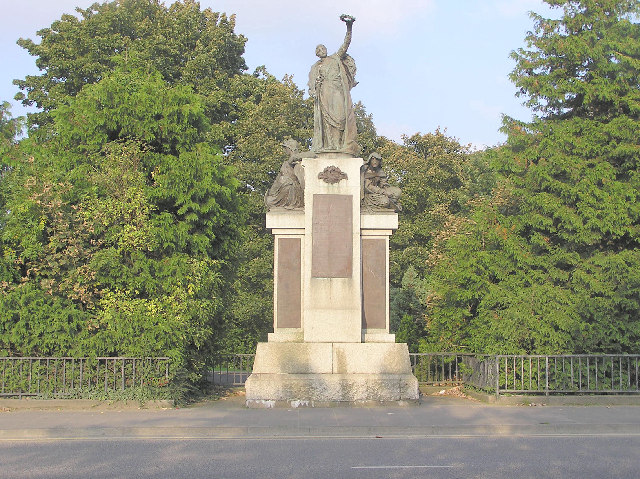
Royal Inniskilling Fusiliers South African War Memorial

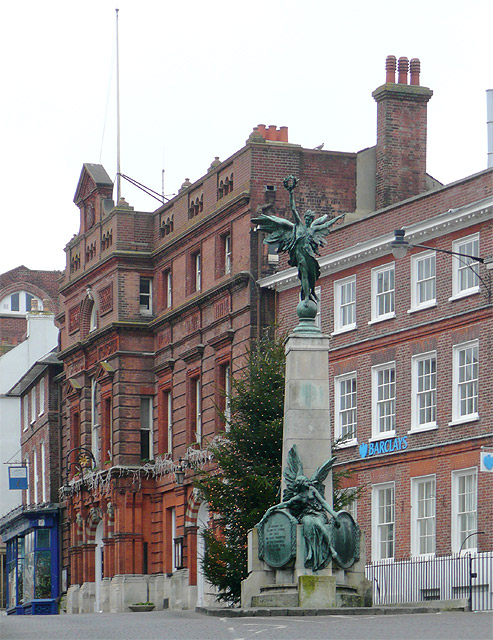
Lewes War Memorial

One of the first major pieces on which the March family collaborated was the Royal Inniskilling Fusiliers South African War Memorial. While Sydney was the primary sculptor, all of the March artists participated in the creation of this monument. It was dedicated to the Inniskilling Fusiliers who died in the Boer War (1899–1902). The family erected it in Northern Ireland in 1902. It was initially positioned on High Street in Omagh, County Tyrone, where it was unveiled by the Duchess of Abercorn on 25 November 1904. Considered a traffic hazard as traffic increased greatly, it was relocated in 1964 to Drumragh Avenue in Omagh.

Other art pieces on which the March family collaborated include the Lewes War Memorial, located at School Hill on High Street in Lewes, East Sussex, England. Vernon March was the primary sculptor. The war memorial features a central obelisk of Portland stone, upon which an angel representing Victory is perched, her arms raised, one hand holding a laurel wreath. Other bronze angels sit at the base of the monument; adjacent shields list the names of the deceased soldiers of World War I. The Lewes War Memorial was unveiled in 1922. It was rededicated in 1981 to include the deceased of World War II. It is also on the National Heritage List for England.

They made a war memorial at Sydenham, London, England, dedicated to the fallen soldiers of World War I and II who were employees of the south suburban gas works. The monument includes a bronze figure of Victory standing on a globe, with serpents at her feet. In addition, bronze plaques listed the names of the deceased soldiers, as well as those from the gas company who served. Sydney March was the primary sculptor for the Livesey Hall War Memorial, also referred to as the Sydenham War Memorial, which was unveiled by Lord Robert Cecil on 4 June 1920. It is on the National Heritage List for England. In October 2011, the three bronze plaques from the front of the memorial were stolen.

== Death ==
Sydney March died at age 92 in the second quarter of 1968 in the county of Kent, England. Most of the members of the March family, including parents George and Elizabeth, are interred at Saint Giles the Abbot Churchyard in Farnborough, Kent. Sydney's ashes were buried in the family plot on 22 June 1968. In 1922, Sydney had sculpted the bronze angel that marks the family graves. His last surviving sibling, Elsie March, died in 1974.

== Legacy ==
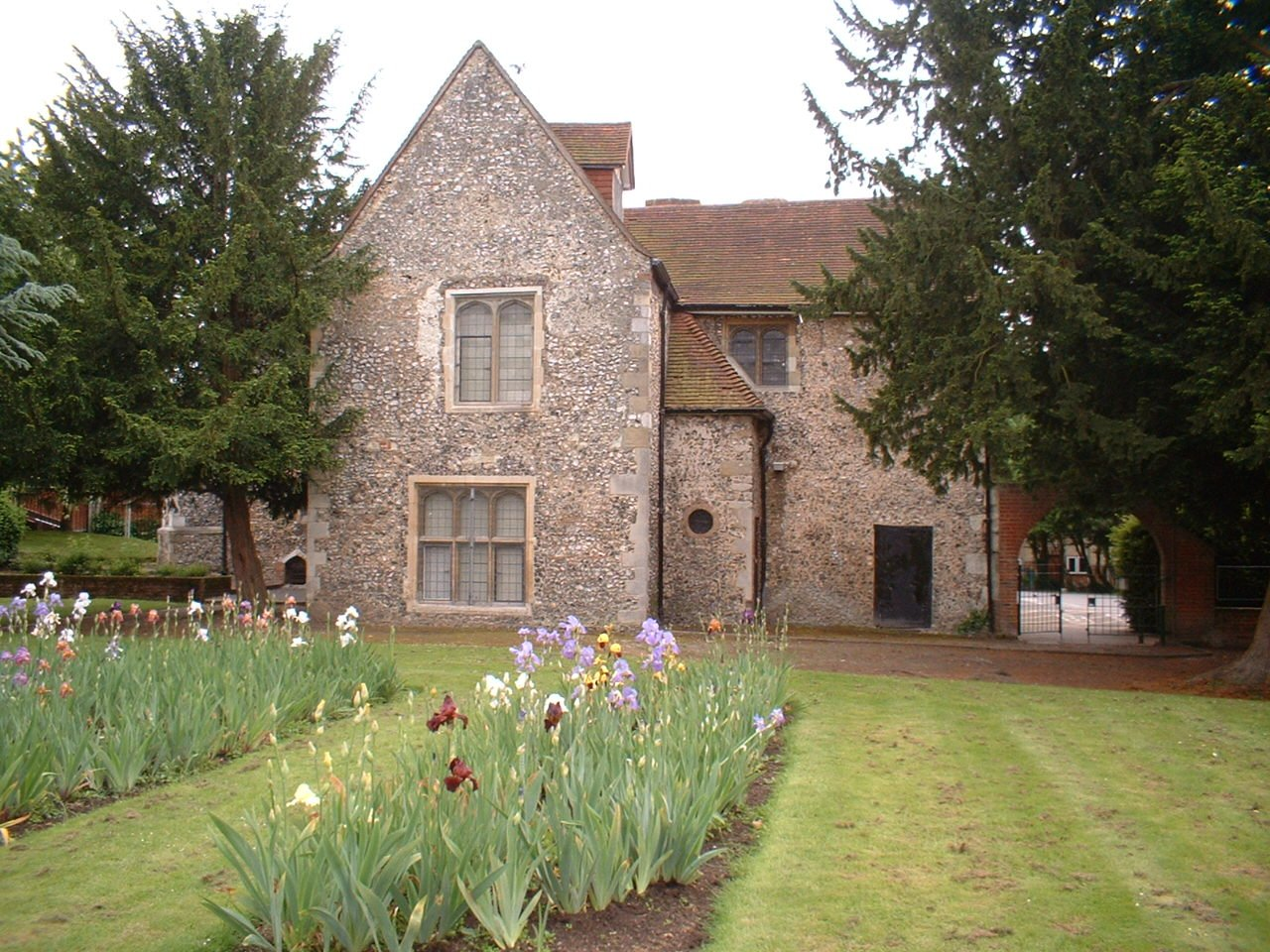
The Priory in Orpington

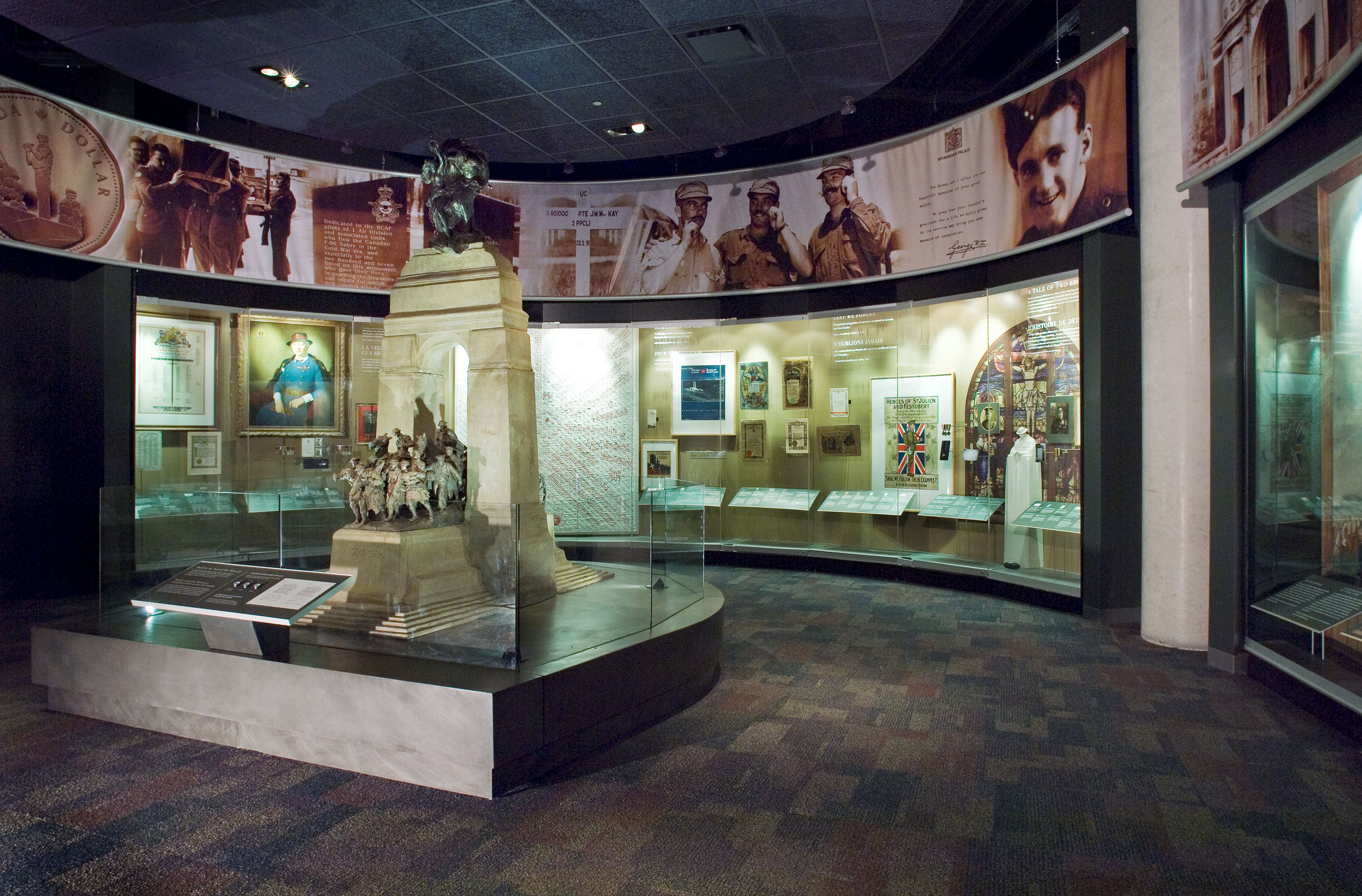
Royal Canadian Legion Hall of Honour in the Canadian War Museum

The March artists were widely known in their time. A black-and-white, silent movie was filmed in 1924 that explored the March artists at work in their studios at Goddendene. It has been reproduced by British Pathé.

In April 2011, the Chelsfield Village Voice, the monthly newsletter for the village of Chelsfield in the London Borough of Bromley, reported a recent talk on the March family of artists by local historian and author Paul Rason at the area historical society. He accompanied his lecture with photographs, including one of Sydney's equestrian statue of Lord Kitchener during construction. He had photographs of the March family home of Goddendene, and images of the bronze figures of the National War Memorial of Canada.

In 2011, an exhibition was held at the Bromley Museum at The Priory on Church Hill in Orpington. Featuring the work of local artists, the exhibit included scale models made by artists of the March family.

The National War Memorial of Canada has been the location for Canada's annual National Remembrance Day celebration since 1939. The original model for the National War Memorial is displayed in the Royal Canadian Legion Hall of Honour in the Canadian War Museum in Ottawa (pictured).
