= Neckinger Mills =

Former warehouse in London

General information
- Type: Originally industrial
- Location: London, England
- Coordinates: 51°29′53″N 0°04′19″W
- Completed: 1864

Listed Building – Grade II
- Official name: Neckinger Mills
- Designated: 10 August 2010
- Reference no.: 1393907

Neckinger Mills is a former warehouse owned by the firm of tanners Bevington & Sons in Bermondsey, London. The building, named for the Neckinger river is Grade II listed.

== History and description ==
The site was previously occupied by a paper mill and taken over by Bevington & Sons from 1806, which had been established around 1800. Over the course of the 19th century, the firm gained a reputation for their wares. It was run in the late 19th century by Samuel Bourne Bevington, chairman of the family firm who also served as the first mayor of the Metropolitan Borough of Bermondsey.

The current building was completed in 1864, and has since been converted to residential and commercial use. The buildings faces have large repeating windows, a feature which an adjacent modern residential development parallels.
