= Bromley Parish Church Memorial =

War memorial in London

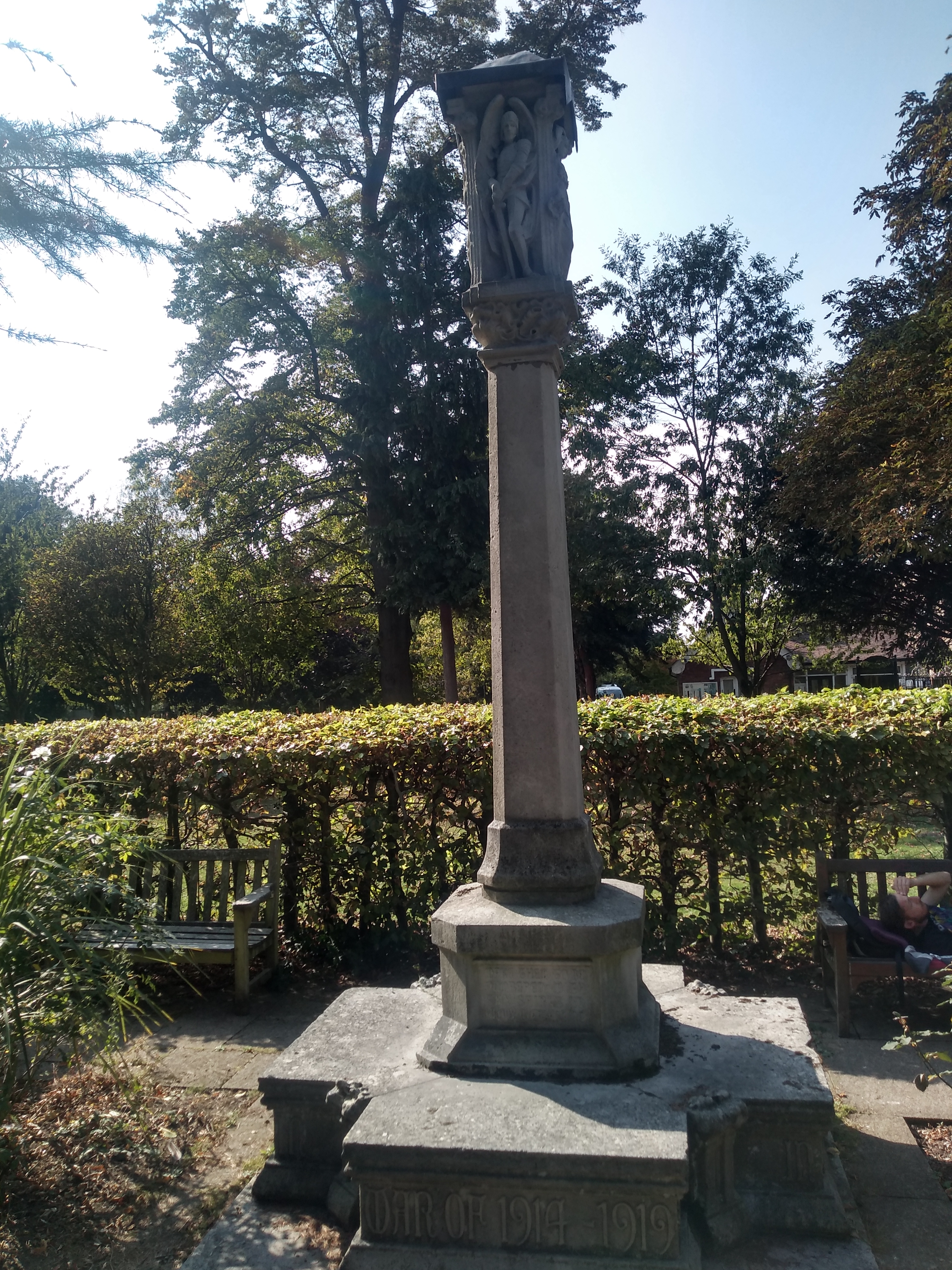
- Bromley Parish Church Memorial
- Interactive map of Bromley Parish Church Memorial
- Location: Bromley, Greater London, England
- Coordinates: 51°24′17.92″N 00°00′45.58″E
- Designer: Sydney March
- Type: War memorial
- Material: Portland stone
- Height: 5 m (16 ft)
- Completion date: 1921
- Opening date: 20 March 1921
- Dedicated to: Fallen parishioners of World War I

The Bromley Parish Church Memorial commemorates the deceased parishioners of World War I. The war memorial was designed and constructed by British sculptor Sydney March, of the March family of artists.

== Design ==
The Bromley Parish Church Memorial was erected in the churchyard of Saint Peter and Saint Paul, also known as Bromley Parish Church, on Church Road in Bromley, Greater London, England. In addition to a memorial cross in the churchyard, there was also a bronze plaque in the church which recorded the names of the fallen parishioners. The cross is made of Portland stone, a limestone quarried on the Isle of Portland in the English Channel. Its design is of the gothic period. The memorial cross is approximately five meters tall, with four carved figures. They represent Saint Michael, Saint George, Victory, and Peace. In addition, there are several inscriptions at the base of the cross: "In memory of the Men from this Church and Parish who gave their lives in the War of 1914–1919," "Make them to be numbered with the Saints in glory everlasting," and "Their names are recorded on a tablet in the Church." The memorial cross is positioned in a rose garden, surrounded by a high beech hedge.

== Dedication ==
The Bromley Parish Church Memorial commemorates the parishioners of St. Peter and St. Paul who lost their lives in World War I. It was unveiled on 20 March 1921 by Major General Sir John Raynsford Longley, K.C.M.G., C.B. (1867–1953). Longley served in the military from 1902 to 1923, and then came out of retirement to serve during World War II. The war memorial was dedicated by the Bishop of Rochester, Dr. John Reginald Harmer (1857–1944). An Anglican bishop, he served as Bishop of Adelaide before accepting the see of Rochester. After the unveiling and dedication of the memorial cross in the churchyard, the dignitaries and parishioners returned to the church where the bronze plaque was unveiled. This was followed by a service, led by the Vicar, the Reverend J. K. Wilson.

== Bombing and rebuilding ==
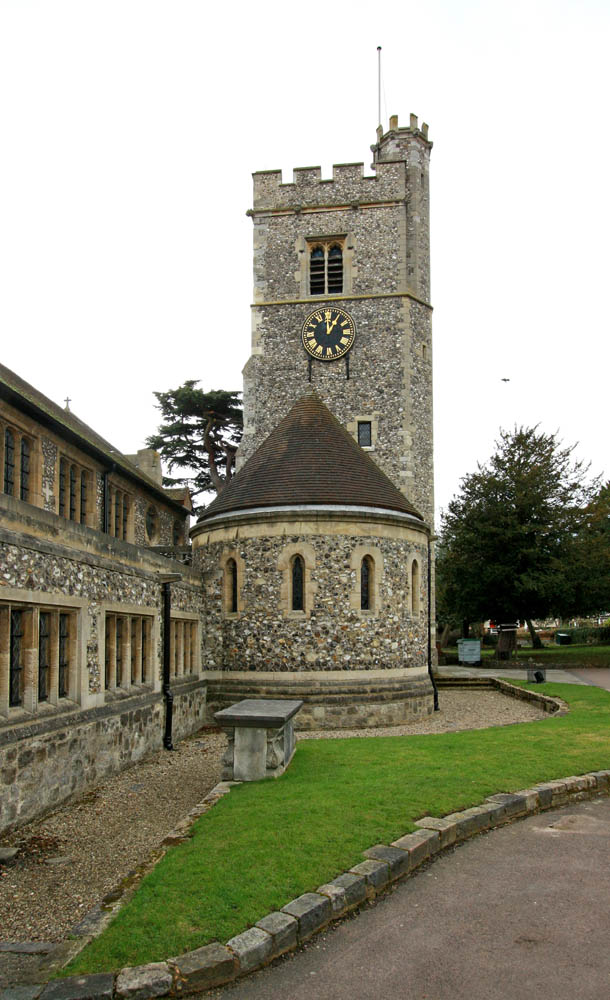
Church tower of Bromley Parish Church, St. Peter and St. Paul.

On the night of 16 April 1941, heavy bombing inflicted damage on many churches. Bromley Parish Church was nearly completely destroyed; the only portion which survived was the 14th-century tower. The bronze tablet inside St. Peter and St. Paul, which formed part of the Bromley Parish Church Memorial, was lost in the air raid. However, the memorial cross in the churchyard survived. Bromley Parish Church was rebuilt after World War II. The foundation stone for the church was laid on 13 October 1949 by Queen Elizabeth, then a princess. On 14 December 1957, construction of the new church was completed. The new bells of the church incorporated some of the metal from the original.

== Sculptor ==
Both the memorial cross in the churchyard and the bronze plaque in the church were designed and made by British sculptor Sydney March. The son of George and Elizabeth March, he was born in 1876 in Stoneferry, East Yorkshire, England. He was the second of nine children, eight of whom chose careers as artists. Sydney March exhibited thirteen times at The Exhibition of the Royal Academy of Arts. He and his siblings established art studios at their family home of Goddendene in Locksbottom, Farnborough, Kent. He was a prolific artist whose focus was war memorials, and sculptures of British royalty and contemporary figures. Sydney, together with his sister and brothers, completed the National War Memorial of Canada after the untimely death of their sibling, sculptor Vernon March, in 1930. Other monuments for which Sydney March is renowned include the Royal Inniskilling Fusiliers South African War Memorial in Northern Ireland, the United Empire Loyalist Monument in Canada, and the Lancaster Monument in England. His smaller-scale works include portrait busts of King Edward VII and Cecil John Rhodes, both in London's National Portrait Gallery.

== See also ==
- Bromley War Memorial
