= St Peter and St Paul, Bromley =

Church in the London Borough of Bromley

- Bromley Parish Church
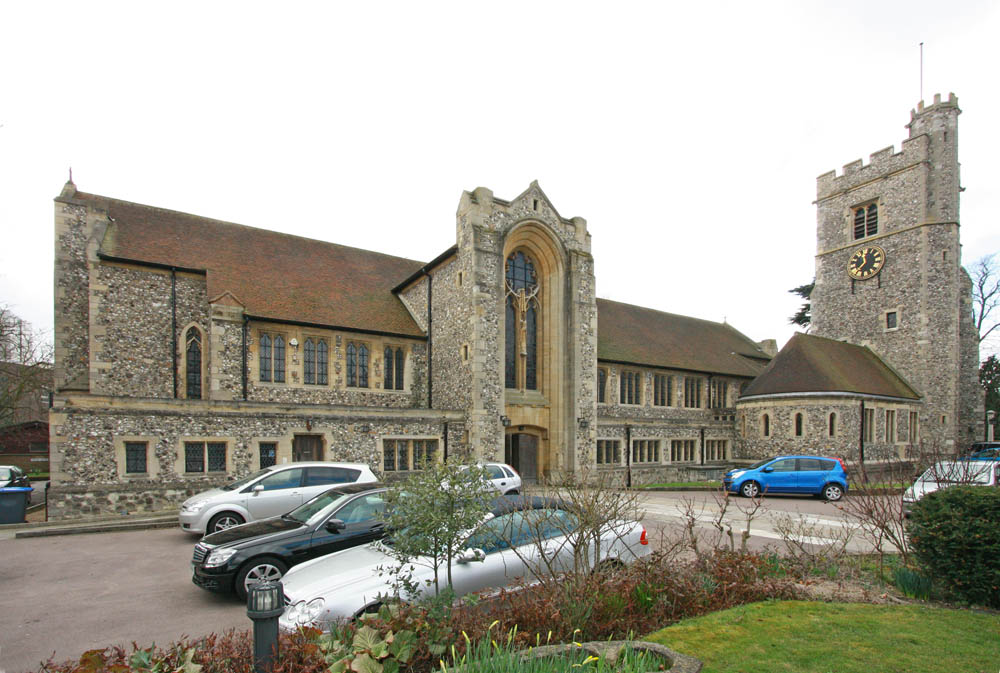
- St Peter and St Paul, Bromley
- 51.4050°N 0.0131°E
- OS grid reference: TQ 40121 69245
- Location: Church Road, Bromley, Kent BR2 0EG
- Country: England
- Denomination: Church of England
- Website: bromleyparishchurch.org

History
- Dedicated: 1957

Architecture
- Architect: J. Harold Gibbons
- Years built: 1949

Administration
- Diocese: Rochester
- Archdeaconry: Bromley and Bexley
- Deanery: Bromley
- Parish: Bromley

Clergy
- Vicar: Rev. James Harratt

Listed Building – Grade II*
- Designated: 10 January 1955
- Reference no.: 1084373

St Peter and St Paul is a church in the town of Bromley, Borough of Bromley, in south east London. Known familiarly as Bromley Parish Church, it is not far from Bromley High Street and approximately halfway between Bromley North and Bromley South railway stations. The church is part of the Diocese of Rochester within the Church of England. Largely destroyed by bombing during the Second World War, St Peter and St Paul was rebuilt in the 1950s. It has been Grade II* listed since 1955.

== History ==
=== Previous church ===
The pre-World War II church, generally in the Perpendicular style with a square embattled tower having a turret at one of the angles, had its north aisle rebuilt in 1792 and was completely refurbished and enlarged in 1830. Virtually the whole church—with the exception of the tower—was demolished by a bomb on the night of 16 April 1941. Arthur Gresley Hellicar (1835–1905) was Vicar of Bromley from 1865 to 1905.

=== Present church ===
On St Edward the Confessor’s Day, 13 October 1949, the foundation stone of the new church was laid by then Princess Elizabeth (later Queen Elizabeth II). Eight years later, the last phase of rebuilding was complete and on 14 December 1957 the new church was consecrated by the Bishop of Rochester, Christopher Maude Chavasse. The present church incorporates the medieval tower and much of the flint and fragments of the original stone building.

== Items of interest ==
=== Stained glass ===
Several of the modern windows (including two illustrated below) were designed by M. E. Aldrich Rope, a prolific Arts and Crafts stained glass artist. The Baptistery window is by Clare Dawson, her pupil and co-worker.

=== Organ ===
The organ, built in 1991 by J. W. Walker & Sons Ltd, was designed to support congregational worship, to accompany a traditional choir, and as a recital instrument for use alone or with other instruments. It has three manuals and pedals, 40 speaking stops, six couplers, and three tremulants, and comprises 55 ranks with 2,708 pipes. The manual and pedal actions of the organ are mechanical; the stop control is electro-magnetic with a solid state capture combination action. The instrument was made and first assembled in Walker's workshops in Brandon, before being dismantled and installed in the church—it weighs approximately 12 tons. The organ cases, gallery woodwork and carved pipeshades were designed by David Graebe.

The Specification is below;

PEDAL ORGAN (30 notes)

16' Open Diapason

16' Subbass

10 2/3' Quint

8' Principal

8' Bass Flute

4' Choral Bass

IV Mixture

32' Contra Trombone (ext.)

16' Trombone

8' Trumpet

Choir to Pedal

Great to Pedal

Swell to Pedal

CHOIR ORGAN (58 notes)

8' Open Diapason

8' Stopped Diapason

4' Principal

4' Open Flute

2 2/3' Nasard

2' Gemshorn

13/5' Tierce

III Fourniture

8' Trumpet

8' Cromorne

Swell to Choir

GREAT ORGAN (58 notes)

16' Bourdon

8' Open Diapason

8' Chimney Flute

4' Principal

4' Harmonic Flute

2' Fifteenth

IV Fourniture

16' Double Trumpet

8' Trumpet

V Cornet (from middle C)

Choir to Great

Swell to Great

SWELL ORGAN (58 notes)

8' Diapason

8' Voila da Gamba

8' Voix Celeste

8' Stopped Flute

4' Gemshorn

2' Flageolet

IV Mixture

16' Bassoon

8' Trumpet

8' Hautboy

=== Tombs ===
Famous people buried at St Peter and St Paul have included:

- John Yonge or Young, bishop of Rochester
- Elizabeth Johnson, wife of Samuel Johnson: her memorial was salvaged after World War II and re-erected in the rebuilt church On Easter Monday April 23, 1753, Samuel Johnson attended church here "to take leave of Tetty", he was relieved having done so and was glad to have felt a cooling of his desire to have a new wife.
- John Hawkesworth, writer, editor, and friend of Johnson
- Zachary Pearce, bishop of Rochester
- John Gifford, British political writer and supporter of Pitt the Younger
- Sir Claude and Sir Edward Scott, first and second baronets of Lychet Minster

== Gallery ==
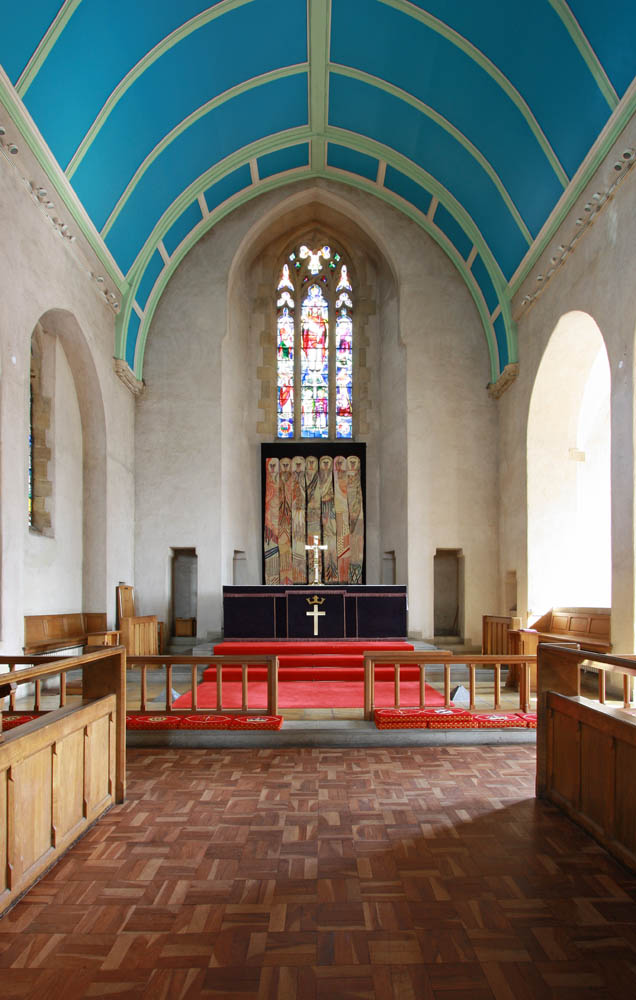
Altar

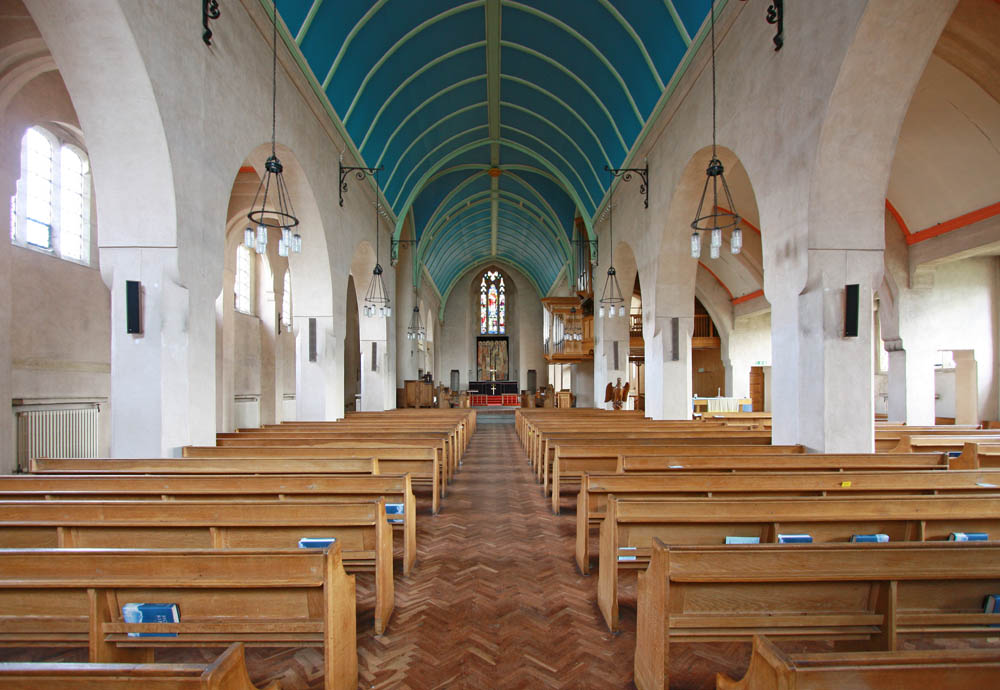
Interior looking east

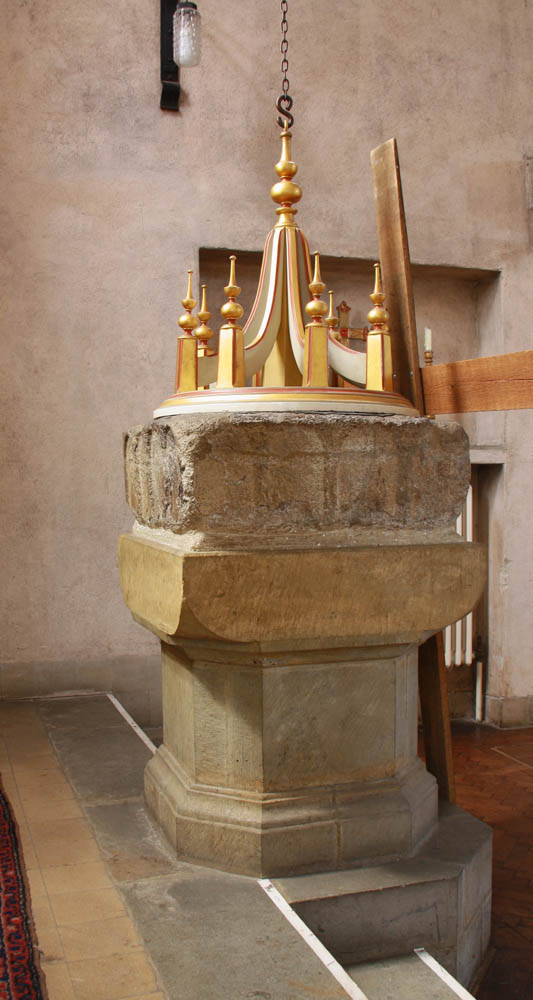
Baptismal font

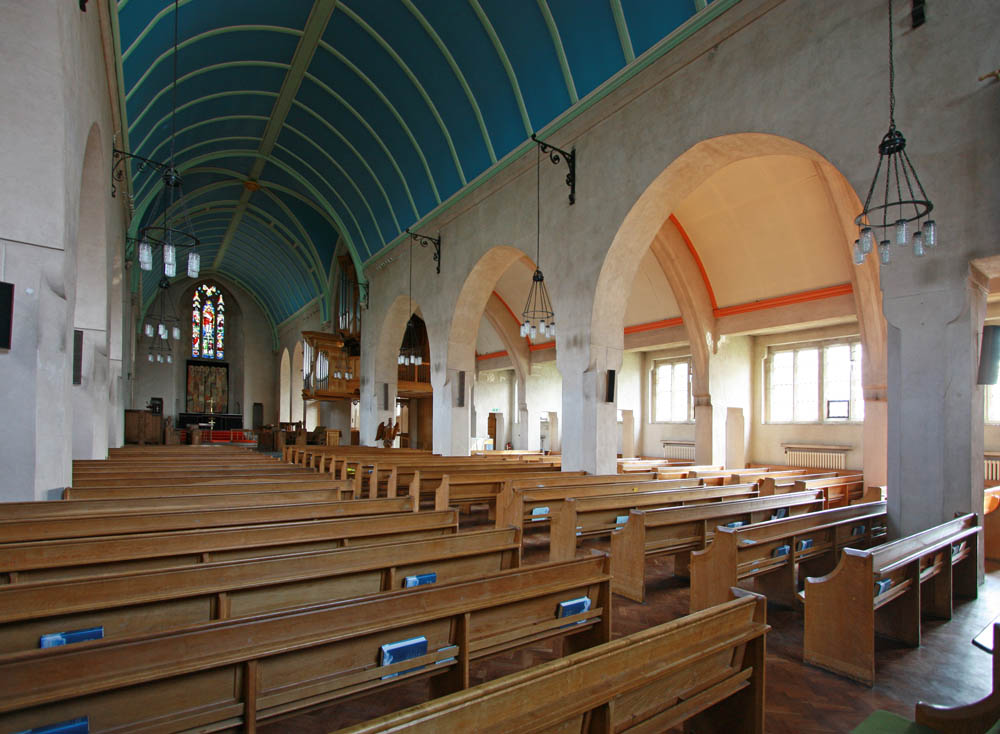
Interior

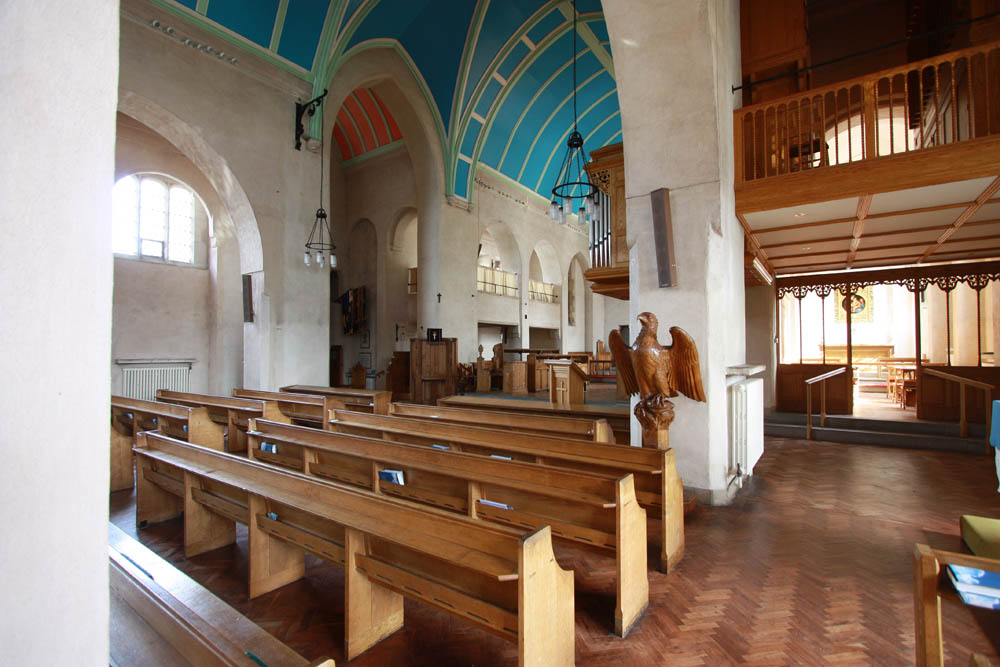
Interior

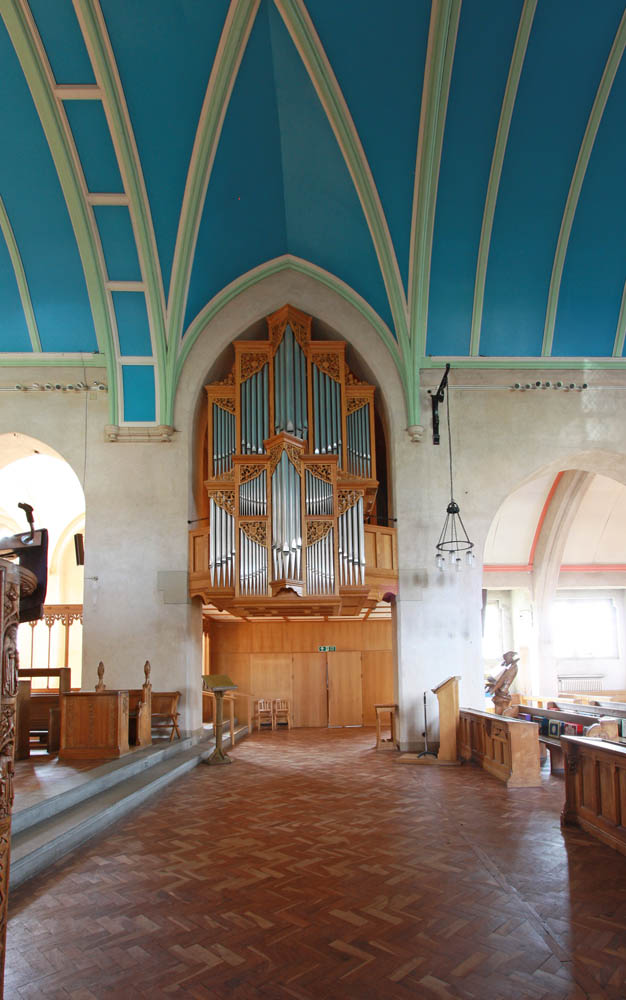
Organ

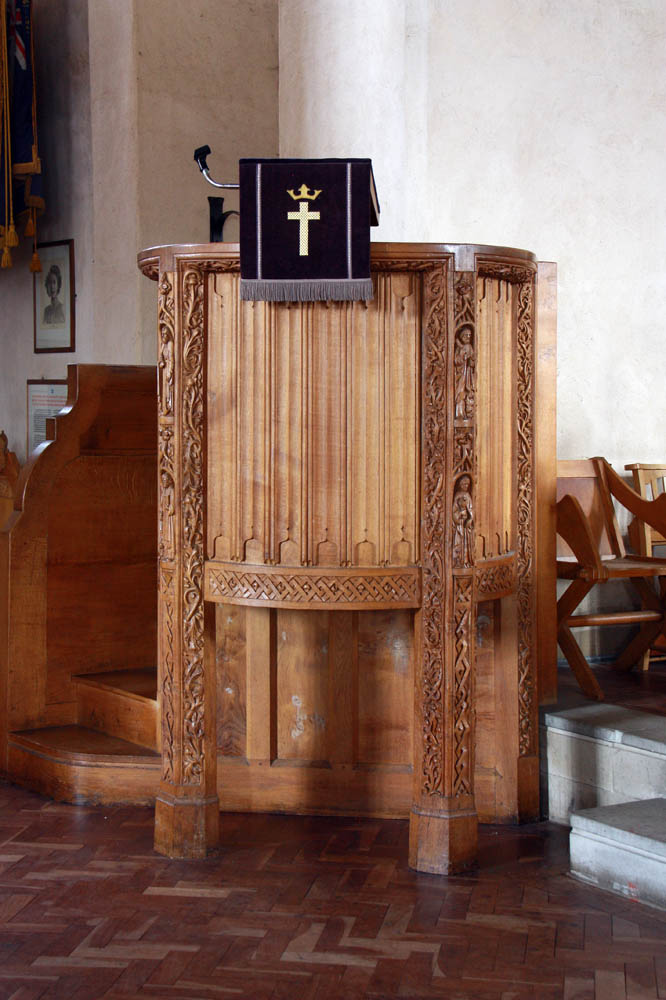
Pulpit

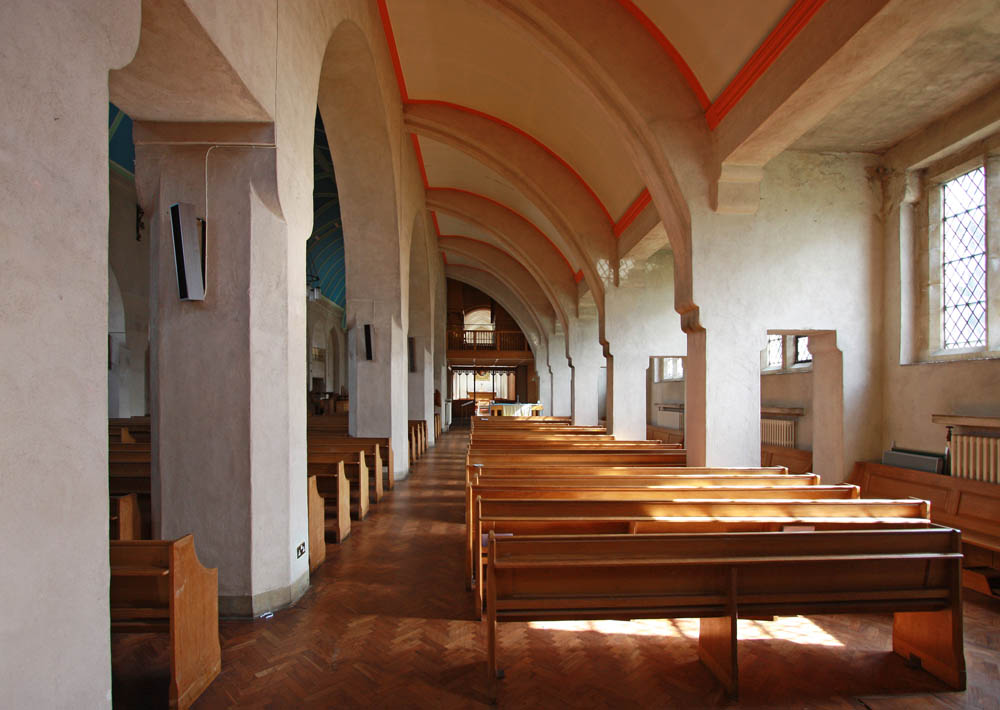
South aisle

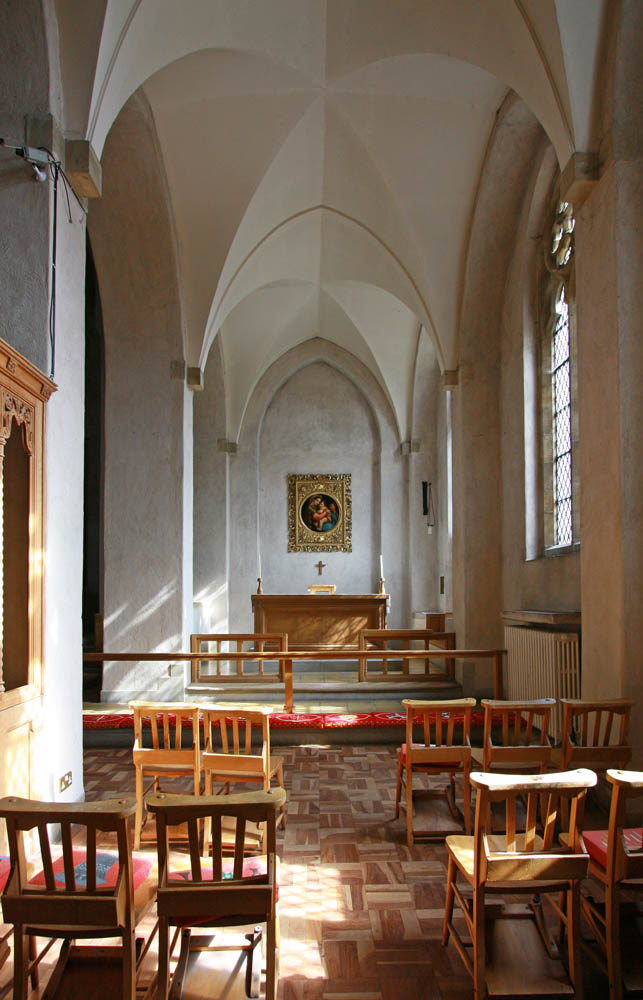
South chapel

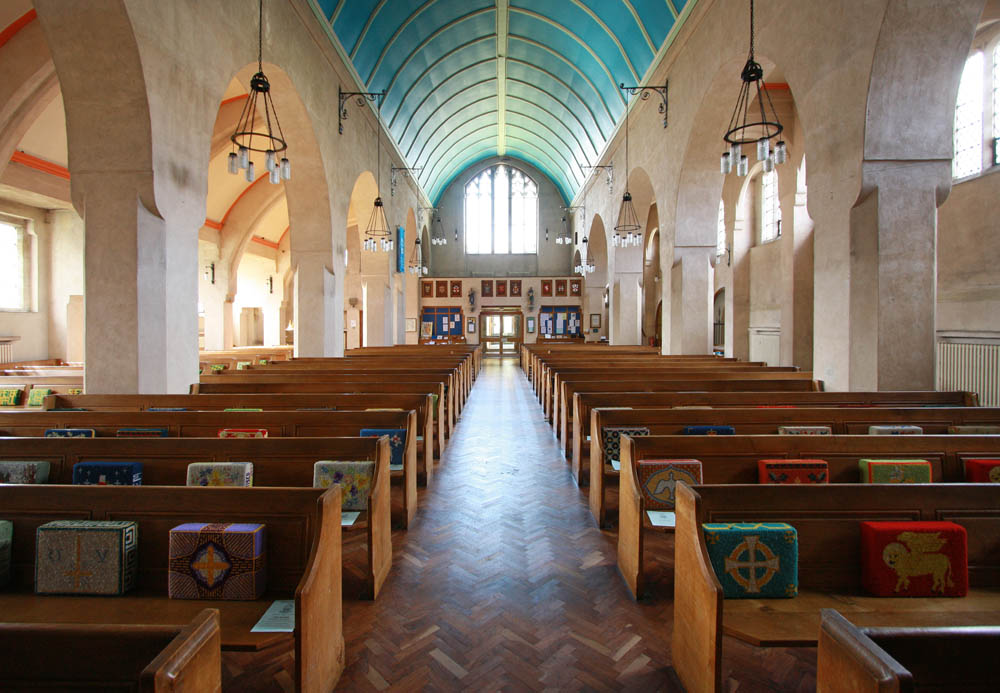
Interior looking west

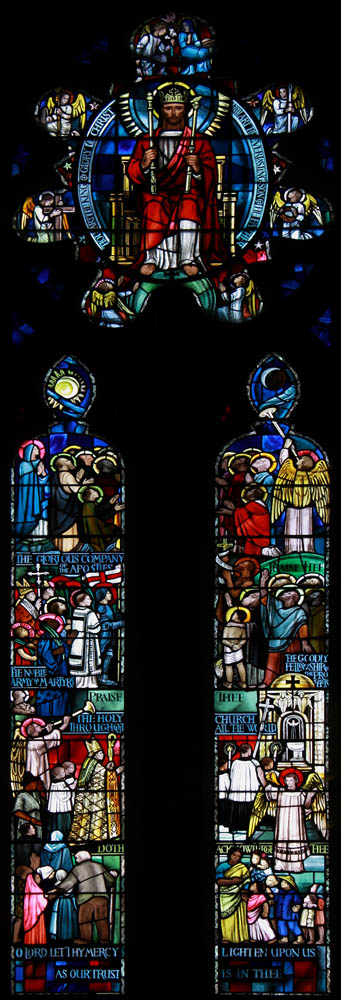
Stained glass window

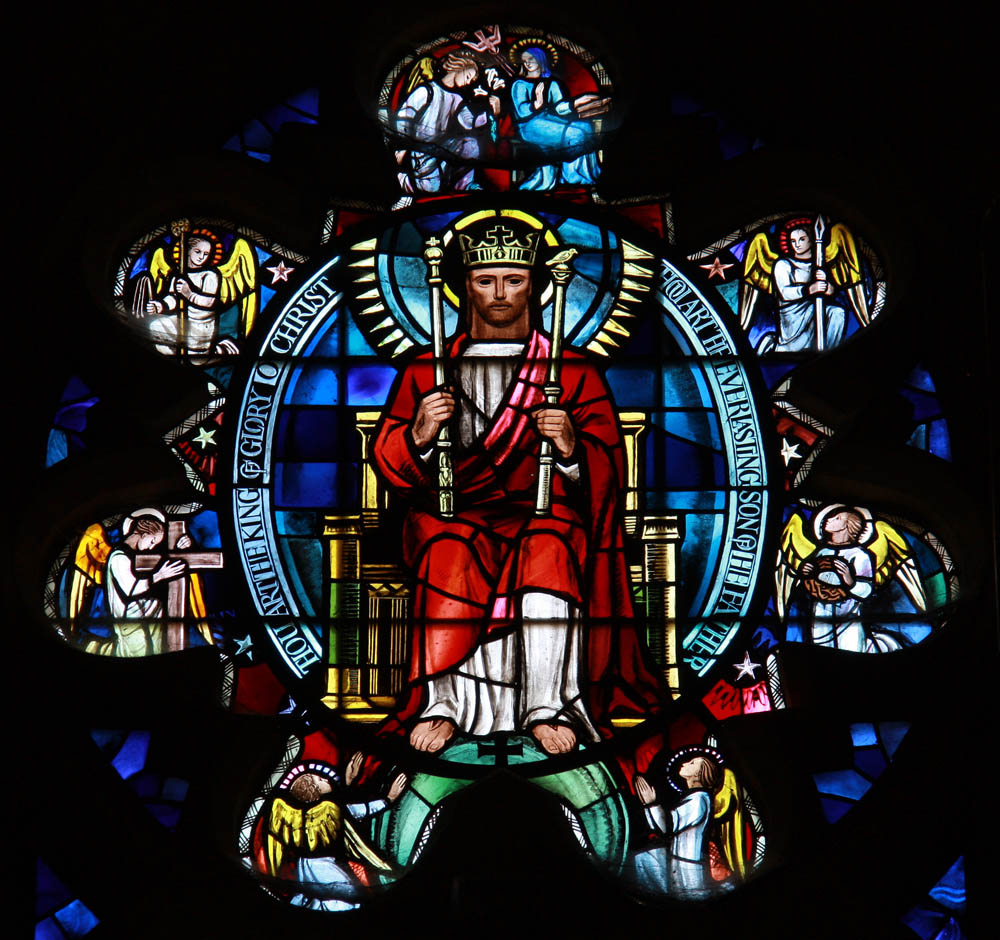
Detail of stained glass window depicting Christ the King

== See also ==
- Bromley Parish Church Memorial
