= Samuel Bourne Bevington =

British businessman and local politician (1832–1907)

Samuel Bourne Bevington in 1901

Samuel Bourne Bevington (1832–1907) was a British army officer, businessman, philanthropist and local politician in Bermondsey, London. Serving as first mayor of the newly established Metropolitan Borough of Bermondsey, Bevington was widely popular.

== Biography ==
Bevington was born in 1832 to James Buckingham Bevington, a member of the Bevington family of leathersellers. Their Neckinger Mills was a prominent tannery and employed a large number of people in the Bermondsey area. He was educated at the Quaker School in Croydon and studied at King's College London.

Bevington worked in the family's firm from 1851, becoming chairman by 1892. He served as Warden and Master of the Leathersellers' Company and was involved in the founding of the company's school in Bermondsey as chairman of its predecessor, a department of Herold's Institute.

In 1859, Bevington joined the 1st Surrey Rifles and served as the Colonel of the 3rd Volunteer Battalion in the Queen's West Surrey Regiment from 1884 until 1899. He was also a member of the Swedenborg Society and served as its president in 1890. He became mayor of the newly created Metropolitan Borough of Bermondsey in 1900. Widely popular, he served two terms and was invited to serve a third term but declined owing to poor health.

Bevington is perhaps best known for promoting the betterment of conditions for the people of Bermondsey, particularly in education. His popularity was significant but largely confined to his own area. Bevington died in 1907 with his life and work for the people of the area commemorated by statue of Bevington stands on Tooley Street nearby to Bermondsey.
