= Stoneferry =

Suburb of Kingston upon Hull, England

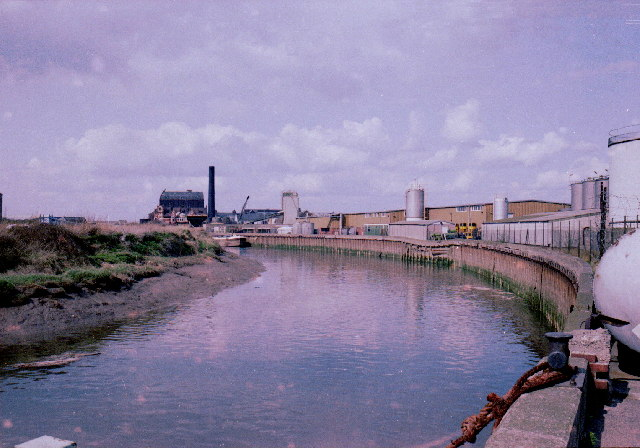
River Hull at Stoneferry Bridges looking north (1983)

Stoneferry (archaic Stone-Ferry, or Stone ferry) is a suburb of Kingston upon Hull, East Riding of Yorkshire, England. It was formerly a small hamlet on the east bank of the River Hull, the site of a ferry, and, after 1905, a bridge. The area is primarily industrial, and is situated on the east bank of the river, as well as close by areas on the west bank.

Stoneferry Road (A1033 section) travels south through Stoneferry and Wilmington towards the centre of Hull. Ferry Lane (eastern end of the A1165) runs east for a short distance from Stoneferry bridge to meet Stoneferry Road.

== Geography ==
The boundaries of the Stoneferry area are approximately formed by the River Hull to the west beyond which are the areas of Sculcoates (south-west) and Clough Road/Newland (west); to the north is the post 1970s Sutton Fields Industrial, with Bransholme housing estate beyond. To the north-east and east are the housing estates of Sutton Ings and Garden Village; whilst to the south is the industrial area of Wilmington, of similar character to Stoneferry.

The A1033 Stoneferry Road runs north–south through the area, connected with the east end of the A1165 Clough Road/Ferry Lane via the bridges over the River Hull. Chamberlain Road, running east to the Garden Village is the areas other main road. The Hull Docks Branch runs south-east through the southern part of the area, and also has a crossing of the river.

The Stoneferry area contains a large amount of industrial development, generally focused along the banks of the River Hull, which includes manufacturing, warehousing and retail sites. The eastern part has some housing, including late Victoria era/early Edwardian era, pre- and post-Second World War, and late 20th century houses. Also in the eastern part are some managed natural spaces.

=== Geology ===
There is an outcropping bed of harder rock or other agglomerate in the river bed (which is usually clay, silt and till on the River Hull) near Stoneferry.

== History ==
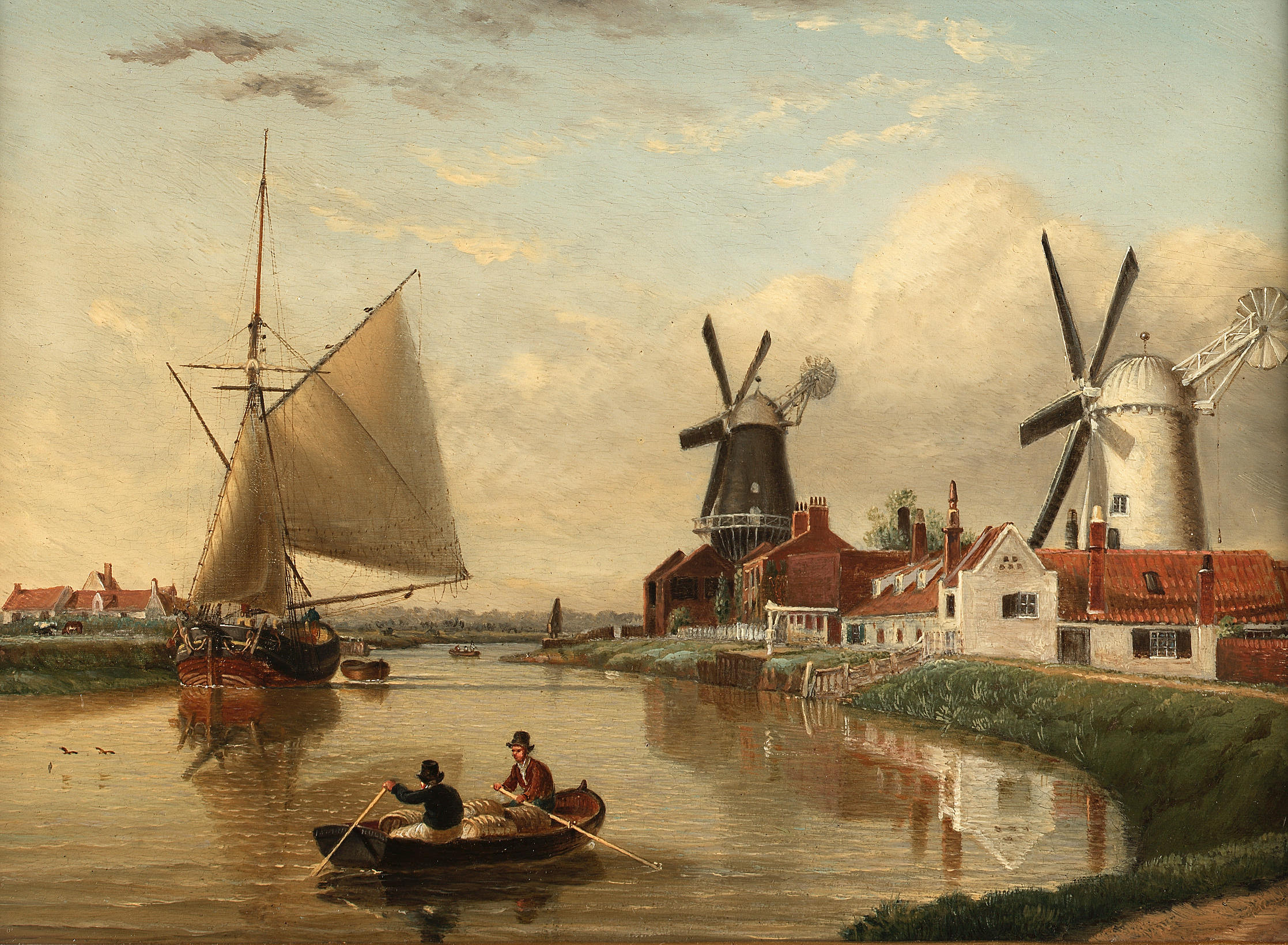
A painting of Stoneferry during the early 19th century by John Ward

A river crossing at Stoneferry is recorded as early as 1269, being referred to as 'Stanfordrak', (Note: It has been suggested that the name Stanfordrak is misplaced, and refers to the mouth of the River Hull on the Humber Estuary.) the name Stoneferry began to be used in the 14th century.

The hamlet originally formed part of the parish of Wawne; it later became part of the parish of Sutton on Hull.

In 1845 a water works was constructed at Stoneferry on the west bank of the river to meet the demands of the town of Hull; a public baths was also built on the site. (Note: The baths were supplied with hot water from the steam engines used to pump the water.) Previously supplies had come from chalk springs near Anlaby. the advice had been sought of Thomas Wicksteed, the engineer, who thought they could not provide sufficient volume, and suggested that water should be taken from the River Hull, at ebb, (Note: The River Hull is tidal far beyond Stoneferry) when it was thought the flow of the river would be sufficient to render the water fresh. Initial analyses suggested that the water quality would be very good, but this was found not to be the case, with complaints of poor quality water, with the water being muddy and brackish. (Note: The use of water sourced from the River Hull at Stoneferry appears to have a negative effect on the health of the inhabitants of Hull. In 'A handboook to Hull and the East Riding of Yorkshire' (1922) Thomas Sheppard noted "In that year [1845] the death-rate (as quoted by a former Town Clerk, Mr. C. S. Todd) was 23¾ per 1000. In the latter part of the same year, new works were opened at Stoneferry, giving a service from the River Hull, which is tidal, and which received more or less contamination by sewage, and the death rate immediately rose, in 1846, to 33½ per 1000, or by nearly 50 per cent. In 1847 it was 31½; in 1852, 30¼. In 1864 the river supply was abandoned and cut off, and in 1865 the death rate fell to only 22 per 1000 !".)

A cholera outbreak occurred in Hull in 1849, and sources of a better supply were sought; Thomas Wickstead and others had maintained further water could not be got from the springs near Anlaby. It was William Warden, a local resident of Hessle who claimed that an artesian well in the area would give sufficient supply; (Note: He had previously had success supplying water to the railway at Hessle from wells.) in the 1860s boreholes were sunk, and the Springhead Pumping Station established; the water from the boreholes was used to supply the Stoneferry water works and water no longer taken from the river; the water supply problem was solved. The initial cost of the Stoneferry waterworks was £58,000 (with two 60 hp steam engines), this eventually rose to £92,808 with two further engines of 170 and 220 hp, and additional water treatment facilities. Around 1891 the pumping station at Stoneferry ceased to be used to pump water to Hull; by 1910 the works was in disuse.

During the latter part of the 19th century the area between Hull and Stoneferry began to be developed industrially, and in 1882 Stoneferry became part of the municipal borough of Kingston upon Hull; the industrialisation continued leading to a completely industrial landscape along the River Hull banks and in Stoneferry itself by the 20th century. The Hull and Hornsea Railway was opened passing roughly north through the eastern extreme of the Stoneferry area in the 1860s and the Hull and Barnsley Railway was constructed across the southern part of the area in the 1880s, curving south-east from a crossing of the River Hull.

Urban development beyond the original hamlet took place during the decades at the beginning of the 20th century (1890–1910) around the south-western end of Leads Road, and on Lorraine Street. Further housing development took place starting in the late 1930s between Stoneferry Road and the Foredyke Stream (Woodhall Street area), and between the Fordyke and the Hull and Hornsea railway line (Rockford Avenue area); as well as around previously developed housing; and later along Sutton Road to the north of Stoneferry. The development along Sutton Road was demolished in the 1970s, and replaced by the Sutton Fields industrial estate. In the 1990s a small housing estate was built between Stoneferry Road and the former Foredyke Drain, north of the Stoneferry railway branch. As of 2012 the area is a mixture of mostly industrial usage, as well as housing, and green spaces. In 2011 the area 'Rockford Fields', remnant of the pastureland of Sutton Ings was designated as a local nature reserve.

In 2012 property developer Barratt obtained planning permission to build around 100 homes on playing fields on land bequeathed by James Reckitt for recreational use by employees of Reckitts of Hull; the scheme had strong local opposition, and was rejected in 2011 by Hull councillors, but was allowed on appeal to the Planning Inspectorate.

=== Industry ===
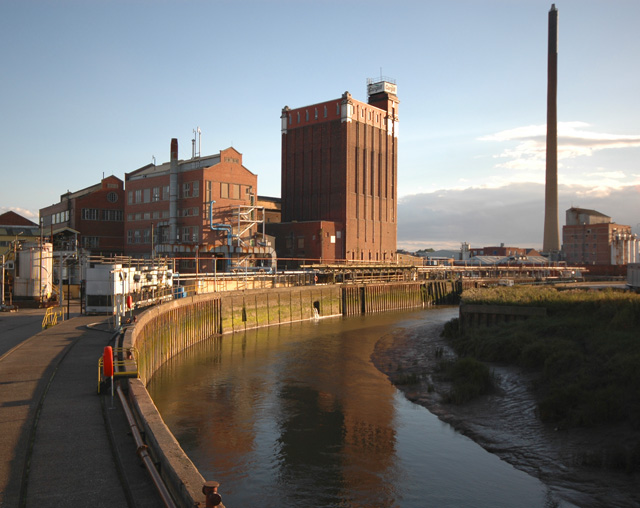
The Isis Oil Mills (Cargil plc), and Reckitt's chimney (August 2008)

By the 1850s there was a whiting and oil mill in Stoneferry, by 1910 development was continuous along the River Hull banks, consisting of mills for seed oils, whiting, and associated industries such as paint and pigment works, as well as a cement works immediately south of Ferry Lane.

In 1884 the Hull-based company Reckitt & Sons established a factory at Morley Street to manufacture synthetic Ultramarine. This later became part of Reckitt & Colman, and was later sold to Yule Catto becoming Holliday Pigments. In 2003 it had a capacity of about 9,000 t.p.a. The factory's 463-foot (141 m) chimney, the tallest structure in Hull, known as Reckitt's chimney was used to discharge Sulphur dioxide into the atmosphere, a Flue gas desulphurisation plant was installed at the beginning of the 21st century, making the chimney practically obsolete. The plant closed in 2007 due to restructuring.

A cement works was established by Martin Brown & Co. in 1878, the works was acquired, and became Skelsey & Co. (1885), later Skelsey's Adamant Cement Co. Ltd. (1890); the works was replaced by the Port Barton plant in the 1890s, and the site was incorporated into Reckitt's Ultramarine works. Another cement works was established in 1889 as Hull Portland Cement Co., with rotary kilns first installed in 1903, after several changes of ownership it became part of Earles cement in 1911. Production ended in 1927 due to restructuring at Earles, and the site was used for aggregate storage with wharfside rail mounted cranes, until being redeveloped into a retail trade park Medina Park at the turn of the 21st century.

In 1912 the large Isis Oil Mills was built for Wray, Sanderson & Co. (Note: Wray Sanderson & Co., in 1947 became part of the conglomerate Premier Oil and Cake Mills, acquired by Croda in 1967, acquired by Cargil in 1985 from Croda Premier Oils.) (now a listed building). Other oil seed mills and works in Stoneferry no longer extant include the 'King's Mill' (est. c. 1885); (Note: King's Mill. South of Ferry Lane, and the later cement works, north of Isis mills. Established by Barton and Waterhouse (c. 1882); later Lever Bros. (1920); burnt down 1922 and rebuilt; later BOCM (1930). Seed milling ceased after 1930. Later as Benninga (Hull) Ltd. (margarine).) HOMCO (Hull Oil Manufacturing Co., Ltd.); (Note: Founded 1888. North(west) of Ann Watson Street. Early user of solvent extraction for oil seed processing, and early processor of castor seed. Soap and oilseed cake manufactured from 1906 and 1907. Developed into a large mill by c. 1920. Acquired by BOCM 1922, closed 1953.) and the Premier Oil Extracting Mill. (Note: Established 1896 as General Extracting Co., initially unsuccessful, and put into administration, later owner by Joseph Rank (1904), from 1906, as Premier Oil Extracting Mills Ltd.. Amalgamated into Premier Oil and Cake Mills Ltd. (1919). Between Ann Watson Street and Ferry Lane.) The latter two had developed into large oil seed mills by the 1920s, and both were early users of solvent extraction. To the north-west of HOMCO was a paint works, the Stoneferry works of Hangers paints. (Note: Hanger's Paints; previously Hanger, Watson and Harris, previously Hamilton, Hanger and Watson (White's general and commercial directory of Hull, 1882; FBI Register of British Manufacturers, 1924; ditto 1954). Works established by 1880s.)

A short branch off the Hull-Hornsea railway line was built (c. 1913) which connected to Stoneferry goods station (53.7688°N 0.3259°W), as well as the Premier Oil and Cake Mills north of Ferry Lane. The line had completely closed by the 1970s.

To the north of the traditionally industrialised area the 243 acres (98 ha) Sutton Fields Industrial Estate was established by the City Council in the 1970s.

=== Bridges ===
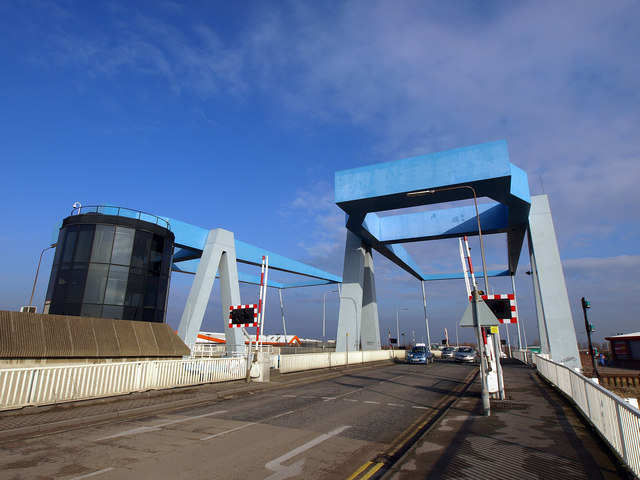
Stoneferry Bridges, and control tower (February 2009)

A bridge at Stoneferry was proposed in the 18th century, but was opposed in Parliament by interested parties in Beverley due to concerns of it blocking the navigable river. In 1905 a swing bridge was built, constructed by the Motherwell Bridge Company. The total length was 198 feet 8 inches (60.55 m) in two spans, with the moveable span giving an opening of 60 feet 8 inches (18.49 m), built at a cost of £10,261 for the ironwork and machinery, and £7,450 for stonework. Additionally a subway was built 38 feet (12 m) below the river bed, carrying water, gas and electricity utilities.

The 1905 bridge included fittings for a tram tracks – a tramway from Hull to Stoneferry had been partially built but never completed. (Note: Tracks across the bridge could have connected via Clough Road to the tram system in west Hull at Beverley Road/Cottingham Road junction, though this route was never formally approved.)

The 1905 swing bridge was replaced by a pair of 'Shadoof' type bascule lifting bridges, authorised in 1987 and built about 15 yards (14 m) north of the earlier bridge between 1988 and 1991.

== Thistleton ==
53.76196°N 0.32261°W

Thistleton was a small place approximately ½ mile south-east of Stoneferry, adjacent to the Foredyke Drain. In the first half of the 20th century the urban growth of Hull surrounded it, to the extent that by 1950 the place was no longer recorded.

== See also ==
- List of areas in Kingston upon Hull
