= 1861 Tooley Street fire =

1861 fire in London

Coordinates: 51.506°N 0.085°W

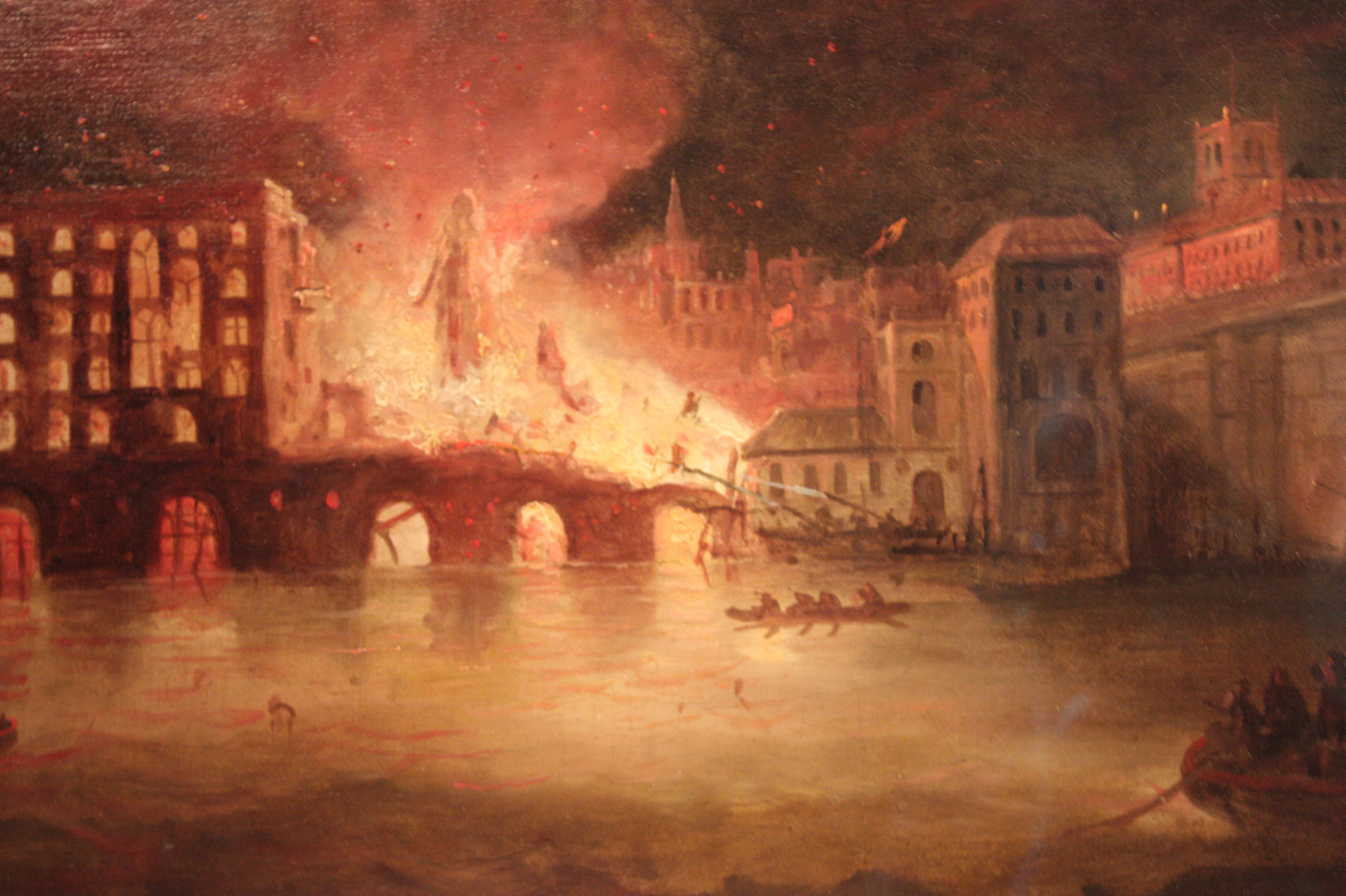
- The Tooley Street fire of 1861
- Date: 22 June 1861
- Duration: Two weeks
- Location: Tooley Street, London
- Also known as: Great Fire of Tooley Street
- Type: Fire
- Cause: Spontaneous combustion
- Deaths: 2+
- Property damage: £2 million

The 1861 Tooley Street fire, also called the Great Fire of Tooley Street, started in Cotton's Wharf on Tooley Street, London, England, on 22 June 1861. The fire lasted for two weeks, and caused £2 million worth of damage. During the fire, James Braidwood, superintendent of the London Fire Engine Establishment, was killed. House of Commons reports cited multiple failures in fire prevention, and the fire led to the 1865 Metropolitan Fire Brigade Act, which established the London Fire Brigade.

== Blaze ==
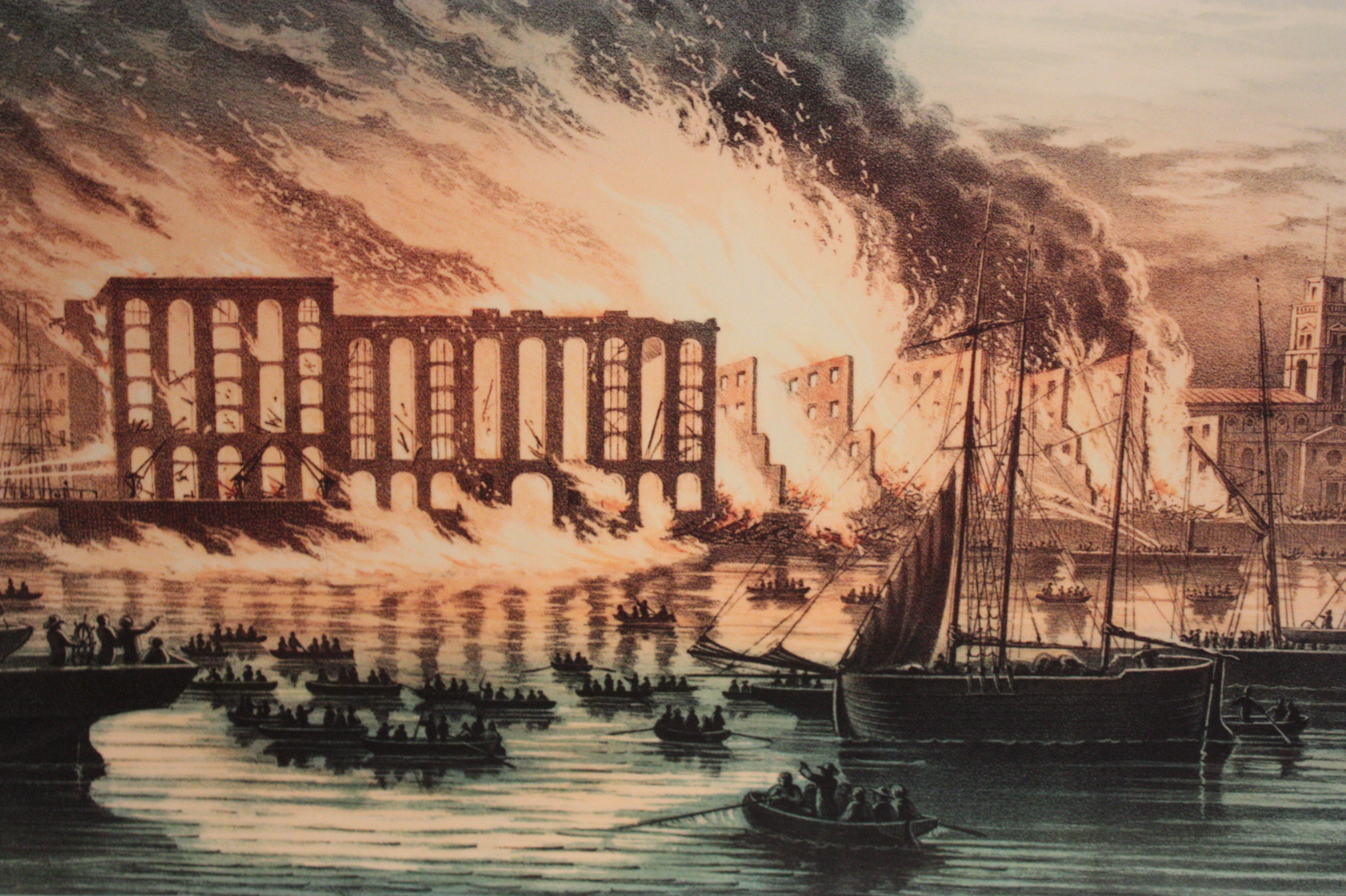
Tooley Street on 23 June 1861

The fire started on 22 June 1861, at Cotton's Wharf on Tooley Street, near to St Olave's Church, Southwark, and was first noticed around 4 p.m. Cotton's Wharf was around 100 by 50 feet (30 m × 15 m), and contained around 5,000 tons of rice, 10,000 barrels of tallow, 1,000 tons of hemp, 1,100 tons of jute, 3,000 tons of sugar and 18,000 bales of cotton at the time of the fire. Unsafe jute and hemp storage in Cotton's Wharf and nearby wharves helped spread the fire. The cause of the fire is believed to have been spontaneous combustion, although it has also been suggested that someone smoking in the wharves may have started the fire. Whilst Cotton's Wharf was classed as good for fire protection, the surrounding buildings were less well protected, which enabled the fire to spread quickly.

The London Fire Engine Establishment (later the London Fire Brigade) were alerted by 5 p.m. A local distiller acted as temporary fire marshal until the London Fire Engine Establishment arrived, as his distillery had two private fire engines. A number of other private fire engines were also used. By 6 p.m., 14 fire engines, including one steam engine, from the London Fire Engine Establishment were at the scene. The Fire Establishment's river fire engine was unable to draw water from the River Thames as it was low tide and so the river was too shallow. The fire was so great that the river fire engine was forced to retreat. The firefighters were also inhibited when the spice warehouses caught fire, which distributed spices into the air. The Royal Society for the Protection of Life from Fire (which was later merged into the London Fire Brigade) also assisted with controlling the fire.

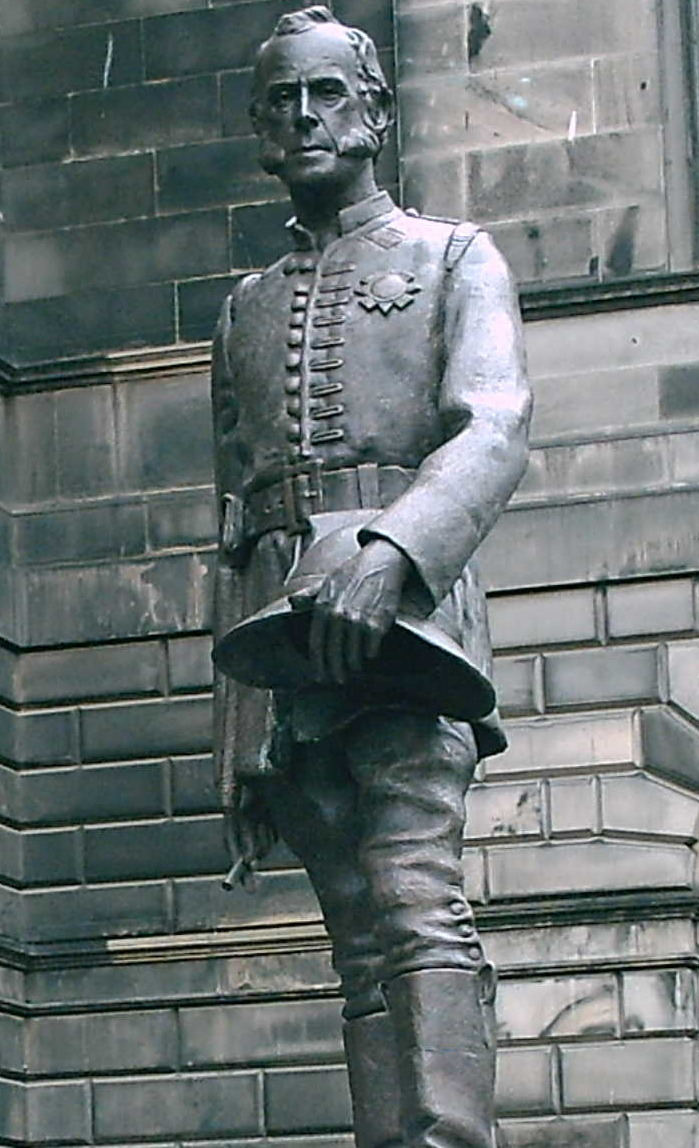
Statue of James Braidwood, who died during the fire.

Around 7 30 p.m., a section of a warehouse collapsed on top of James Braidwood, the superintendent of the London Fire Engine Establishment, killing him. Another firefighter was killed in the same incident. Braidwood had been giving his firefighters their brandy rations at the time of the collapse.

Around 10 hours after the fire started, it was stabilised and confined to a single area. The fire took two weeks to put out, during which time around 20 police officers remained present at the scene. Over 30,000 people watched the fire burn. The fire caused damage to buildings up to 0.25 miles (0.40 km) away from Cotton's Wharf, and destroyed 11 acres (45,000 m^{2}) of land. The range of the fire spanned from St Olave's Church to Battle Bridge Stairs. During the fire, tallow and oil from the wharves spilled into the River Thames, destroying four sailing boats and numerous barges. London Bridge station also caught fire in the blaze, but the fire was put out by the station's private fire engines. The fire could be seen from up to 15 miles (24 km) away. In total, the damages from the fire were around £2 million. In his diary, Arthur Munby described the scene as:

"For near a quarter of a mile, the south bank of the Thames was on fire: a long line of what had been warehouses, their roofs and fronts all gone; and the tall ghastly sidewalls, white with heat, standing, or rather tottering, side by side in the midst of a mountainous desert of red & black ruin, which smouldered & steamed here, & there, sent up sheets of savage intolerable flame a hundred feet high."

At the time, the fire was described as the worst London fire since the Great Fire of London.

== Aftermath ==
An 1862 House of Commons report into the fire noted the lack of availability of water when the fire started, as the area did not have a hydraulic pump as other areas such as West India Dock did, and the water company only supplied water to houses in Tooley Street for 90 minutes a day. An 1867 House of Commons report also criticised the ineffectiveness of the allegedly fire proof floors, and general fire protection in the South London District. It recommended that oil should not be stored in places where it could flow.

According to the 1862 House of Commons report, insurance companies lost over £1 million from the fire. It is believed that one of the owners of Cotton's Wharf was insured for £400,000, and the Royal Insurance Company lost £75,000. It was the first time that most insurance companies had lost money since they had started having private fire engines. Following the fire, insurance companies changed the way they insured wharves, and their fire insurance policies, to encourage safer storage of goods. They also raised their insurance premiums by between 50 and 100%. The fire and insurance premium rises led to the Metropolitan Fire Brigade Act 1865, which established the London Fire Brigade. The act also mandated that iron doors be used as these were less flammable, and recommended that they be shut at all times, which was not the case during the Tooley Street fire. The fire also contributed to the establishment of many new fire insurance firms. These included the Commercial Union and Mercantile companies; and in 1867 the Reinsurance Company in London who specialised in insuring damaged buildings was also established.

The wharves destroyed in the Tooley Street fire were rebuilt as separated buildings, to make them safer from fire in future. A plaque to commemorate the fire, and memorialise James Braidwood, is located on Battle Bridge Lane, on the corner of Tooley Street.

== Other fires on Tooley Street ==
An 1836 fire destroyed Topping's Wharf on Tooley Street, and an 1843 fire on Tooley Street destroyed St. Olave's Church. In 1891, there was another large fire which took 19 days to extinguish, and was described as the worst fire since the 1861 Tooley Street fire.
