= Bertram Allen =

Bertram Allen may refer to:

- Bertram Allen (admiral) (1875–1957), British Royal Navy officer
- Bertram Allen (equestrian) (born 1995), Irish showjumper
