= The London Bridge Experience =

Tourist attraction in London, England

Coordinates: 51.5065°N 0.0881°W

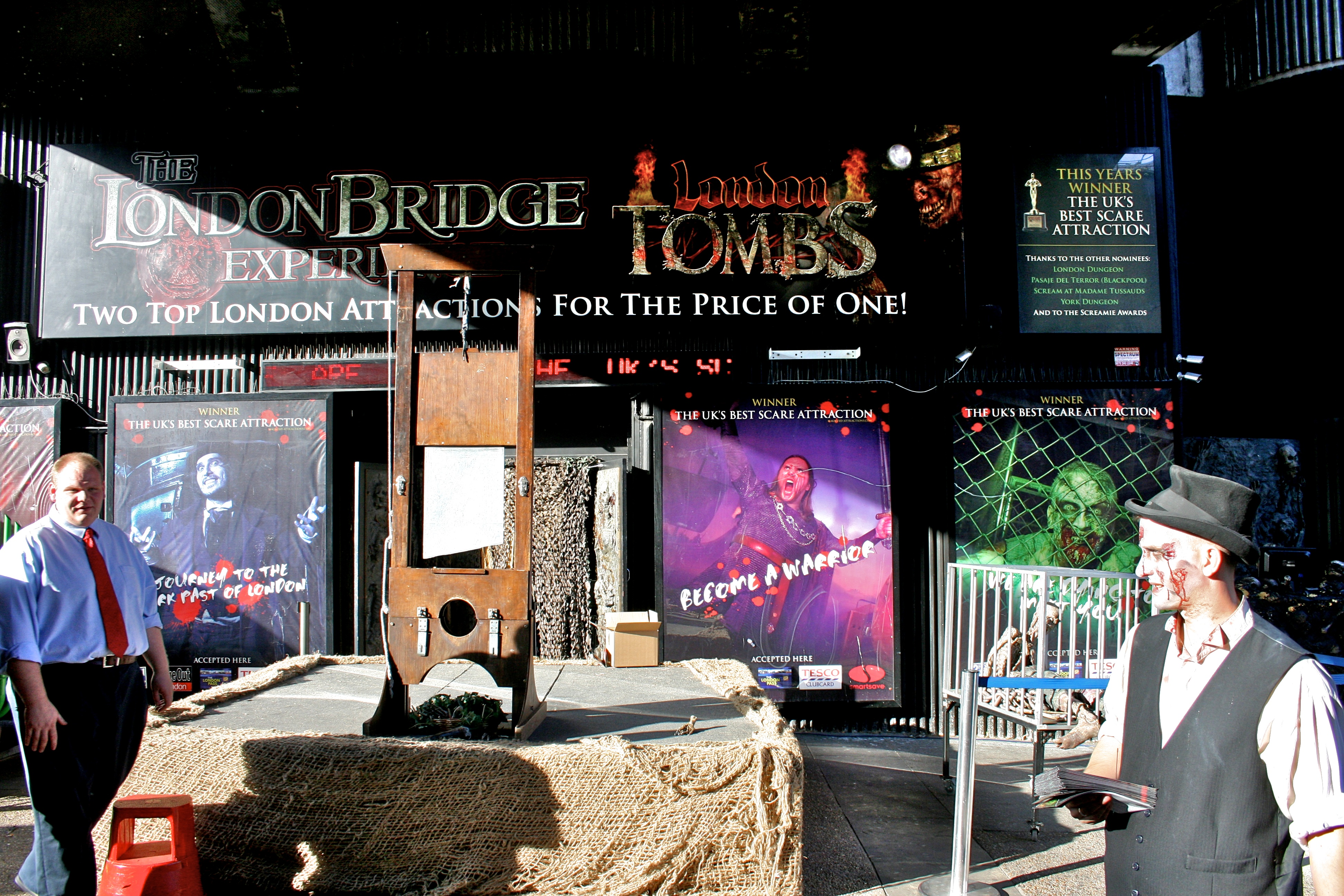
The London Bridge Experience / London Tombs.

The London Bridge Experience was a tourist attraction in Southwark, London, England, on the south bank of the River Thames. Guests were led by actors on a tour through moments in London's history, including Boudicca's battles with the Romans, and The Great Fire of London.

== Overview ==
The attraction was located on Tooley Street, in vaults below the southern abutment of London Bridge, immediately outside London Bridge Station and originally a rival attraction, the London Dungeon, which has since moved closer to the London Eye. It was also opposite The Shard. The attraction opened on 22 February 2008 and cost about £2,000,000 to develop.

On 31 October 2007, before it opened, the BBC reported that a collection of skeletons unearthed in the crypt had scared builders so much that they refused to work alone.

Guests were led by Tour guides on a tour through the 'dark' moments of London's history, which included Boudicca's battles with the Romans, The Great Fire of London and a medieval encounter with Vikings. It explained the history of all the bridges that have been on the site: the first military style pontoon bridge built by the Romans, the first stone bridge built by Peter of Colechurch, the John Rennie Victorian bridge (which has now been relocated to Lake Havasu in Arizona, United States), ending with the current modern bridge opened by Queen Elizabeth II in 1971.

In 2012, The London Bridge Experience introduced an "audio-wand" feature, so foreign customers are able to listen to the show in their own language. This includes German, Spanish, Italian, Polish, and French.

== The London Bridge Experience ==
The London Bridge Experience is the first part of the attractions offering guests the opportunity of journeying through the dark history of London Bridge meeting a variety of characters and journeying from the Roman period through to modern days. The attraction's stories cover figures like Jack the Ripper, William Wallace, Guy Fawkes, and Sir John Rennie. After being unable to afford necessary repairs to bring the attraction up to proper health and safety standards, the London Bridge Experience closed in 2025.

== The London Tombs ==
There is a sister attraction, The London Tombs which is included in the admission price. This is a scare attraction built in the remains of a former plague pit. This part of the attraction is optional and unsuitable for children under 11 years old. Younger visitors can request a child-friendly "Guardian Angel tour".

== Phobophobia ==
The London Bridge Experience is also home to Phobophobia, a Halloween show, that runs throughout October every year. There are two parts of the Phobophobia show, a daytime family friendly halloween show and an evening adult only show which really pulls out all the stops. The evening show has a unique and different theme and has included in the past, Hillbillies, Clowns, Freaks, Living dolls, Ventriloquist dolls, voodoo characters, snakes, spiders and many other characters and themes.

== Awards ==
The London Tombs have won the Screamie Award later to become the SCARS for being the United Kingdom's Best Year Round Scare Attraction for the years 2009–2019, despite limited competition. The London Bridge Experience has been nominated by Group Travel Organiser as a finalist for "Best Attraction for Group Visits". Other finalists included: Buckingham Palace, the London Eye, St Paul's Cathedral, and the Houses of Parliament.
