= The Three Tailors =

The Three Tailors of Tooley Street were, according to Prime Minister George Canning, individuals who presented a petition of grievances to Parliament claiming to represent "We, the people of England."

In his 1906 pamphlet "Faults of the Fabian", H. G. Wells called the Fabian Society policy on the Boer War "the three tailors of Tooley Street pronouncements", suggesting that the Fabians claimed to speak for all socialists when in fact they spoke only for themselves.
