= Devon Mansions =

Residential buildings in Bermondsey, London

Coordinates: 51.50098°N 0.07546°W

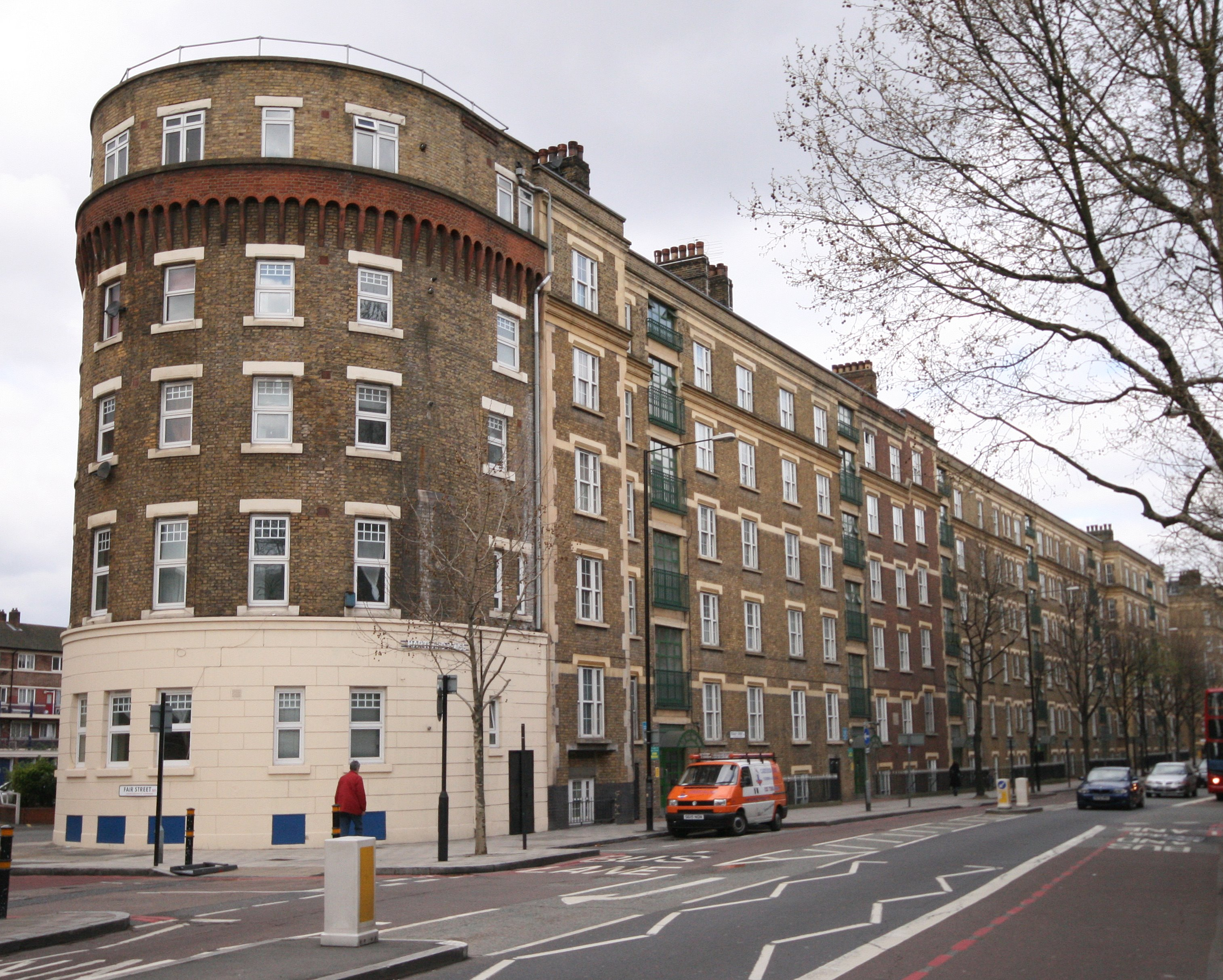
- Building 3 Devon Mansions, looking west down Tooley Street
- Interactive map of Devon Mansions

Other information
- Governing body: London Borough of Southwark

Devon Mansions is a set of five residential mansion block buildings situated along the south side of Tooley Street in Bermondsey, London. The buildings are located within the London Borough of Southwark and are included in both the Tower Bridge and Tooley Street Conservation Areas.

== History ==
During the Victorian era, the area between Tooley Street and the River Thames to the east of what is now Tower Bridge was one of the largest warehouse complexes in London. Completed in 1873, these warehouses housed huge quantities of tea, coffee, spices and other commodities, and became known as London's Larder, due to the vast array of goods and provisions from across the globe.

Despite the commercial success of the warehouse businesses, there were serious problems of poverty, overcrowding and poor sanitation amongst those living in the local area. In 1875, a number of model dwelling tenement blocks were built in the area adjacent to the docks to help house local residents and address some of these social problems. Originally called the Hanover Buildings, these buildings were renamed Devon Buildings around WW1 to remove the German influence from the name. They were later renamed Devon Mansions. The block was built by James Hartnoll.

Devon Mansions was an early example of social housing and, as such, its initial tenants were predominantly working class residents from the local part of Bermondsey, then known as Horsleydown.

The buildings were a private rented complex until acquired by London borough of Southwark in 1965.

However, like many social housing initiatives close to Central London, the composition of tenants in Devon Mansions changed significantly during the 1980s following the launch of the Right to Buy Scheme under the Thatcher Government. As a result, a significant proportion of current occupants of Devon Mansions are now private owners.

== Architectural style ==
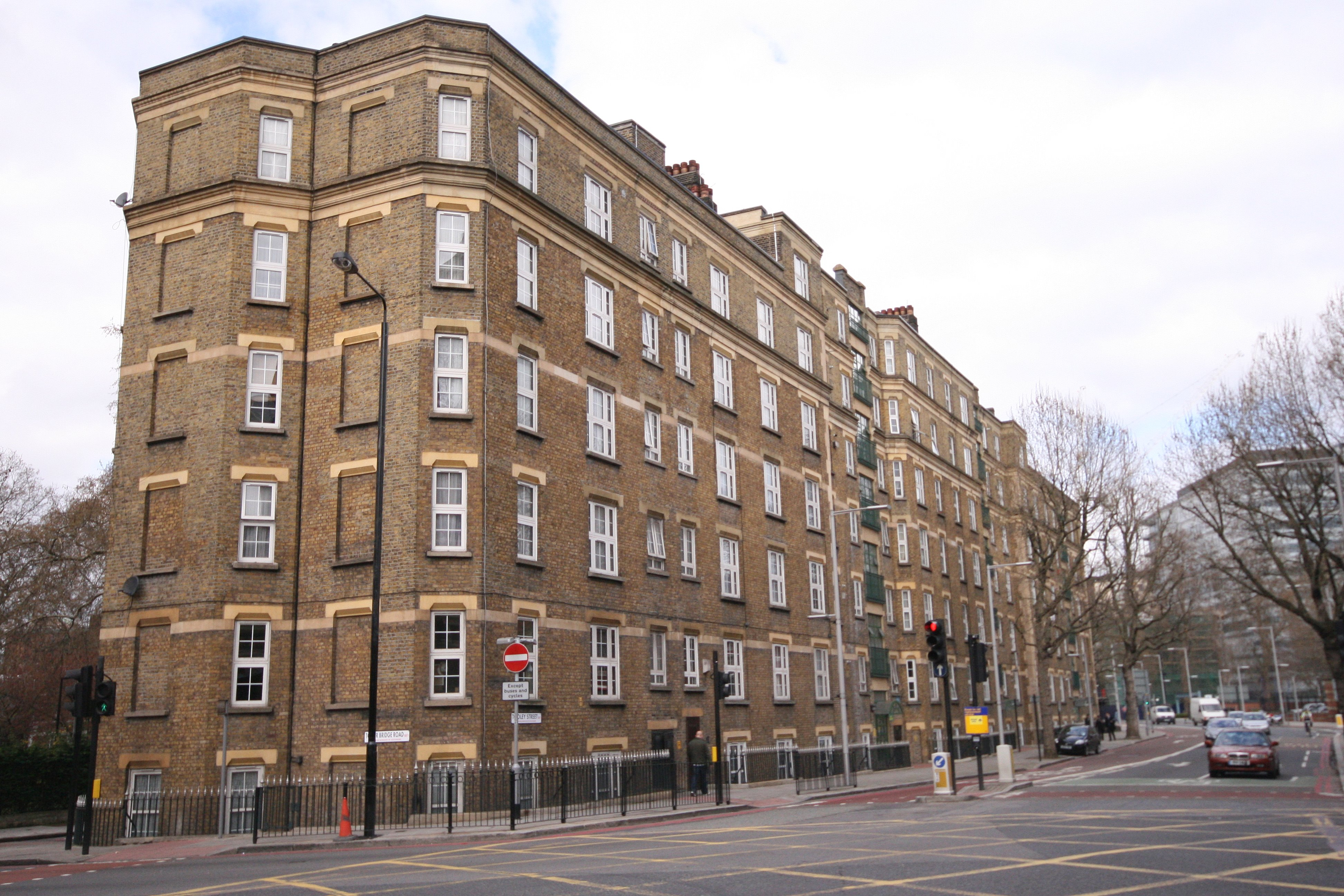
Building 2, Devon Mansions

Devon Mansions comprises five separate, six-storey mansion buildings, all built in a near identical style, each containing several separate but interconnected blocks. Blocks 14-21 have pitched roofs, whereas blocks 1-13 have flat roofs.

The buildings are of yellow brick, with a repetitive pattern of domestic scale sash windows organised within a simple arrangement of string courses and cornices, providing balancing vertical elements with splayed windows and stone quoins. Interest at street level comes from street railings that protect half basements and the main entrances to the buildings.

There were originally 549 flats within Devon Mansions when constructed. The block containing original flats 168-191 was demolished in approximately 1902 to make way for Tower Bridge Road, bringing this number to 525. Following installation of integral bathrooms, lifts and internal reconfiguration of the flats undertaken during modernisation works carried out between 1965 and 1980, there are today approximately 337 flats in all. The current numbering is flats 1 to 180, then jumping to flats 331–489.

The Devon Mansion buildings are a good example of the mansion block style of the era. During its Conservation Area Appraisal, Southwark Council specifically identified Buildings 1 and 2 of Devon Mansions as "making a positive contribution" to the local area - one grade below listed status.

== Location ==
The Devon Mansions buildings are located on five separate sites spanning a distance of approximately 600 m along the south side of Tooley Street. Details of the five buildings are as follows:

- Building 1 (blocks 1–3) is located between Barnham Street and Druid Street, opposite Potters Fields Park and the More London complex.
- Building 2 (blocks 4–7) is located between Fair Street and Tower Bridge Road, opposite the former St Olave's Grammar School and statues commemorating Ernest Bevin, British Labour leader, and Samuel Bourne Bevington, the first mayor of Bermondsey.
- Building 3 (blocks 8–13) is located between Tower Bridge Road and Fair Street, opposite Shad Thames. Block 8, with its decorative fire escape, bears the marks of demolition — an adjoining block was demolished to make way for the new Tower Bridge Road in 1902. Block 13, although part of Building 3, is known as Hartland House. Hartland House was originally a public/beer house of some description although there are no remnants of its earlier life, other than a picture in the local studies library which is testament to this fact. It is likely that the pub was converted into flats quite soon after the buildings were built as the Ordnance Survey only ever recorded it as a PH (public house) on one edition. It was known as the City of Salisbury Public House, 198 Tooley Street.
- Building 4 (blocks 14–19) is located between Fair Street and Tanner Street, opposite Shad Thames.
- Building 5 (blocks 20–21) is located between Tanner Street and Sweeney Crescent, opposite the southern end of St Saviour's Dock.

The nearest stations are Tower Hill (District and Circle lines), London Bridge (Jubilee, Northern and national rail), and Bermondsey (Jubilee line) each about 10–15 minutes' walk away. The walk towards London Bridge or Tower Hill is extremely scenic, particularly at night, with views of many landmarks such as City Hall, the Tower of London and Tower Bridge. Devon Mansions are also served by London bus routes 188, 47, N47, 381, N381, 343 and RV1.

== Damage during the Blitz ==
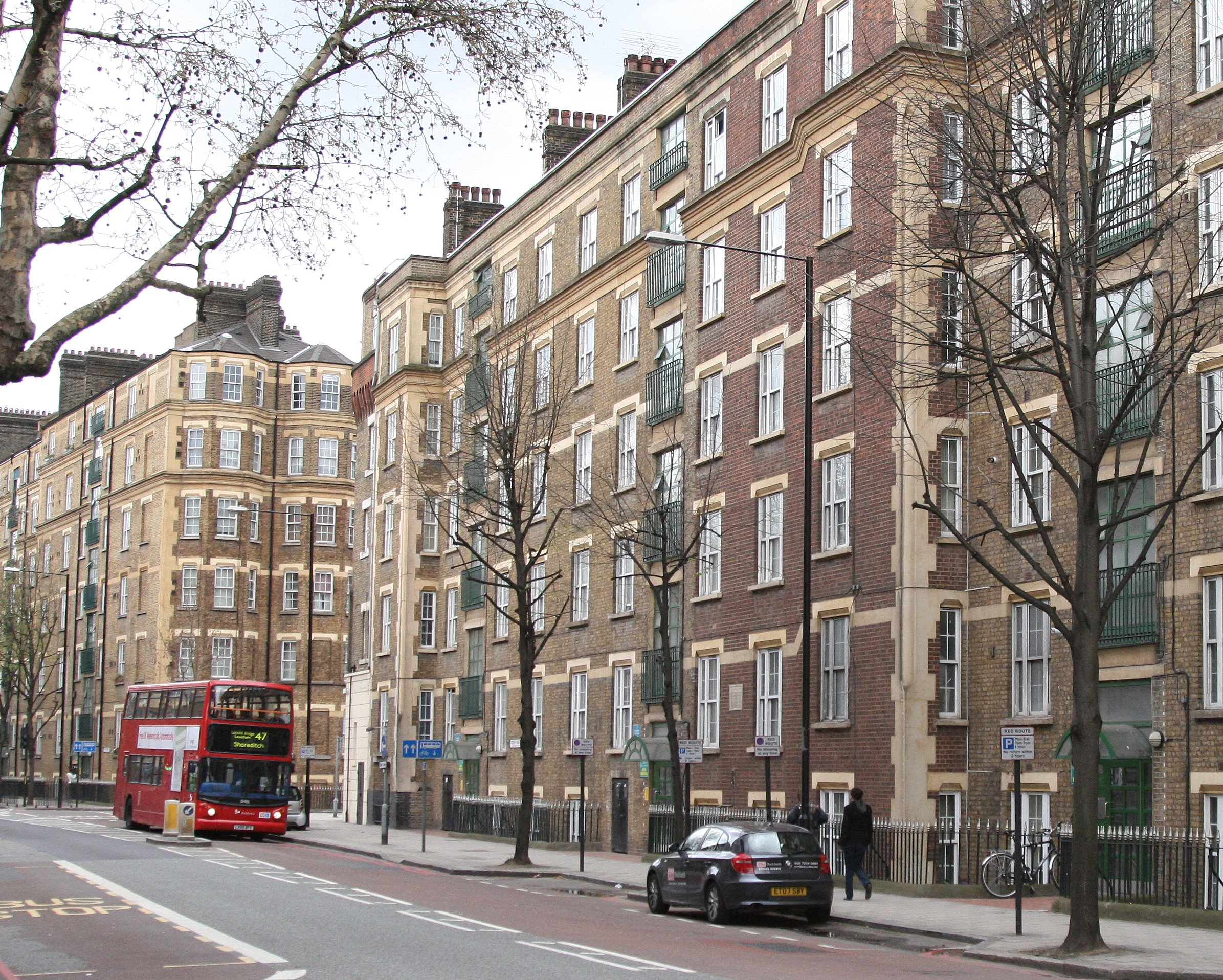
Building 3, the site of the World War II bomb blast

The area along the south bank of the Thames was heavily targeted by the Luftwaffe during World War II, due to presence of strategically important transport and storage infrastructure. As a result, buildings on Tooley Street were often at threat of destruction from German bombs during the Blitz.

On 29 December 1940, in one of the most devastating bombing raids of the Blitz, German planes attacked the City of London with incendiaries and high-explosive bombs, causing what has been called the Second Great Fire of London.

During this raid, a high explosive bomb landed on Building 3 of Devon Mansions, destroying a 20-metre section of the building between Blocks 12 and 13. According to the Civilian War Dead Register of the Commonwealth War Graves Commission, three residents were killed by the blast.

The damaged section was repaired in full in 1950, but it is still possible to see the site of the bomb impact, as the brick used to repair the building is of slightly darker colour than its surroundings. A plaque commemorating the event is visible at street level.

== Devon Mansions today ==
During the 20th century, the docks that had brought so much prosperity to the area went into decline. When the London Borough of Southwark acquired Devon Mansions in 1965, it originally considered demolishing the mansion blocks due to the squalid nature of them (most of the flats did not have any bathrooms, none of the blocks had lifts and the toilet was in with the kitchen). However, this was dismissed because of the extremely narrow site on which the blocks were built and also because of the large number of tenants occupying the blocks. A plan was therefore devised for the blocks to be modernised in stages so as to minimise disruption to the residents. Work started in 1967 and finally concluded in 1980, taking some 13 years to conclude. This is why the numbers jump from 108 to 331 (although some of these numbers are because a block was demolished to make way for Tower Bridge after 1894 but no later than 1902.

During the 1980s and 1990s, many of the disused but picturesque warehouses along the River Thames were converted into expensive flats, highly sought after by those wanting to live close to the City of London. This became known as Shad Thames. Although apartments in Devon Mansions have not seen the same level of property price inflation as those in neighbouring Shad Thames, they have benefited from gentrification of the local area. An increasing number of the properties are privately owned, though a large proportion remain council properties occupied by council tenants. Lately, Devon Mansions has attracted a number of young professionals from the creative industries such as contemporary artists Marjolein Verheij and Dominik Platen. There is currently a healthy demand for rental properties driven by city workers attracted by the proximity to the city, and selection of top restaurants, cafes and bars in Shad Thames, London Bridge and Borough High Street.

The freehold to Devon Mansions is owned by Southwark Council and the property was managed by the Fair Community Housing Services tenant management organisation (TMO) until 1 November 2024. Fair Community Housing Services is no longer managing properties on behalf of Southwark Council. On 1 November 2024 the Council took over all day to day services.
