= James Braidwood =

Scottish firefighter (1800–1861)

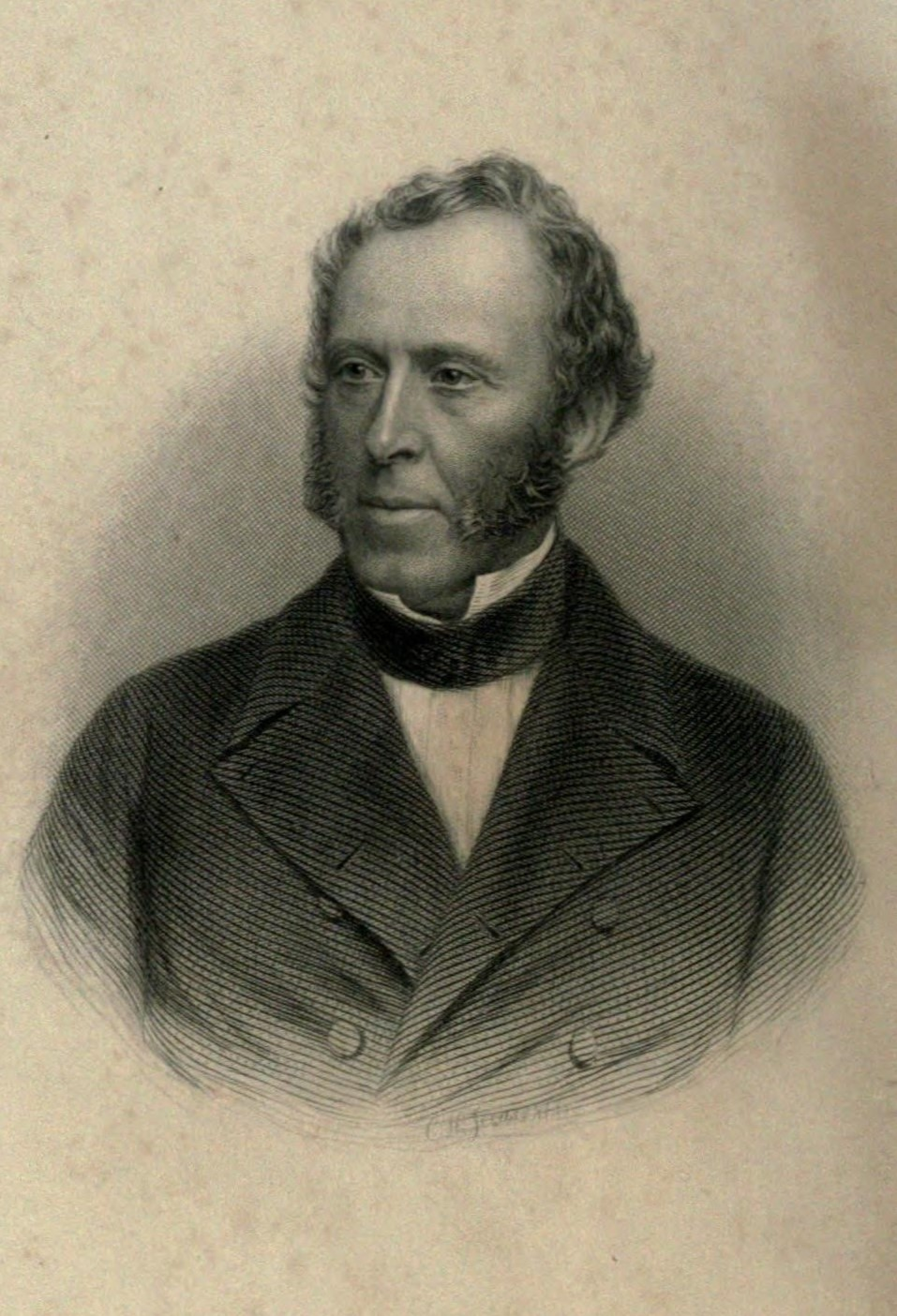
Engraving of James Braidwood

James Braidwood (1800–1861) was a Scottish firefighter who was the first Master of Engines in the world's first municipal fire service in Edinburgh in 1824. He was also the first director of the London Fire Engine Establishment and is credited with the development of the modern municipal fire service.

== Early life ==
He was born in Edinburgh, the tenth child of Janet Mitchell and Francis James Braidwood, a cabinetmaker. The family lived in College Street next to the University of Edinburgh. By 1810 the family owned an upholstery firm, Braidwood and Son, in Adam Square and were living in Roxburgh Square. James was educated at the High School in Edinburgh, east of his home.

== Career ==
He was the first director of the London Fire Engine Establishment (the brigade which was eventually to become the London Fire Brigade). He is credited with the development of the modern municipal fire service.

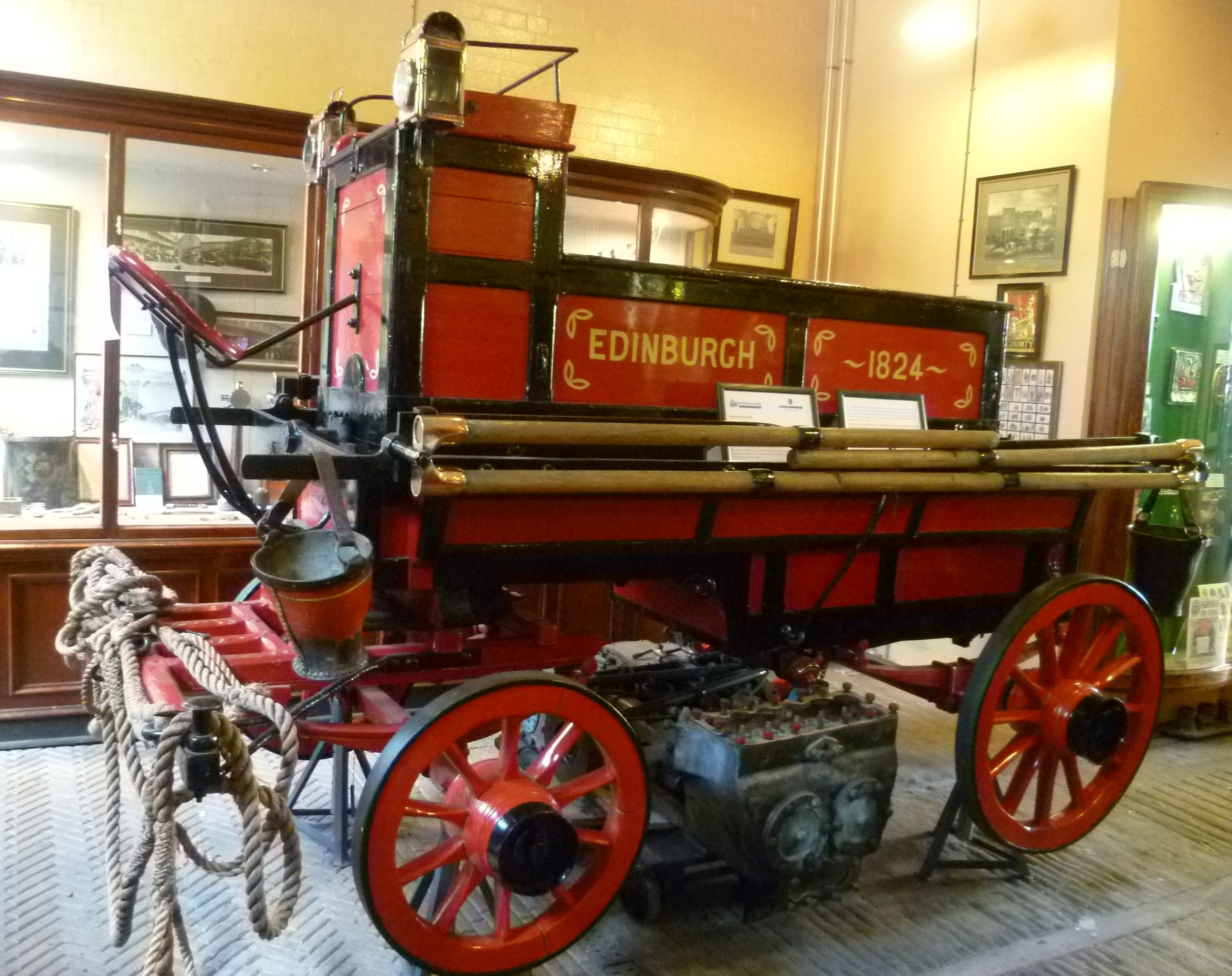
One of Edinburgh's first fire engines from 1824

Appointed Master of Fire Engines at the age of 24, two months prior to the Great Fire of Edinburgh, Braidwood established principles of fire-fighting that are still applied today. His training as a surveyor gave him exceptional knowledge of the behaviour of building materials and housing conditions in the Old Town of Edinburgh. He recruited to the service expert tradesmen – slaters, carpenters, masons and plumbers – who could apply their various fields of expertise to fire fighting. He also recruited experienced mariners for an occupation that required heavy manual work in hauling engines and trundling wheeled escape ladders up and down Edinburgh's steep streets, as well as nimble footwork when negotiating rooftops and moving through partially destroyed buildings. His many original ideas of practical organisation and methodology, published in 1830, were adopted throughout Britain. He was, however, resistant to the introduction of steam-driven engines. In 1833 he left Edinburgh to lead the London Fire Engine Establishment. The London Fire Engine Establishment had to fight a blaze at the Palace of Westminster, on 16 October 1834, that destroyed almost all of the Palace.

Braidwood was distinguished for his heroism on the occasion of great fires in Edinburgh (1824) and London (1830). He also undertook a pastoral role, introducing visits to firemen and their families by the London City Mission.

Braidwood was the first witness at the trial of William Burke of Burke and Hare fame. He gave evidence on Christmas Eve of 1828, in his capacity as an Edinburgh builder, who had been commissioned by the authorities to draw scale plans of the notorious lodging house on Tanners Close where the murders took place. His evidence was simply to state that the plans were an accurate representation of the building.

== Marriage ==
On 14 November 1838 he married (at St. Mary, Aldermary, London) Mary Ann Jane, daughter of Samuel Sibery and widow of John Jackson. The second daughter of this marriage, Fanny (b.1840) was the mother of Sir Bertram Cowles Allen (1875–1957).

== Death ==
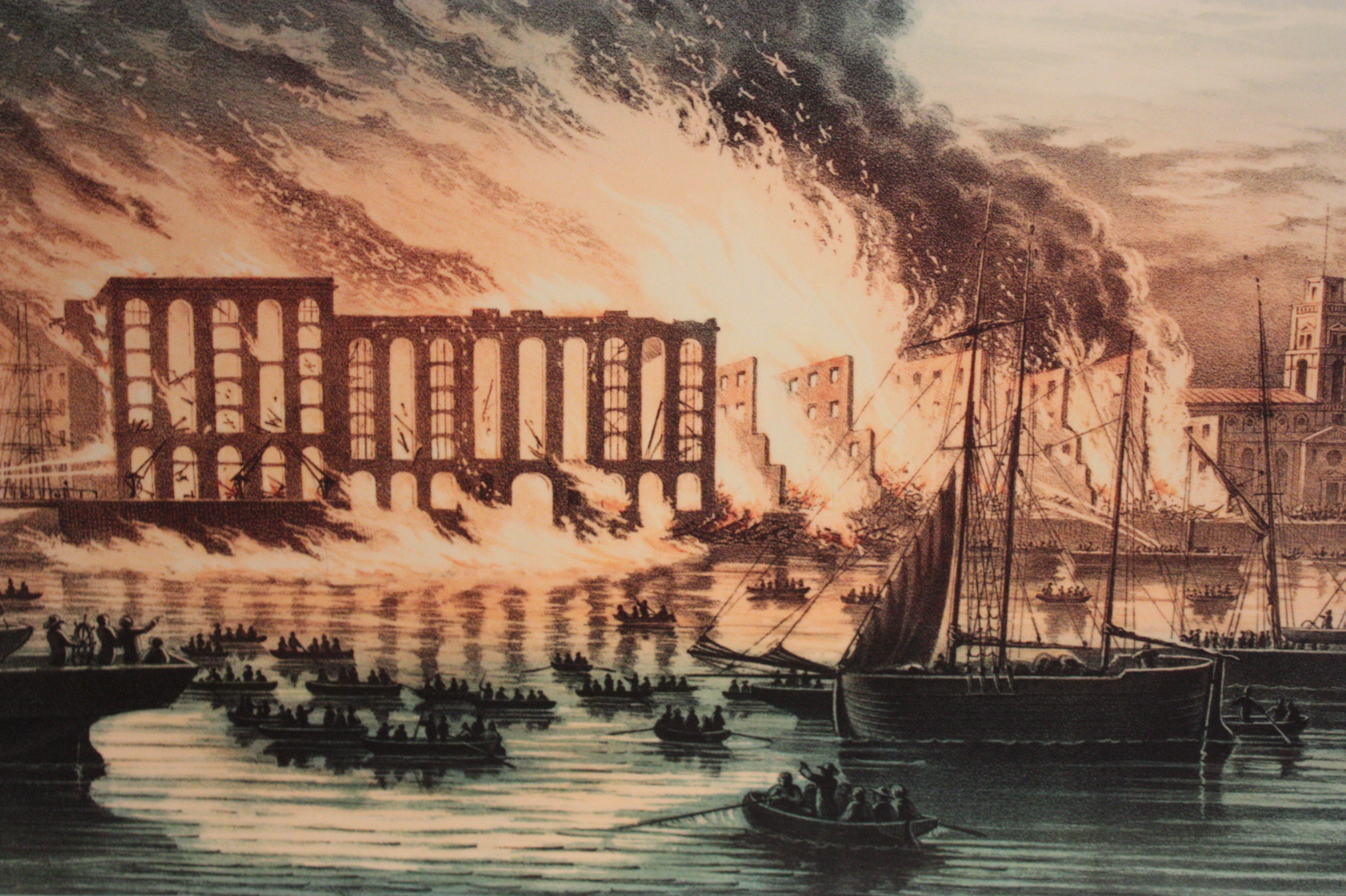
The Tooley Street fire by the end of the second day

On 22 June 1861 Braidwood died in the Tooley Street fire at Cotton's Wharf near London Bridge station when a falling wall crushed him, three hours after the fire began. It took two days to recover his body. His heroism led to a massive funeral on 29 June in which the funeral cortege stretched 1.5 miles (2.4 km) behind the hearse, a public spectacle almost equal to the fire itself. The fire, which continued to burn for a fortnight, caused damage valued at £2,000,000, equivalent to £205,830,000 in 2025 and was considered the worst fire since the Great Fire of London in 1666.

Braidwood is buried at Abney Park Cemetery, Stoke Newington, London, not far from the Stoke Newington Fire Station. The grave lies on a path edge towards the south, rendering it relatively easy to see in this congested and overgrown cemetery. His wife, Mary Ann Jane Braidwood (1806–1871) was buried with him. He was also buried near his stepson, also a fireman, who had died six years earlier.

The grave was long lost to public view but in 1981, following much research by the then Stoke Newington Fire Station White Watch Station Officer, Liam Hackett, the precise location of the grave was found. Hackett then spent the rest of the summer clearing the site and restoring the lettering on the monument.

== Legacy ==
=== National memorial ===
The death of James Braidwood, whilst engaged in fire fighting duties, is recorded on the National Firefighters Memorial which is located adjacent to St Paul's Cathedral in the City of London.

=== Freemason Lodge ===
In 2005, a group of former London firefighters founded a new Masonic lodge. They commemorated Braidwood's life and death by naming the lodge after him. This is now known as the Braidwood Lodge Number 9802 and is based in Dartford, Kent.

=== Fire manual ===
Recognising the lack of publications on fire engines in the English language, Braidwood published what is regarded as one of the first textbooks on the science of fire engineering in 1830: On the Construction of Fire Engines and Apparatus. Braidwood also authored Fire prevention and fire extinction, published posthumously in 1866.

=== Edinburgh memorial ===
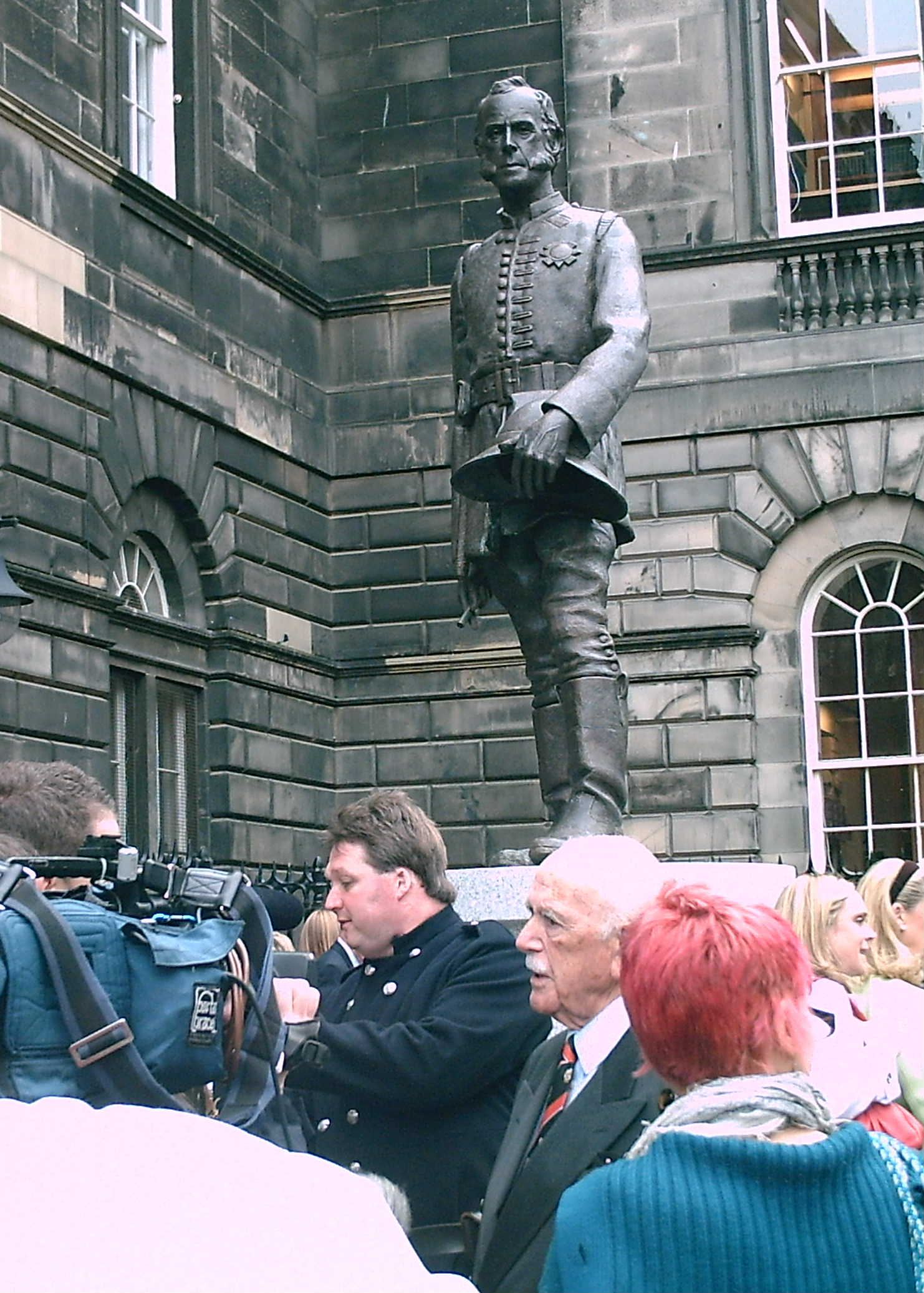
Unveiling of the new statue of James Braidwood in Edinburgh on 5 September 2008. The person in the dark suit and tie was the statue's main sponsor, Dr Frank Rushbrook CBE

On 5 September 2008, the James Braidwood memorial statue in Parliament Square, Edinburgh was unveiled by Professor Sir Timothy O'Shea, Principal of the University of Edinburgh. A fund had been established for a £75,000 memorial to Braidwood, to be created by the Glasgow sculptor, Kenneth Mackay, led by Dr Frank Rushbrook CBE, 93-year-old former Firemaster at Lothian & Borders Fire Brigade. The statue stands around the corner from the site of the original main fire station in the High Street. The bronze plaque below it reads:

James Braidwood

1800–1861
Father of the British Fire Service

This statue is dedicated to the memory of James Braidwood, a pioneer of the scientific approach to fire-fighting. It also recognises the courage and sacrifice of fire-fighters, not only in Lothian & Borders Fire and Rescue Service, but all over the world.

=== Crown Court plaque ===
There is a memorial plaque to James Braidwood in Crown Court Church of Scotland, in Russell Street, Covent Garden, where Braidwood was a Church Elder and Sunday School Superintendent.

=== Other honours ===
In 1830, the Society of Arts (now the Royal Society of Arts) awarded Braidwood a silver medal for his invention of the chain ladder fire escape. In 1844, he was awarded the Telford Medal for his paper, 'On the means of rendering large supplies of Water available in case of Fire'.

In 1937, the Lambeth river fire station in London received a new high-speed fire float, named in Braidwood's honour.

Braidwood Street, a road off Tooley Street in the London Bridge Area, near where he died was also named after him. On the corner of Braidwood Street on a building that is part of the London Bridge Hospital is a memorial to James Braidwood. Braidwood Forest was opened at Ingrebourne Hill, a Forestry England site in Rainham in August 2016.

== Gallery ==
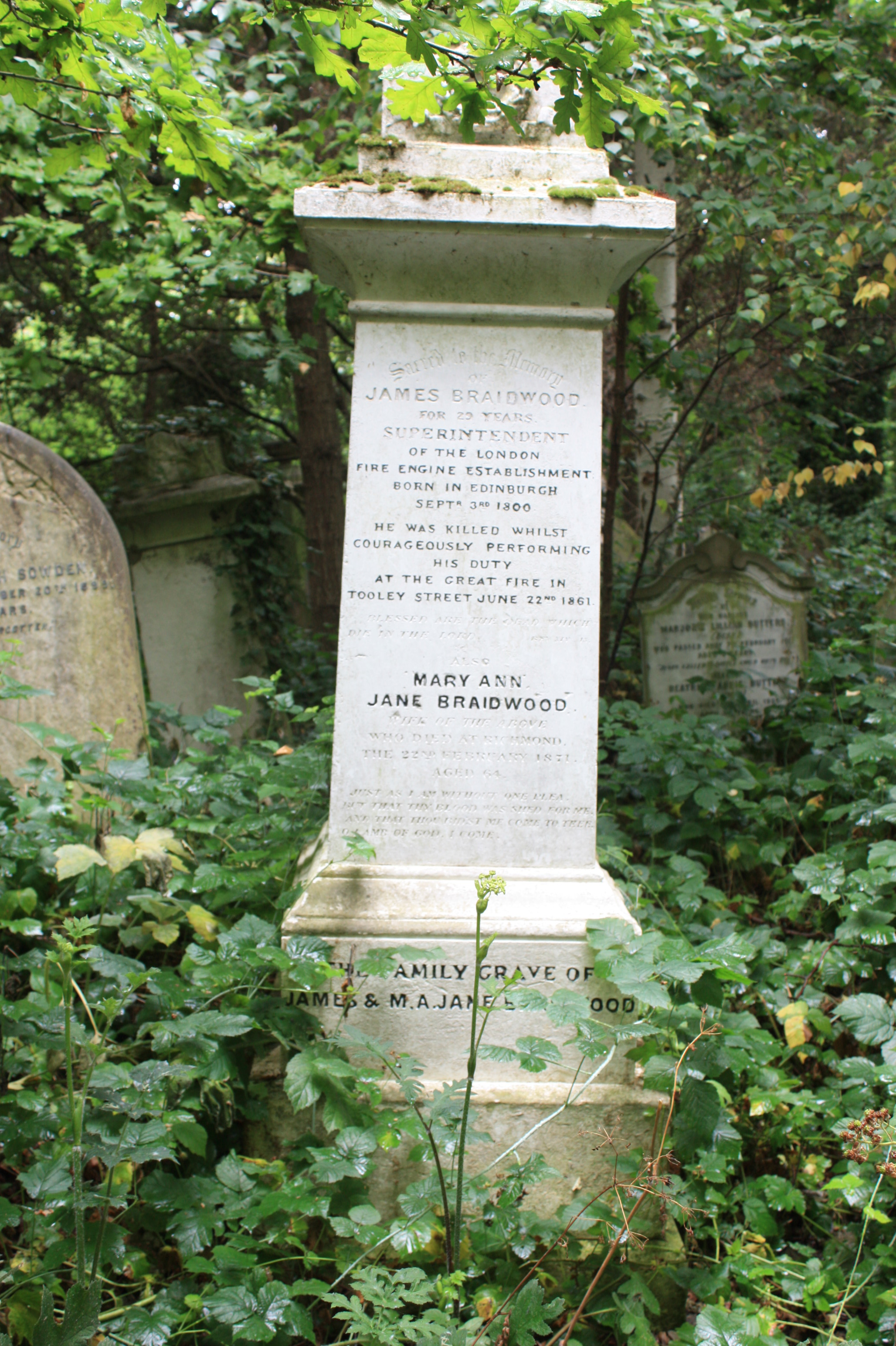
Headstone of James Braidwood at Abney Park Cemetery in 2015

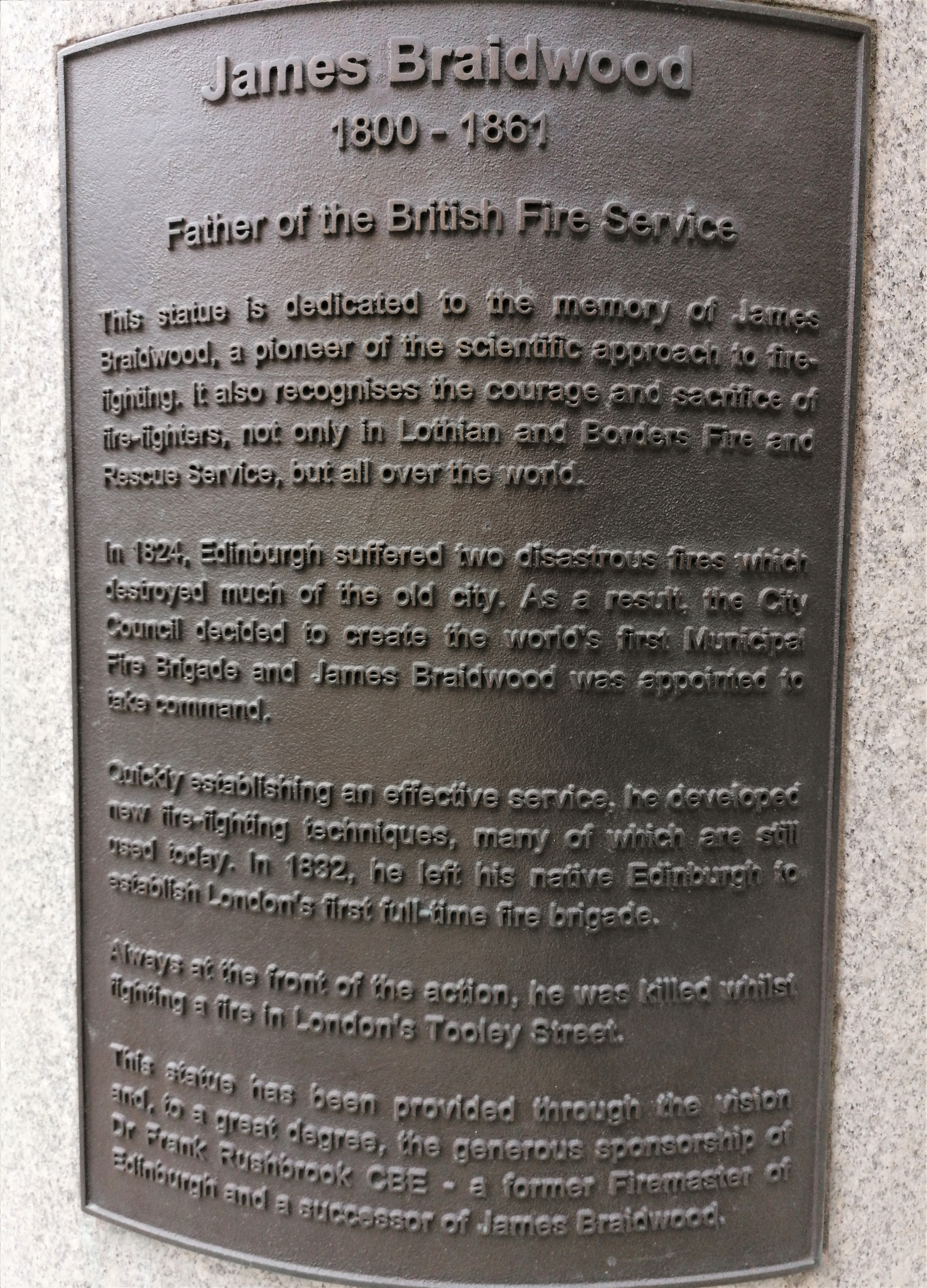
James Braidwood statue full inscription text

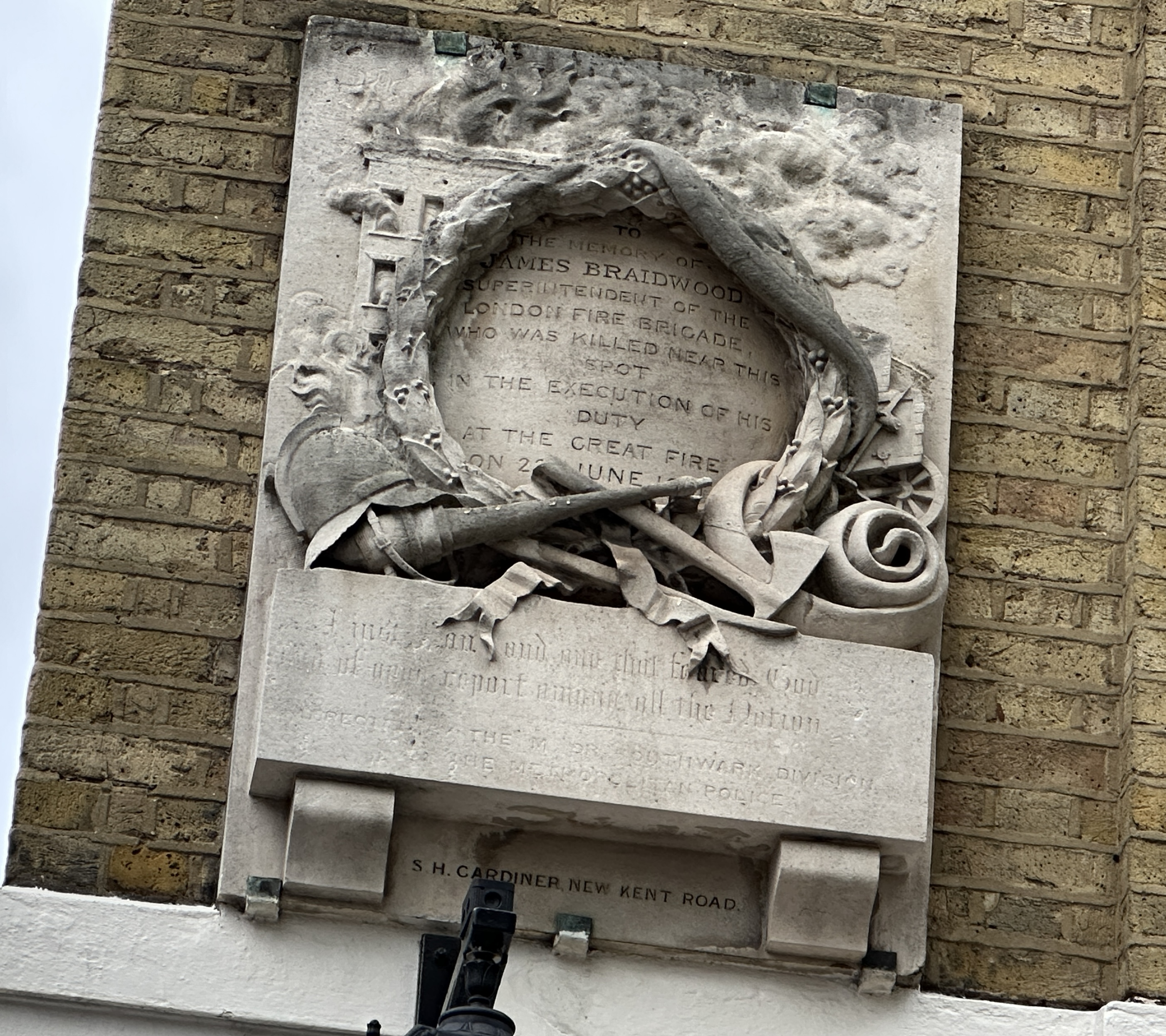
Memorial on Tooley Street, London
