= Bertram Allen (Royal Navy officer) =

British Royal Navy officer (1875–1957)

Paymaster Rear-Admiral Sir Bertram Allen KCB MVO
- Allen in 1930
- Born: Bertram Cowles Allen; 29 November 1875; Hampton Wick, Surrey, England
- Died: 7 February 1957 (aged 81); Seaford, Sussex, England
- Military career
- Allegiance: United Kingdom
- Branch: Royal Navy
- Service years: 1893–1929
- Rank: Paymaster Rear-Admiral
- Conflicts: Second Boer War; First World War
- Awards: Knight Commander of the Order of the Bath; Member of the Royal Victorian Order

Paymaster Rear-Admiral Sir Bertram Cowles Allen KCB MVO (29 November 1875 – 7 February 1957) was a British Royal Navy officer.

Allen was the third son of Royal Navy officer George Henry Allen (13 December 1829 - 17 December 1877) and his wife, Fanny nee Braidwood. Fanny was the second daughter of James Braidwood (1800-1861), Superintendent of the London Fire Brigade. Bertram Cowles Allen was educated at Christ's Hospital and commissioned in the Royal Navy in 1893. He fought in the Naval Brigade during the Second Boer War, and was awarded clasps for Belmont, Modder River, Driefontein and Paardeburg. He was promoted to paymaster in 1900, and served as paymaster on RMS Medina during George V's voyage to the Delhi Durbar in 1911. He was made a Member of the Royal Victorian Order in 1912 in recognition of his services during the voyage. He saw active service in the First World War and was invested as a Companion of the Order of the Bath in 1919.

Allen was promoted to Paymaster Captain in 1921 and served as Secretary to the Fourth Sea Lord, before working as Paymaster Director-General between 1926 and his retirement in 1929. That year he was knighted in the 1929 Birthday Honours as a Knight Commander of the Order of the Bath.

On 18 December 1908, he married Edith Mary Perks (1884-1971), the third daughter of Sir Robert Perks, 1st Baronet. Together they had two daughters: Edith Elizabeth (born 6 October 1909); and Anne Ruth (born 26 December 1912). He died at his home in Seaford, Sussex, on 7 February 1957. He was buried at Seaford parish church on 14 February 1957.
