= Tooley Street =

Road in Central and South London

Coordinates: 51°30′16.76″N 0°5′0.98″W

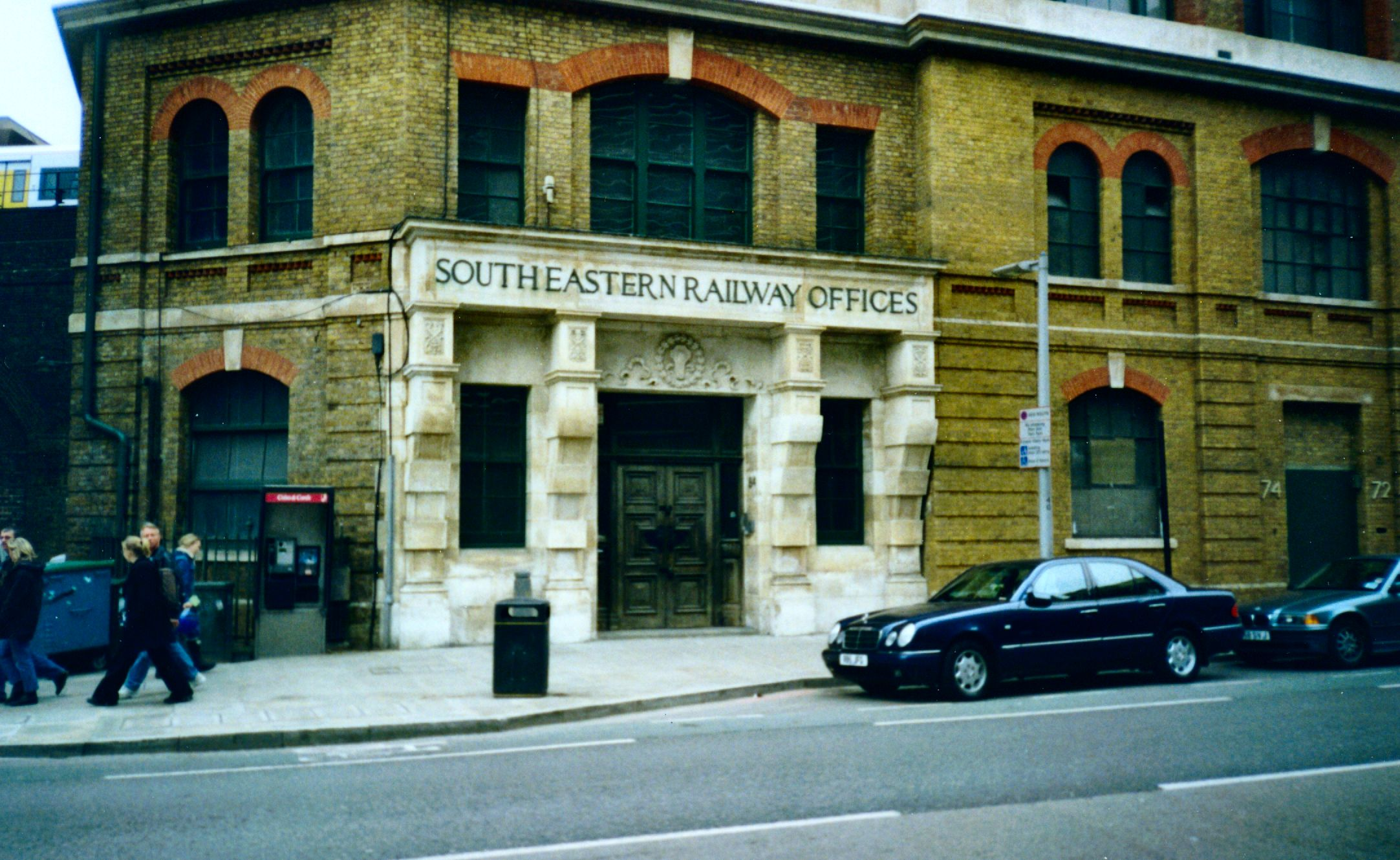
Former South Eastern Railway offices at No. 84

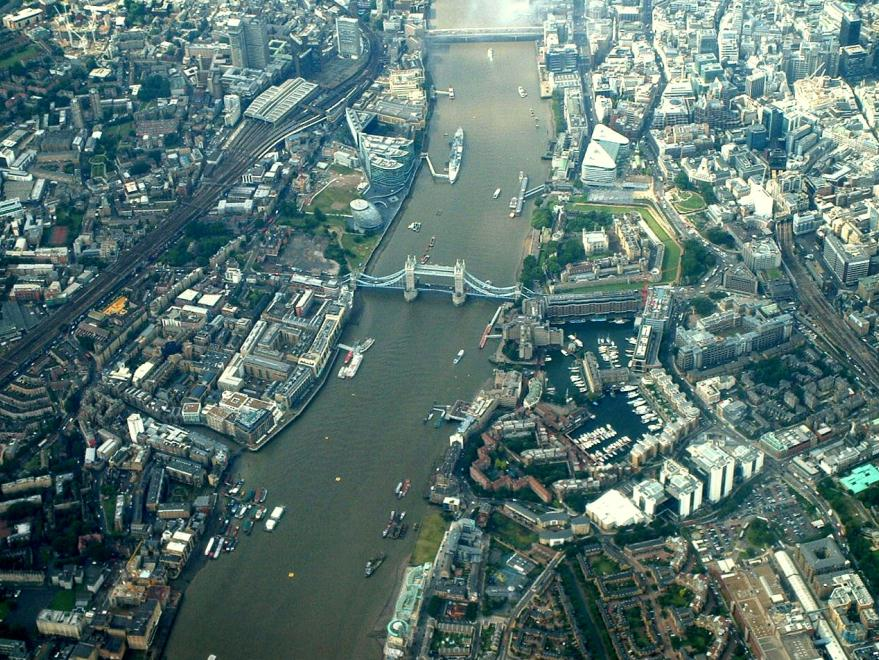
Tooley Street can be seen on the left of this photo, running parallel to the river, between it and the railway line

Tooley Street is a road in central and south London connecting London Bridge to St Saviour's Dock; it runs past Tower Bridge on the Southwark/Bermondsey side of the River Thames, and forms part of the A200 road. (grid reference TQ3380.)

== St Olave ==
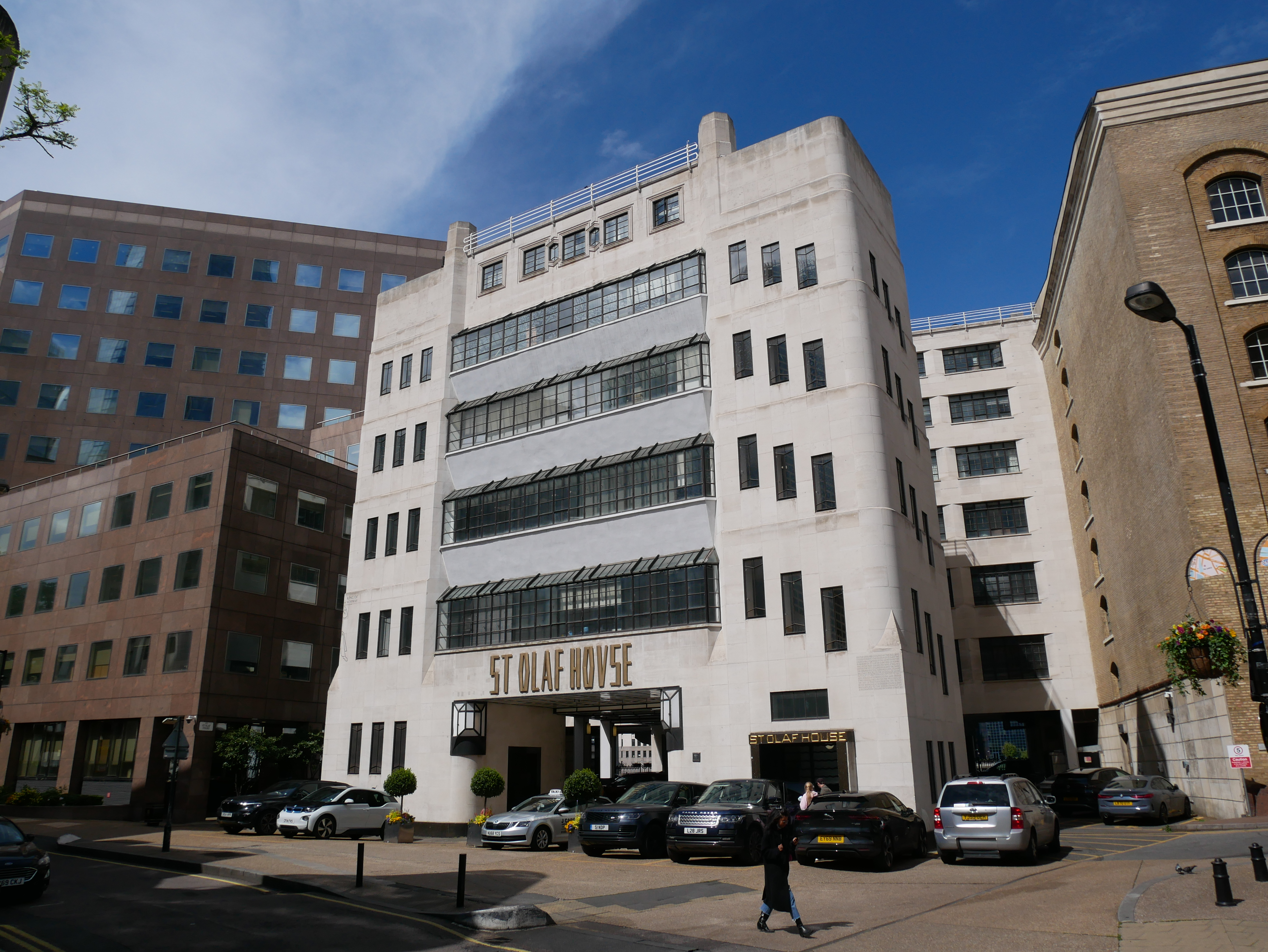
St Olaf House

The earliest name for the street recorded in the Rolls is the neutral regio vicio i.e. "royal street", meaning a public highway. In the "Woodcut" map of c.1561 it is shown as "Barms Street", i.e. street to Bermondsey; in the Stuart period it was referred to as "Short Southwark" to differentiate it from "Long Southwark" (the present Borough High Street).

The later "Tooley" designation is a corruption of the original Church of St Olave and the transformation can be seen on maps of the area from those of Georg Braun and Frans Hogenberg, John Rocque, and later, which name the church "Synt Toulus", "Toulas", "Toolis", "Toolies". The church takes its name from the Norwegian King Olaf who was an ally of Æthelred the Unready and attacked Cnut's forces occupying the London Bridge area in 1013. The earliest reference to the church is in the Southwark entry in Domesday Book of 1086. The church was a little to the east of London Bridge of the period. The church was demolished in 1926 for the headquarters of the Hay's Wharf Company, "St Olaf House", an office block built 1929–31 by Harry Stuart Goodhart-Rendel (1887–1959) in Art Deco style. This has a legend and mural depiction of the Saint.

The termination of the street is not actually at the junction with Borough High Street, as often assumed, for that part of the highway is actually Duke Street Hill. Tooley Street actually joins Montague Close under the arch of London Bridge a little to the north of this.

== Fire ==
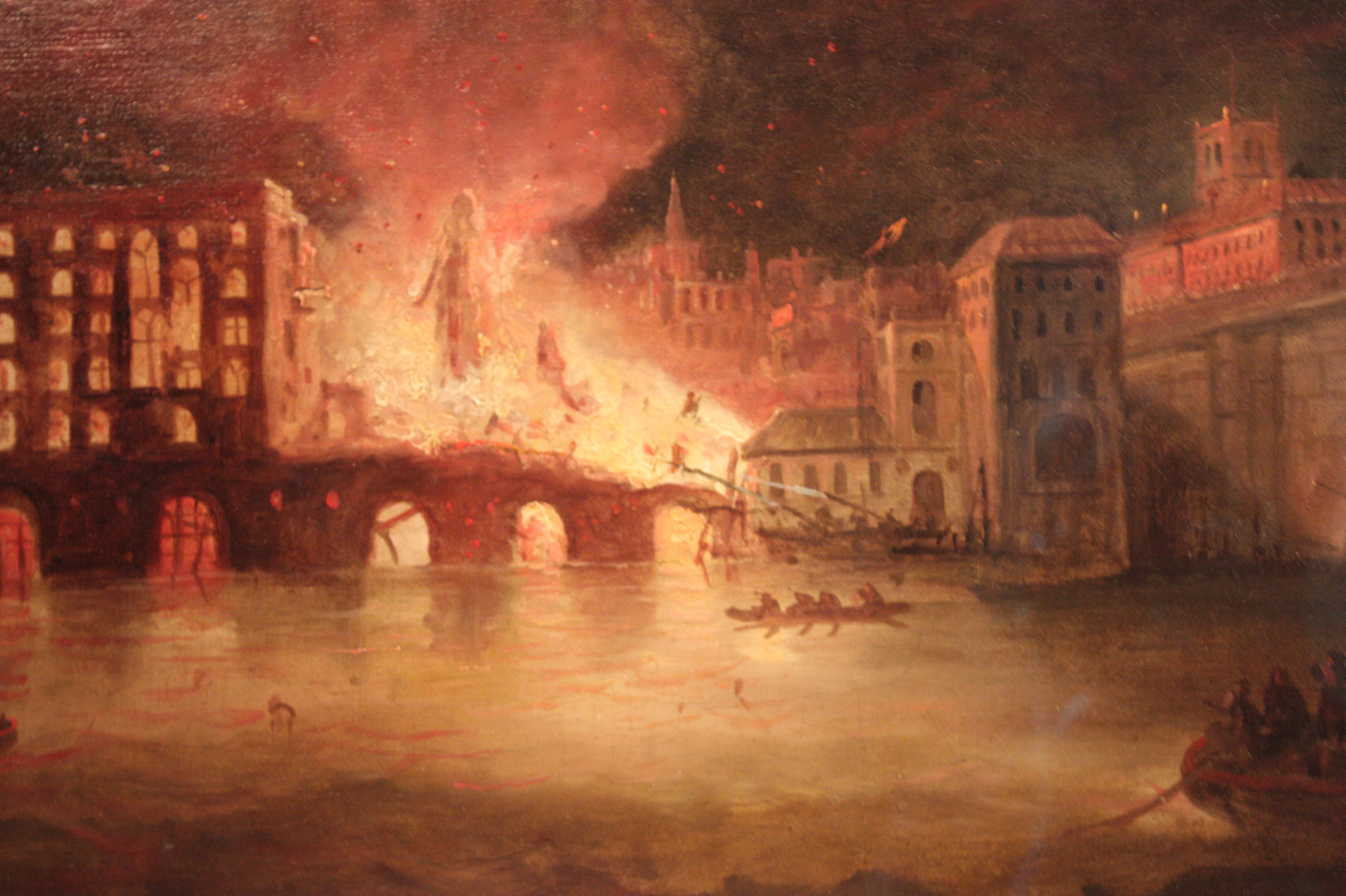
The Tooley Street fire of 1861

This fire happened at a time when the fire 'brigade', formally known as the London Fire Engine Establishment, was still run by insurance companies. It began on 22 June 1861 in a warehouse at Cotton's Wharf in Tooley Street and raged for two days, destroying many nearby buildings. It was two weeks before the fire went out completely. The head of the Establishment, James Braidwood, was killed by a falling wall while fighting the fire. It was one of the largest fires in London during the 19th century.

Afterwards the insurance companies raised their premiums and threatened to disband the brigade until finally the government agreed to take it over. The Metropolitan Fire Brigade Act was passed in 1865 and led to a publicly funded fire service – the first real London fire brigade.

== George Orwell ==
In the early 1930s George Orwell lived as a tramp to gain a first-hand view of poverty. He befriended a man called Ginger in the hop-fields of Kent. They came to a "kip" (doss-house) in Tooley Street and stayed there from 19 September to 8 October 1931. Orwell wrote rough notes in the kip then went further along Tooley Street to Bermondsey Library where he wrote them up into the book Down and Out in Paris and London. The library building was demolished in the 1980s and the site is now part of the open space called Potter's Fields.

== Hay's Wharf ==
The most famous wharf of the south side of the Pool of London was Hay's Wharf, first mentioned in 1651 to the east of St Olave's church. For 300 years it grew, until Tooley Street and the surrounding industrial development was nicknamed "London's Larder". The warehouses burned down in the 1861 fire (see above). Hay's Wharf was where Ernest Shackleton's ship Quest lay in 1921. This dock was filled in during extensive rebuilding in the 1980s and is now a shopping mall called Hay's Galleria. The office block attached to it is called "Shackleton House". Nearby, at No. 27 is the private London Bridge Hospital in the St Olaf House building.

== Old and new horrors ==
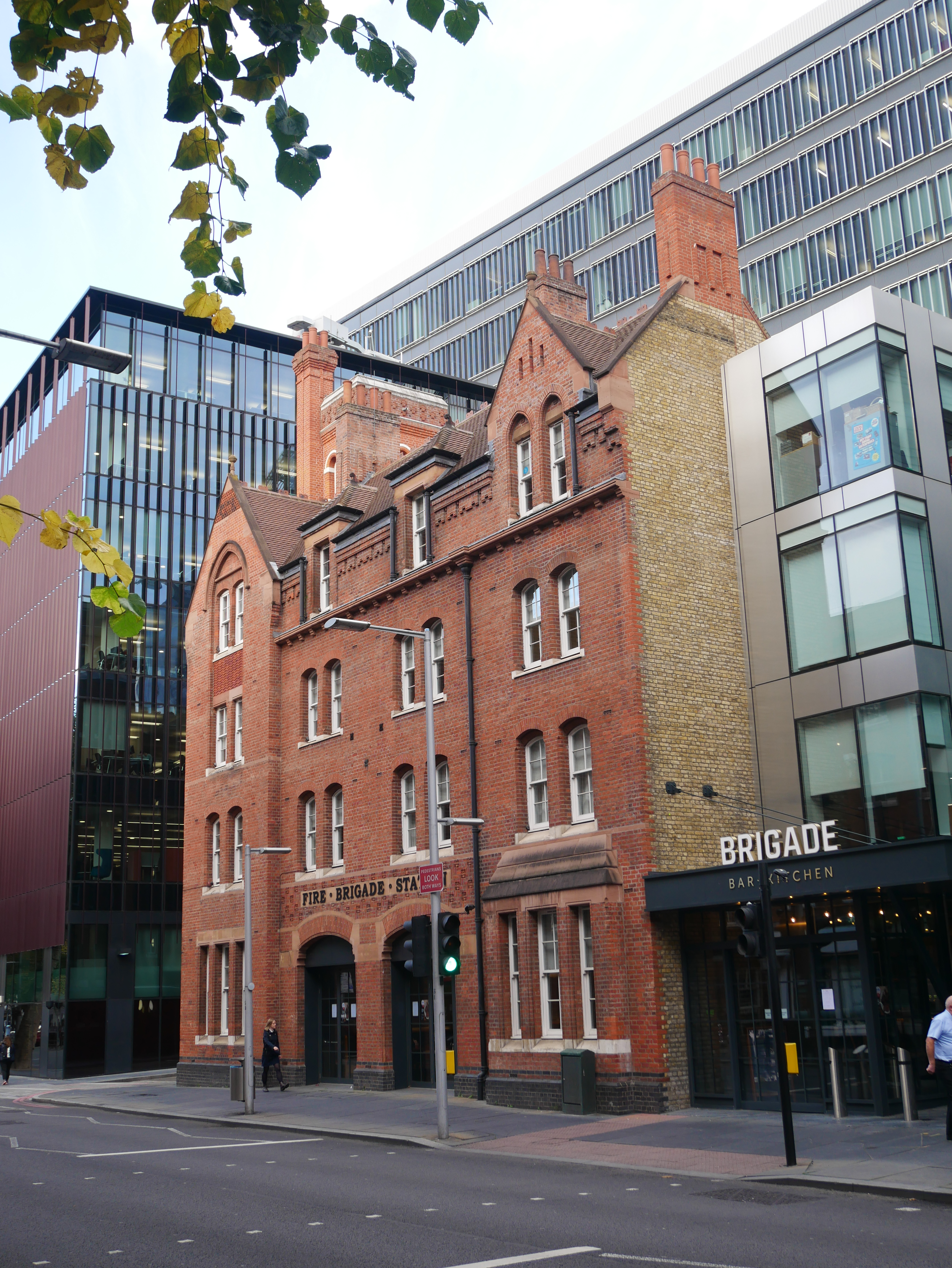
The late 19th-century fire station along Tooley Street

A 1542 map of Southwark shows only three or four features on Tooley Street, although it is not given a name on this. One of them is a pillory, set up for punishing fraudulent traders. Next to it is a "cage". This was a place to keep drunken disorderly people who were arrested too late in the day to be imprisoned. They would sleep in the cage until sober. Until 2013 the site of those medieval punishments was occupied, quite appropriately, by London Dungeon, a popular tourist attraction. It opened in 1975 and is similar to the "Chamber of Horrors" in Madame Tussaud's Museum (it is owned by Merlin Entertainments) and relocated to County Hall in 2013.

In nearby Stainer Street, off Tooley Street running under the mainline station, there is a blue plaque commemorating the 68 people who were killed in the 1941 bombing raid. Popular legend says that there was so much rubble that bodies were simply left behind, and re-buried in the masonry under London Bridge Station. Stainer Street has now been closed permanently as part of the London Bridge station redevelopment. Another museum and tourist attraction has been created under the Bridge at number 2-4 called 'The London Bridge Experience and London Tombs'; the first part of the display is an exhibition of the history of the Bridge and the other part is more of a popular entertainment similar to the 'Dungeon'.

== John Keats ==
Before being permanently closed at its northern end in 2012 to allow for the redevelopment of London Bridge station, Weston Street connected with Tooley Street opposite Hay's Galleria. In the early 19th century, before the station was built, John Keats lived in Weston Street, at that time called Dean Street, when a medical student at Guy's Hospital. It was here that he wrote the poem "On First Looking into Chapman's Homer".

== London Bridge City and More London ==
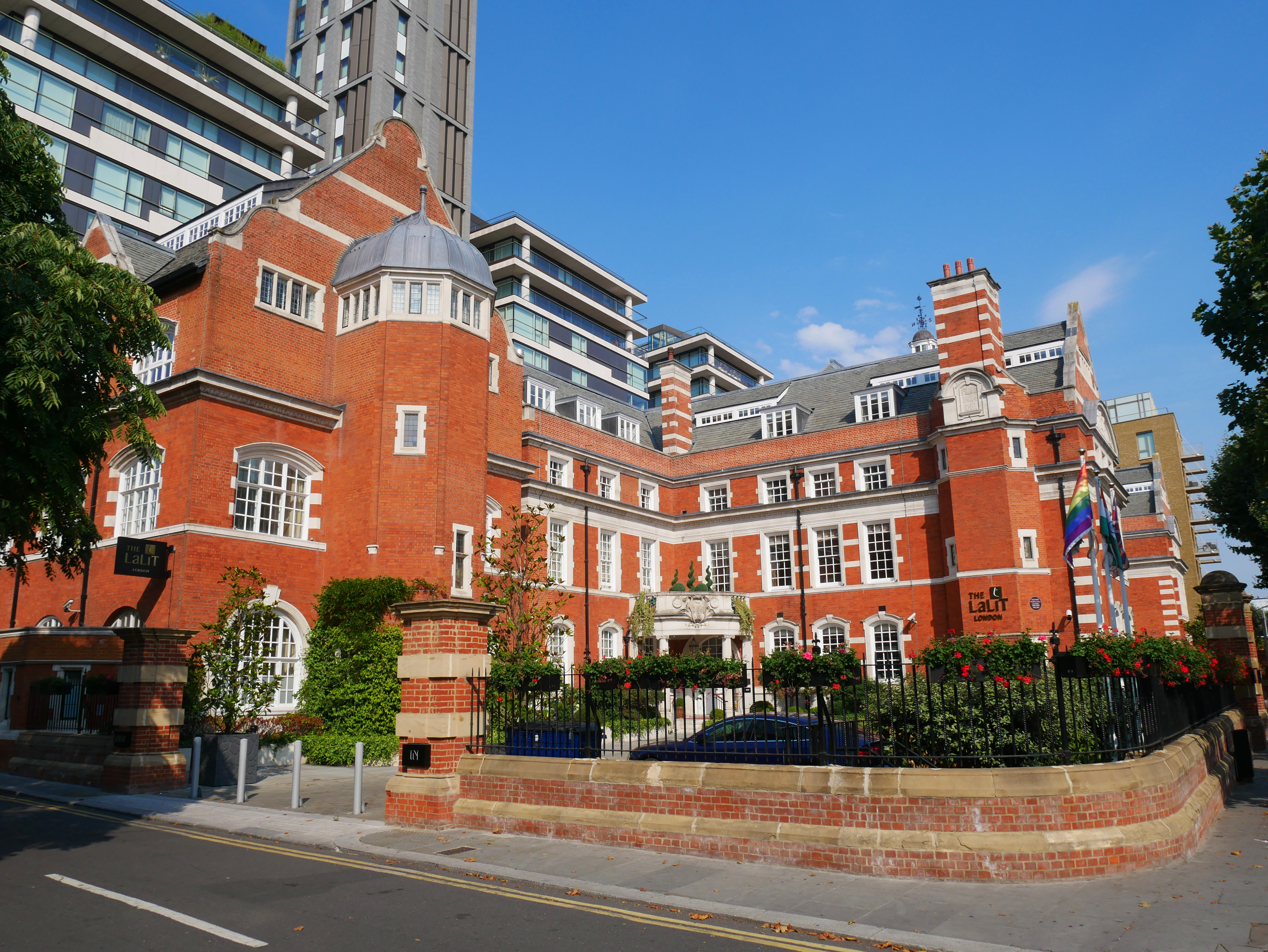
The former South London College in Tooley Street

From 1987 into the early 1990s and again in the period from 1999 to 2009, new developments between the street and the river were created. In 1987, with the increasing urban regeneration of the Thames Corridor and nearby London Docklands, the area was acquired by the St Martins Property Group as part of their London Bridge City development, stretching from London Bridge easterly to English Grounds where it is terminated by the Southwark Crown Court site. In the later campaign of urban renewal More London has been created, bounded by the Hay's Galleria site and Potters Fields. It is a pedestrian area connecting Tooley Street with London City Hall. From the Tooley Street end there are some narrow vistas of Tower Bridge, The Tower of London and City Hall. A children's theatre called The Unicorn Theatre, has been built here. 'The Scoop' is an amphitheatre or stepped area of More London upon which regular events (plays, music, open air movies) are held throughout the summertime. Besides City Hall, a number of companies have their London bases here including Visit London, Ernst and Young's European Headquarters, the law firm Norton Rose's main building and a Hilton hotel.

HMS Belfast is moored on the river front beside More London and The Queen's Walk provides a pedestrian route along the Thames on the northern perimeter of London Bridge City and More London, from Tower Bridge to London Bridge. This is part of the Jubilee Walkway.

From 2012 St George's subsidiary of Berkeley Homes erected a major high value residential development between Potters Fields and Tower Bridge Road, called One Tower Bridge; apart from flats there is mixed leisure and retail, public space, a museum - cultural attraction and a boutique hotel in the old St Olave's Grammar School building.

== Public buildings ==
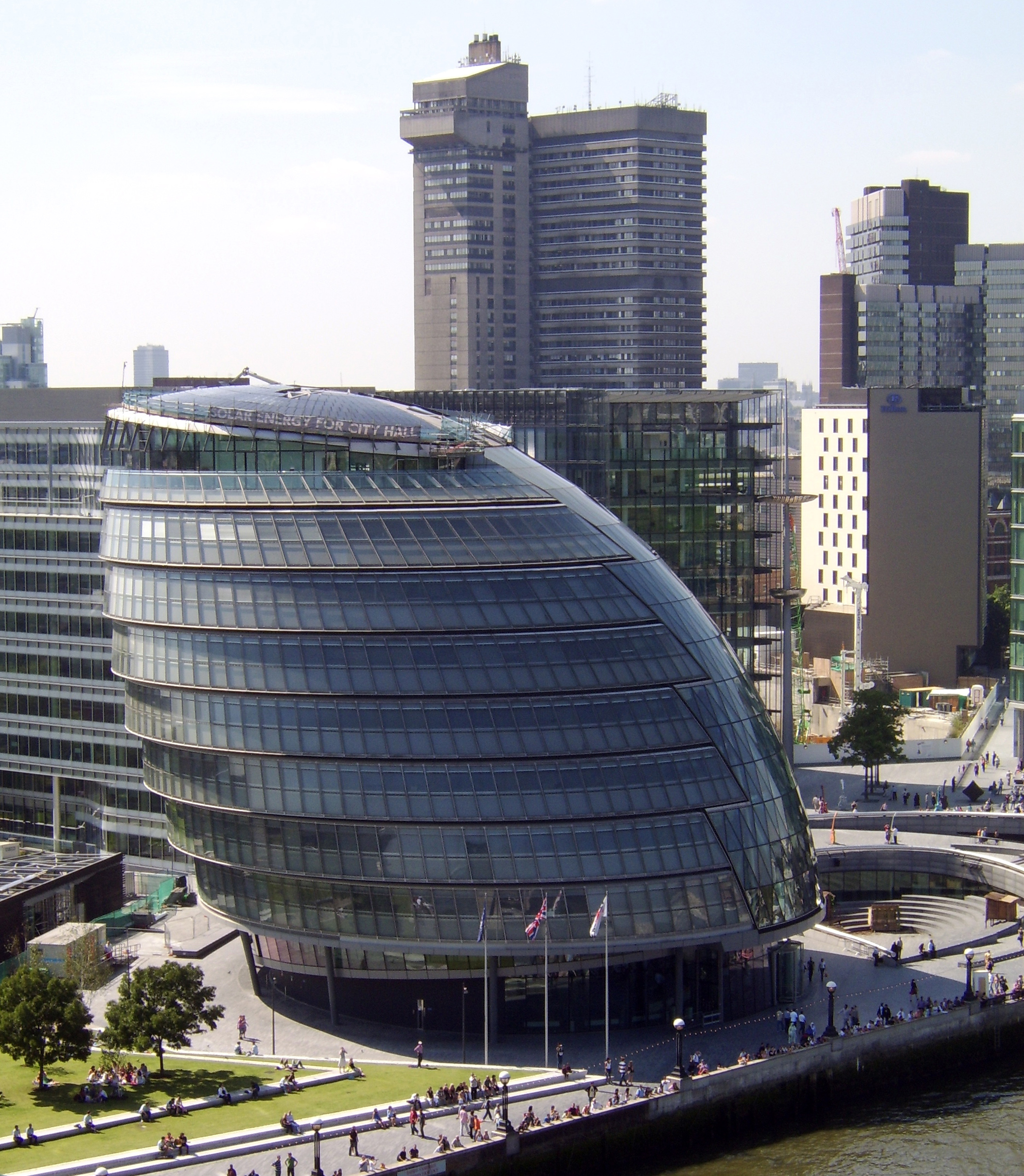
City Hall

The GLA's City Hall was opened here in 2000, although the GLA relocated to Tower Hamlets in 2021. In 2009 Southwark Council opened its new civic centre in a modern office block at 160 Tooley Street, replacing some other facilities within the Borough.

== Public houses ==
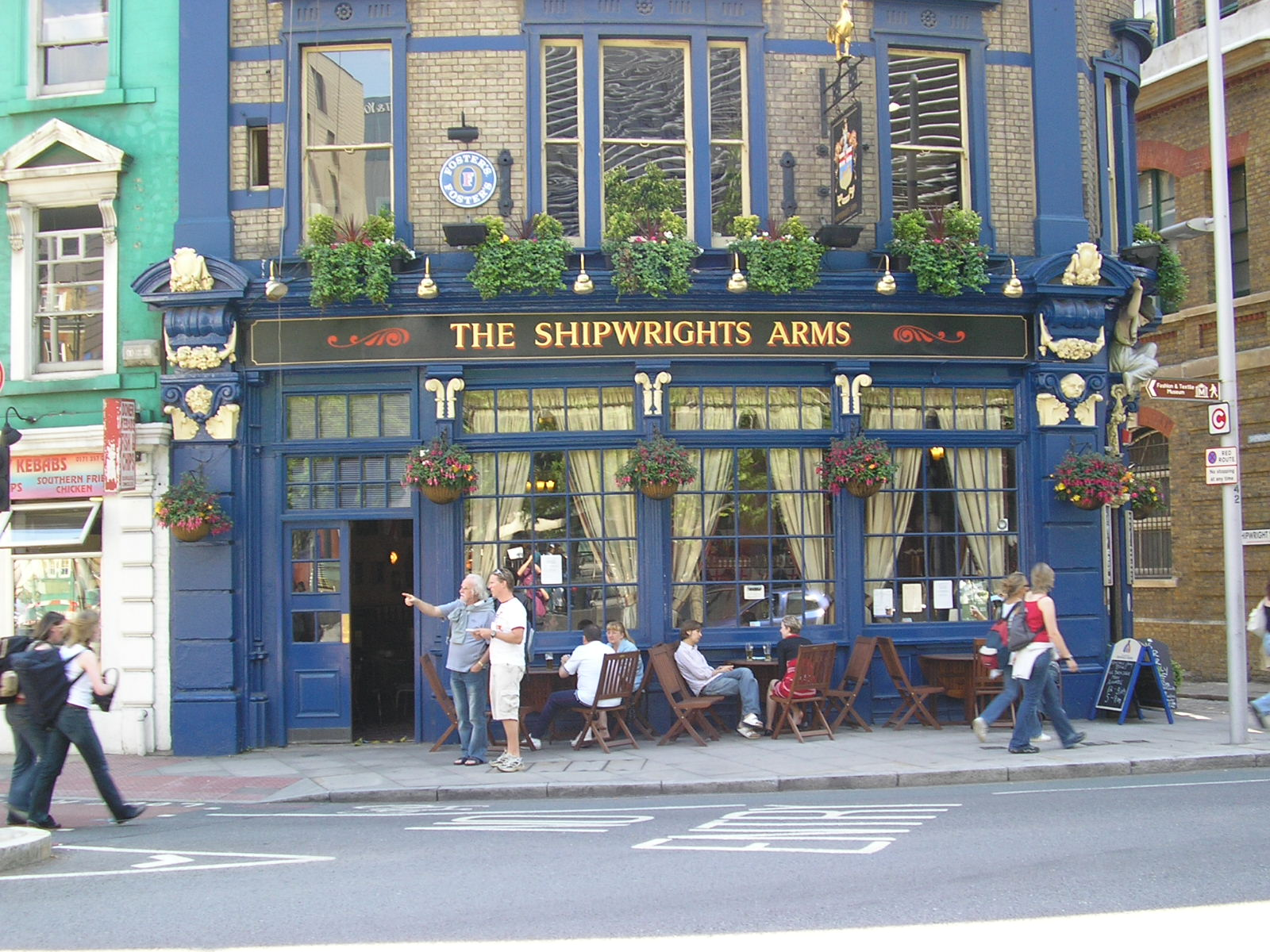
The Shipwrights Arms at No. 88

At the junction between Tooley Street and Bermondsey Street is a historic pub called "The Shipwright's Arms", recalling one of the local industries. It has a large wall of tiles showing ships being built.

To the east, The Britannia was built in 1881 and used to stand on the corner of Tooley Street and Shand Street. The building is now offices.

During the development of More London another pub, The Antigallican, was closed down. Its name celebrated a man o' war wooden battleship named after the ancient enmity that existed between the English and the French. On the same terrace the St John's Tavern also closed down. These properties are now part of Red Bull UK's headquarters.

The King Of Belgium was situated at 186 Tooley Street and is now The Bridge Lounge and Dining Room. Over the junction with Tower Bridge Road, The Pommeler's Rest takes its name from the area's centuries-old connection with the leather trade and is located in the former Tower Bridge Hotel. Further east, before Tooley Street becomes Jamaica Road, is The King's Arms.

Several streets that used to be on maps before 1999 have been swept away — Willson's Wharf, Unicorn Passage, Morgan's Lane, Stainer Street and Pickle Herring Street. The Bethell Estate that was built in the early 1930s between Tooley Street and the river was demolished in its entirety for redevelopment. This area used to house some of the poorest people in London, and fell victim to cholera in the 1840s.

Another pub called "The Royal Oak" existed on Tooley Street, and was often used as a live recording venue, once being used by British jazz drummer Phil Seamen for a recording for his album "Now! ... Live!" (1968).

== Theatres ==
Two recent additions to the street are theatres. The Unicorn Theatre is in a custom-built building, part of the More London development, that stages shows for young people, whilst the Southwark Playhouse is in a railway arch behind "The Shipwright's Arms", which relocated to Newington Causeway in 2013 because of the mainline station redevelopment.

== Public art, memorials and statues ==
On the corner of Braidwood Street on a building that is part of the London Bridge Hospital is the memorial to James Braidwood who died in the fire of 1861. In the foyer of the Cottons Centre, an office block next to the river, is a modern work of art. Likewise, within Hay's Galleria is the sculpture / fountain 'The Navigators'.

At the fork in the road between Tooley Street and Queen Elizabeth Street and Tower Bridge Road there are two statues. One is a bust of dockworkers' trade unionist, founder of the Transport & General Workers Union, Churchill's Minister of Labour during WWII and Attlee's Foreign Secretary Ernest Bevin. This is somewhat overshadowed by the full size monument to local worthy Samuel Bourne Bevington, a member of a Bermondsey leather manufacturing dynasty and philanthropist. He is represented as the first Mayor of the Metropolitan Borough of Bermondsey, which incorporated this street, and was erected shortly after his death in 1908.

== Anecdotal culture ==
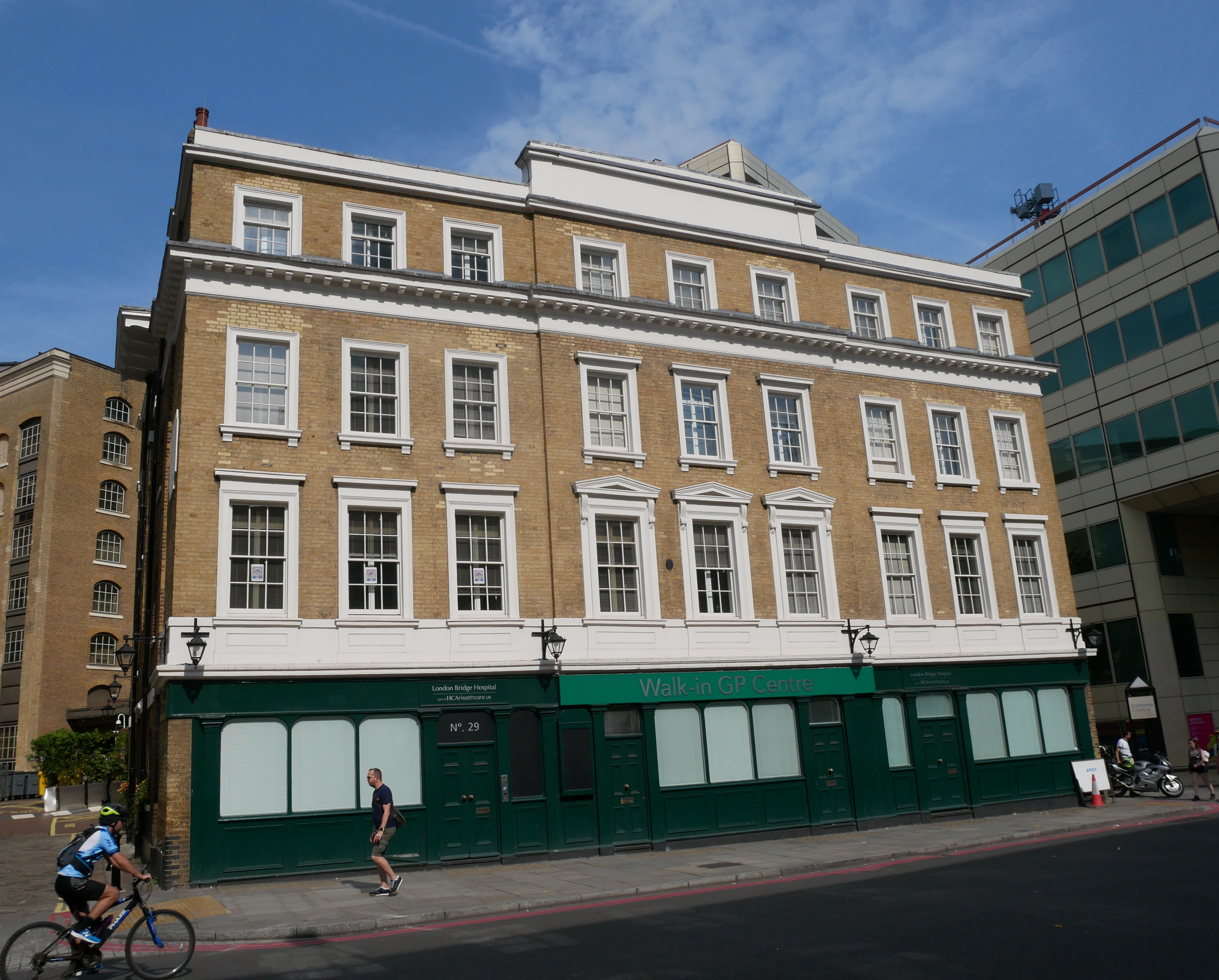
The Grade II listed building at 29, 31, and 33 Tooley Street

"The Three Tailors of Tooley Street" is a remark made in regard to any small group pretending to greater representative authority than they have in reality. It is based on the tale that the eponymous characters wanted to have some exemption from a local rate and were informed they would have to petition the Privy Council; accordingly they drafted their appeal, which began with the phrase "We, The People of England ...". It is notable that by far the largest trade occupation in the street on the Bridge House Rent Roll prepared for the Poll Tax of 1381 was that of the tailors.

== Tooley Street conservation area ==
Tooley Street was designated as two Conservation Areas in June 1988 (Tooley Street South) and February 1991 (Tooley Street South).

There are 17 listed buildings in the conservation area, including: St Olave's Grammar School (exterior and parts interior Grade II*), St. Olaf House (Grade II*); Hay's Galleria (Grade II), Denmark House (Grade II), Aston Webb House (Grade II), London Bridge Hospital (Grade II), the Dixon Hotel, formerly the Tower Bridge Magistrates' Court and Police Station (Grade II exterior) and The Shipwright's Arms public house (Grade II).

Many other buildings have been renovated or had modern structures placed behind "retained facades" to maintain and enhance the visual amenity heritage of the area. However, Network Rail made a successful planning application to demolish the old Railway Bonded Warehouse and offices between Bermondsey Street and Weston Street to open up the mainline Station arches for new concourses and passenger circulation areas from Tooley Street into the London Bridge Station complex.

Southwark Council has also identified a number of buildings on Tooley Street that, whilst unlisted, make a "positive contribution" to the local area, including: The Antigallican public house, Devon Mansions, and Magdalen House.

== London Bridge station ==
London Bridge station was originally called Tooley Street and opened 1836. It was redeveloped between 1972 and 1978 by British Rail and was again redeveloped entirely as part of the Thameslink Programme. This opened in 2018 and saw the main access move from the west facing London Bridge Street concourse to a new north facing Tooley Street entrance. There is new public pedestrian space adjacent to the More London Estate leading south through the Victorian railway viaduct to St Thomas Street via a new concourse, incorporating the whole of Stainer Street and the northern part of Weston Street.

== See also ==
- London Bridge station
- The London Bridge Experience
