= Harry Beasley =

Harry Beasley may refer to:

- Harry Geoffrey Beasley (1881–1939), British anthropologist
- Harry C. Beasley (1888–1931), United States Navy seaman
- Harry Beasley (athlete) (1892–1972), Canadian Olympic sprinter
- Harry Beasley (footballer) (1919–1979), Australian rules footballer
