= Elsie March =

English sculptor

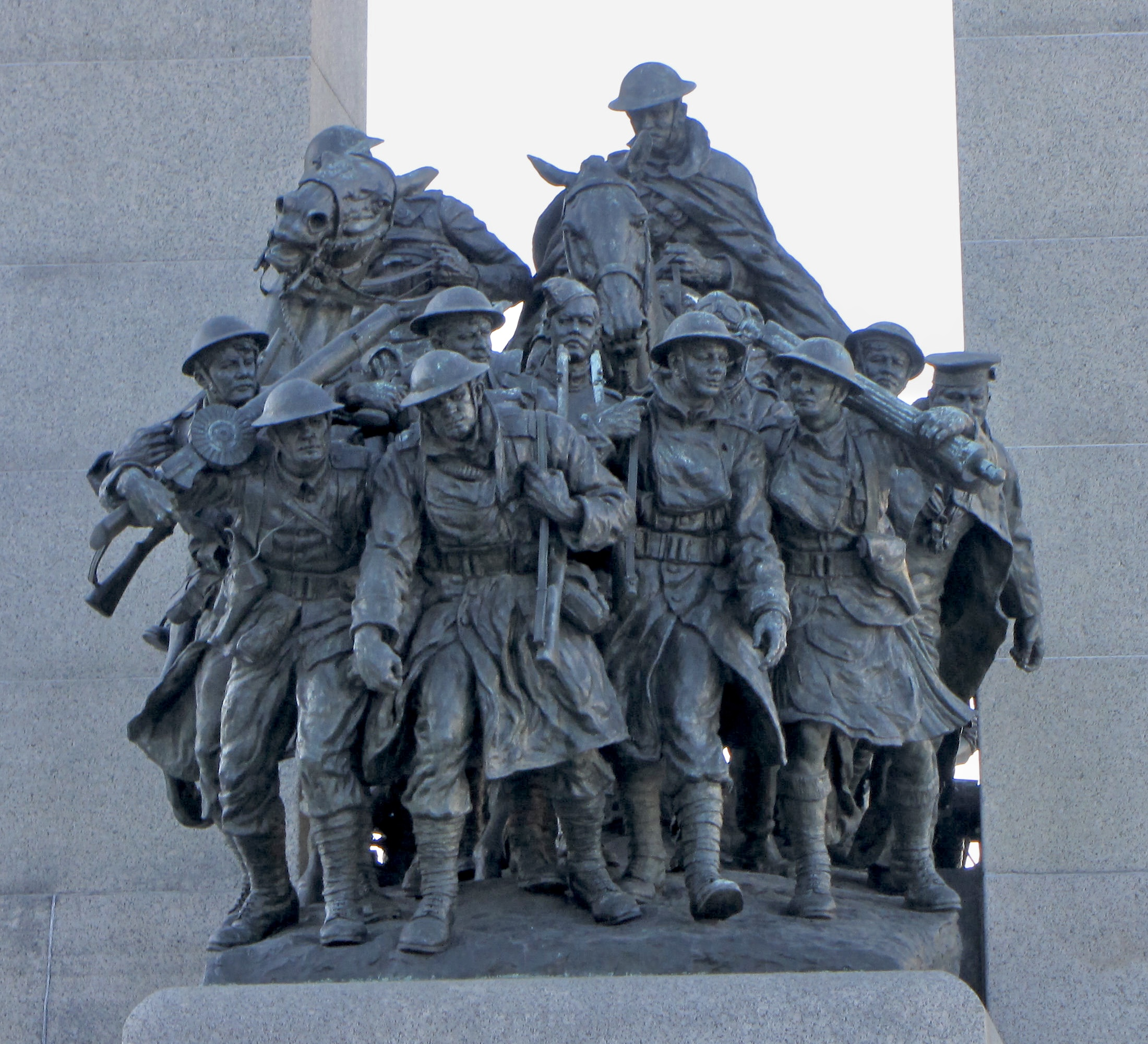
- Two service-women are included among the bronze figures of the National War Memorial.
- Born: 3 October 1884; Kingston upon Hull, England
- Died: 1974, Second quarter Kent, England
- Known for: Sculpture, Metalwork, Painting
- Notable work: "National War Memorial of Canada" "Portrait of Harry Geoffrey Beasley" "Mother and Child"
- Awards: Lady Feodora Gleichen Fund

Elsie March (3 October 1884– 1974) was an English sculptor and one of eight artists in her family. After the death of her brother Vernon March, she and her brothers completed the National War Memorial of Canada in Ottawa, Ontario. One of the family's three sculptors, her focus earlier in her career was metalwork and painting.

== Background ==
Elsie March was the daughter of George Henry March and his wife Elizabeth Blenkin, was born in Kingston upon Hull, England. Her father was employed as a seed crusher foreman (oil miller) in Yorkshire. The family had moved by 1901 to Battersea in London, where her father worked as a builder's clerk. Elsie was the seventh of nine children, eight of whom became artists. Three of them were sculptors, Sydney, Elsie, and Vernon. The other five artist siblings were Edward, Percival, Frederick, Dudley and Walter. The ninth sibling was her sister Eva Blenkin March. Both of their parents died in 1904.

By the 1911 census, all nine siblings, still single, were living together at the 17-room family home of Goddendene in Locksbottom, Farnborough, Kent. Only two of the March siblings married, producing three children between them. Elsie's sister Eva married Charles Francis Newman in 1916. They had one child, a daughter, Heather. Her brother Frederick married a Scottish women, Agnes Annie Gow, in 1926 and they had two children.

== Career ==
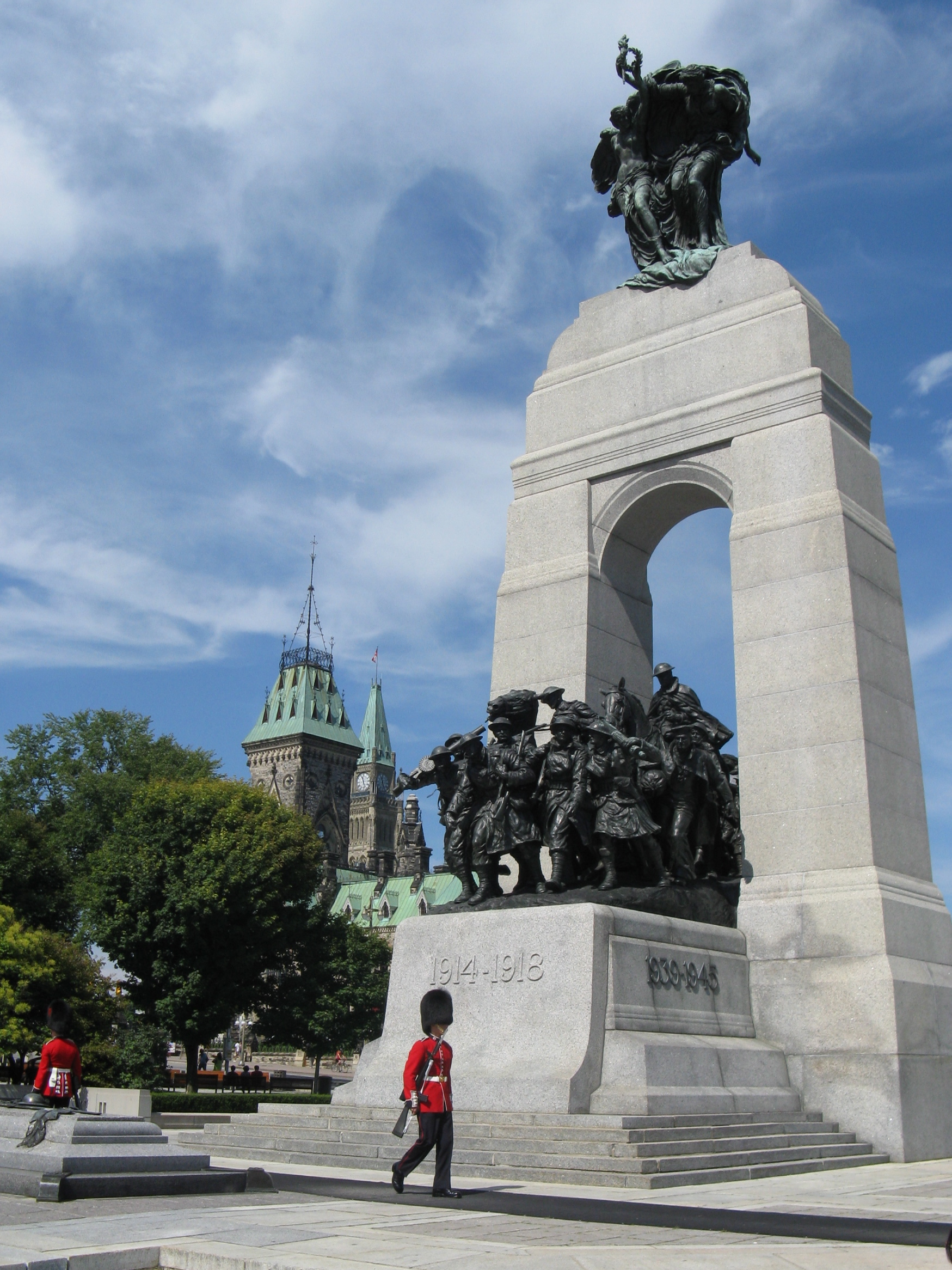
National War Memorial of Canada

Elsie and her brothers established three large studios, including a metal foundry, in the seven acre grounds of the family home of Goddendene in Locksbottom, Farnborough after 1901. The studios had walls that could be slid back to allow the siblings to work in natural light and were tall enough that they could be utilised during wartime to hang up parachutes to dry.

The siblings collaborated on the sculptures of The Response, the National War Memorial of Canada in Ottawa, Ontario. Vernon March, after an open, worldwide competition held in 1925, was one of seven finalists out of a total of 127 entrants. The seven finalists were asked to submit scale models of their designs. Vernon was awarded the commission in January 1926, with his theme of "The Great Response of Canada." However, the monument had not yet been completed when Vernon died of pneumonia in 1930.

Elsie and five of her brothers completed the bronze statues for the memorial. The siblings moulded the figures in clay, cast them in plaster, and then created the bronzes at their studio foundry at Goddendene, completing the work by July 1932. However, construction of the arch of the monument in Canada could not start because the site was not prepared. Instead, the bronze memorial groups were mounted on a base and displayed at Hyde Park in London for six months. Later, the figures were stored in the studio at Goddendene; they were sent to Ottawa in 1937. It was there that the memorial base and arch were built after a contract was won by Montreal contractors E.G.M. Cape and Company in December 1937. March family members directed construction of the granite monument. The memorial, including installation of the bronzes, was completed on 19 October 1938. Landscaping of the surrounding area was completed in time for the Royal visit the following spring.

The National War Memorial of Canada commemorates the Canadian response during World War I. It was unveiled by King George VI on 21 May 1939 during a ceremony witnessed by an estimated 100,000 people. Vernon's design included large bronze statues of Victory and Liberty on top of an arch. Below the arch, at the rear of the monument, there is a cannon. The memorial also features 22 bronze figures under the arch which represent the branches of the Canadian military that existed during the First World War. Included among them are the figures of two service-women.

Members of the March family also created smaller-scale works. Elsie March sculpted a bronze portrait bust of Harry Geoffrey Beasley (1882–1939), British anthropologist and museum curator, and a collector of ethnographic material. The bust, dated April 1939, is in the British Museum. An exhibition of the March family's works was held at the Grosvenor Hotel in London in 1981. In addition, on 2 August 1982, an auction of pictures and sculpture by six members of the March family took place at Sotheby's in London. Among the works created by Elsie were: a large sculpture of Sir Winston Churchill, a bust of Lawrence of Arabia dated 1936, a bust of Beethoven dated 1920, and a portrait bust entitled "Wendy" and dated 1953. Early in her career, Elsie focused more on portrait painting and metalwork, producing items in a variety of metals, often silver, sometimes ornamented with enamels.

In 1919, Elsie March exhibited two works at the Royal Glasgow Institute of the Fine Arts. She exhibited seven times at Royal Academy summer exhibition with a total of nine works. In 1943, she won the Lady Feodora Gleichen prize initially administered by the Royal Academy of Arts and later the Royal Society of British Sculptors. March was one of two recipients that year, for her terracotta statuette entitled "Mother and Child."

== Bronze figures of the National War Memorial ==
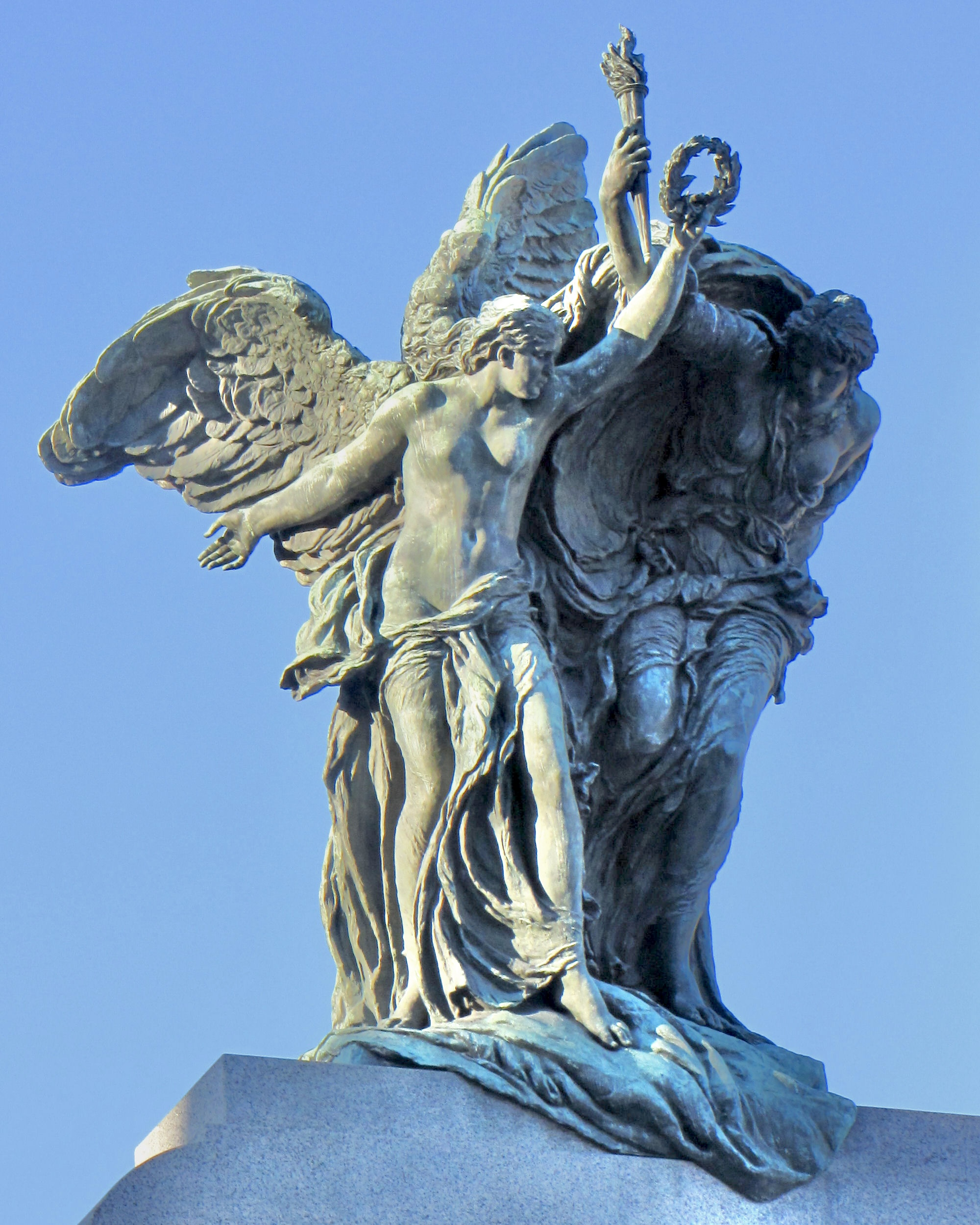
Top

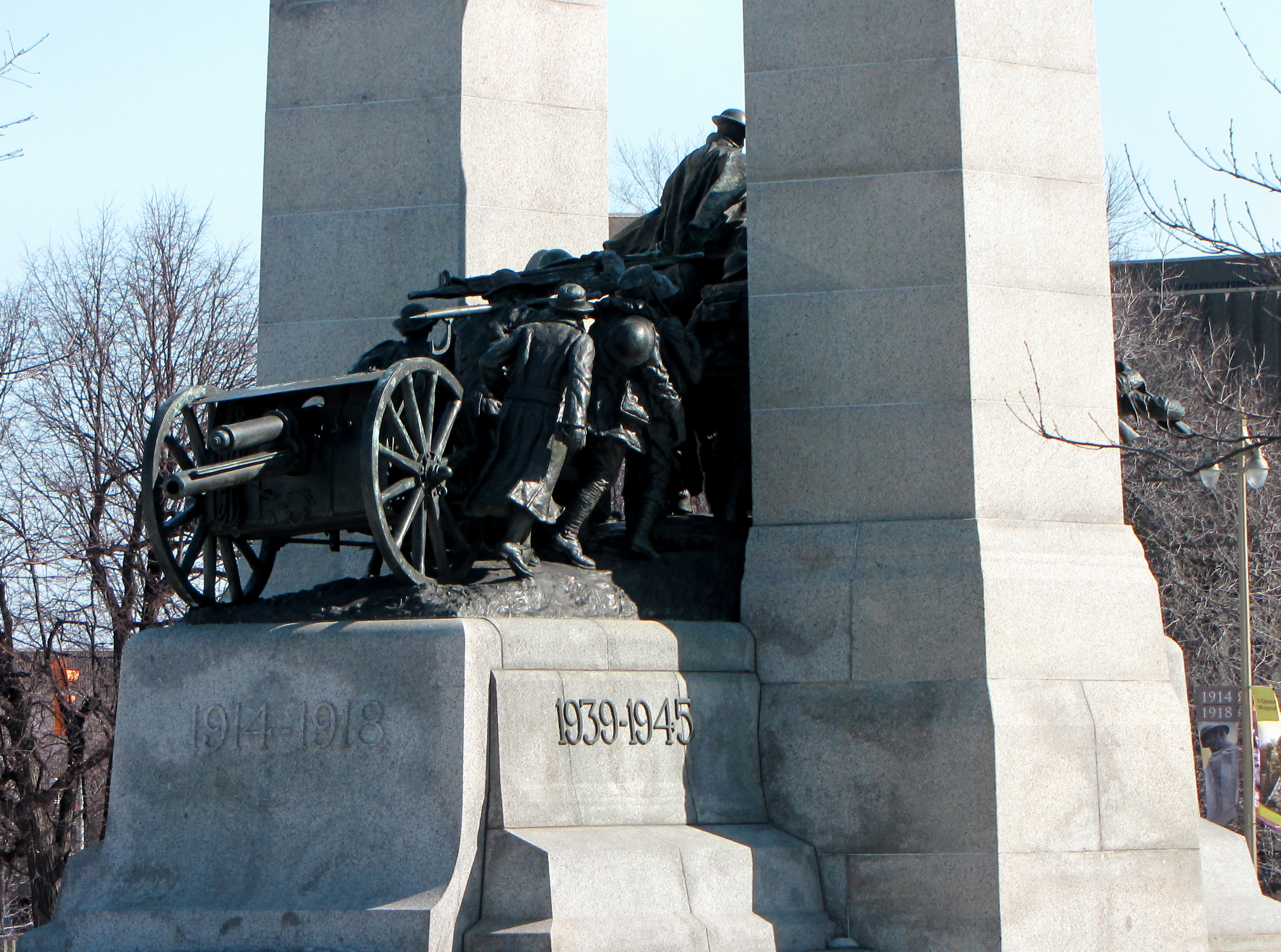
Rear

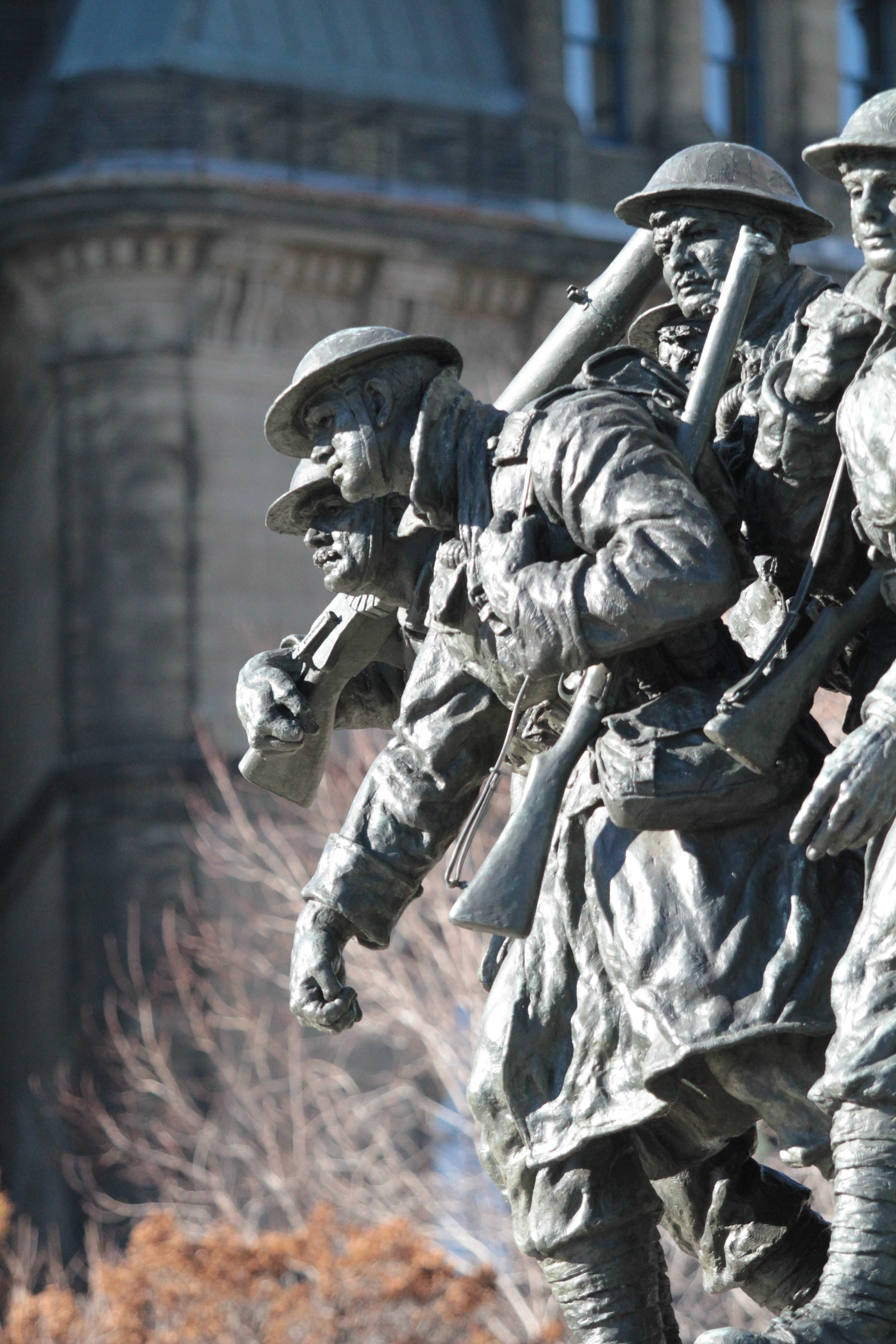
Soldiers

== Other collaborative works ==
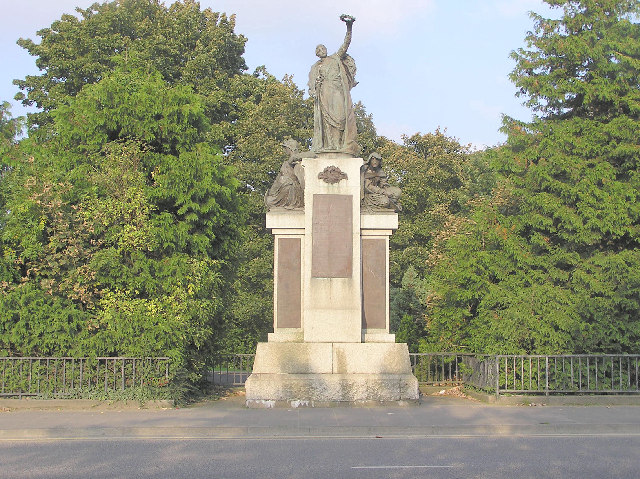
Royal Inniskilling Fusiliers South African War Memorial in Omagh

One of the first monuments on which the March family collaborated was the Royal Inniskilling Fusiliers South African War Memorial. All of the March artists had a hand in the creation of the memorial that was dedicated to the Inniskilling Fusiliers who died in the Boer War. Members of the family installed it themselves in 1902. The monument was originally located on High Street in Omagh, County Tyrone and unveiled by the Duchess of Abercorn on 25 November 1904. However, it was moved to Drumragh Avenue in 1964 because it was considered a traffic hazard.

Other works on which the family collaborated include the Lewes War Memorial on the High Street at Lewes in East Sussex. Vernon March was the primary sculptor. The war memorial includes a central obelisk of Portland stone topped by a globe upon which a bronze winged Victory stands, her arms held aloft, a laurel wreath in one hand. Other bronze angels sit at the base of the war memorial, next to shields listing the names of deceased soldiers of World War I. The monument was unveiled on 6 September 1922. It was rededicated on 1 March 1981, such that the fallen of the Second World War could also be commemorated. The Lewes War Memorial is on the National Heritage List for England.

The war memorial at Sydenham, London, which commemorates the fallen soldiers of World War I and II who were employees of the South Suburban Gas Company. The monument features a bronze figure of Victory with bronze plaques listing the names of the fallen soldiers, and those from the company who served in the wars. Sydney March was the main sculptor for the Livesey Hall War Memorial, also known as the Sydenham War Memorial, which was unveiled by Lord Robert Cecil on 4 June 1920. In October 2011, the three bronze plaques from the front of the monument were stolen.

== Death ==
Elsie March died at age 89 in the second quarter of 1974 in the county of Kent, England. She was the last surviving March sibling. Most of the members of the March family, including parents George and Elizabeth, are buried at Saint Giles the Abbot Churchyard in Farnborough. Their grave is marked by a bronze angel monument sculpted by her brother Sydney March in 1922. Elsie's ashes were buried in the family plot on 7 June 1974. Her sister Eva was not interred at Saint Giles. She died in 1964.

== Legacy ==
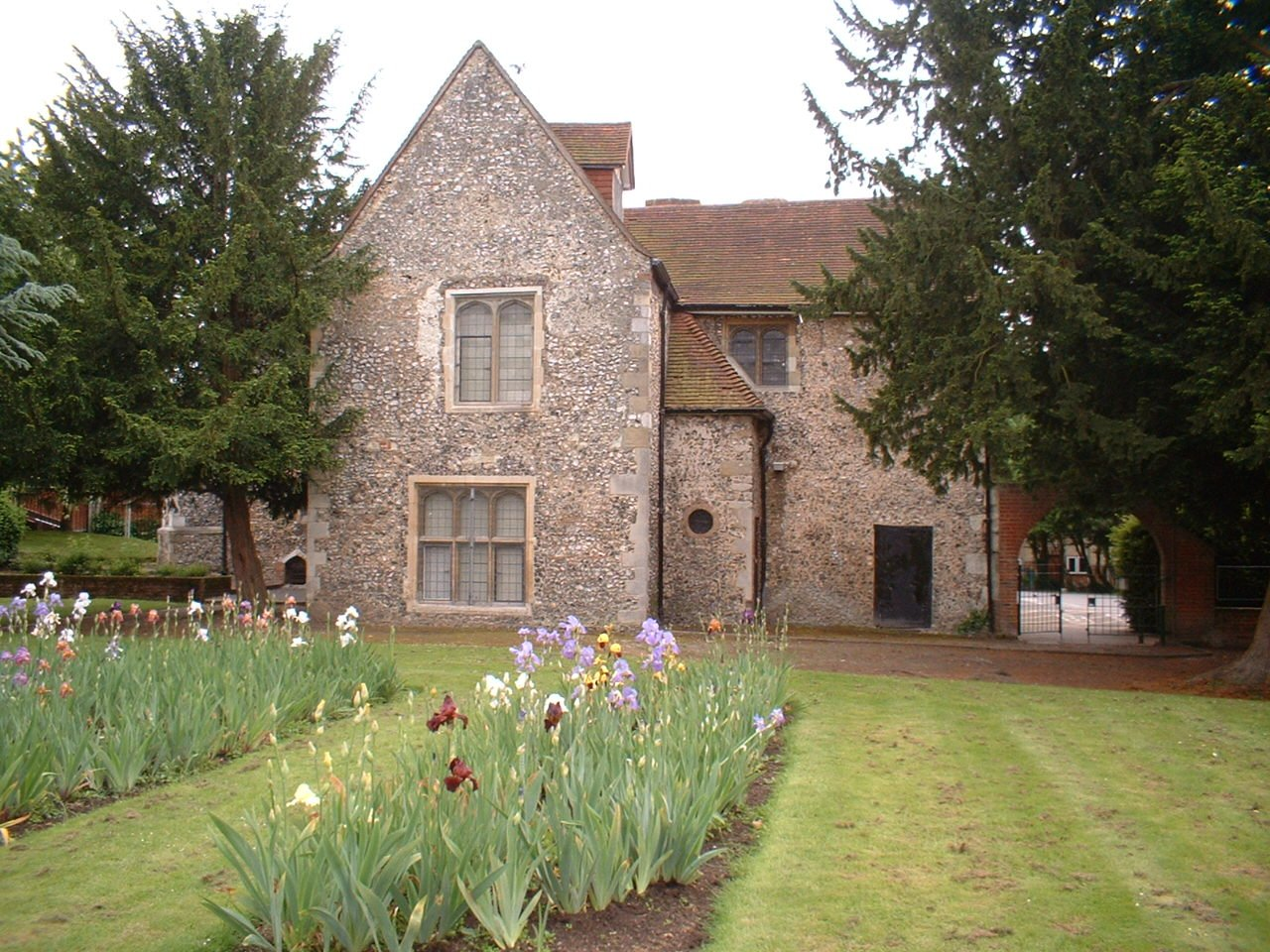
The Priory in Orpington

The Chelsfield Village Voice in April 2011 detailed the substance of a lecture that historian Paul Rason gave the previous month to the local history group. The talk was accompanied by photographs, including some of Goddendene. There were also images of the bronze figures of the National War Memorial of Canada. In addition, an exhibition featuring the work of local artists was held in 2011 in the Bromley Museum at The Priory on Church Hill in Orpington, in the London Borough of Bromley. The exhibition included scale models made by the March artists. Elsie March's bust of Sir Winston Churchill is displayed at the Bromley Library. Her bust of Harry Geoffrey Beasley is at the British Museum in London. Also, a black and white, silent movie filmed in 1924 reveals the March artists at work in their studios at Goddendene, and has been reproduced by British Pathé.
