= Lewes War Memorial =

War memorial in Lewes, England

Coordinates: 50°52′24″N 0°00′40″E

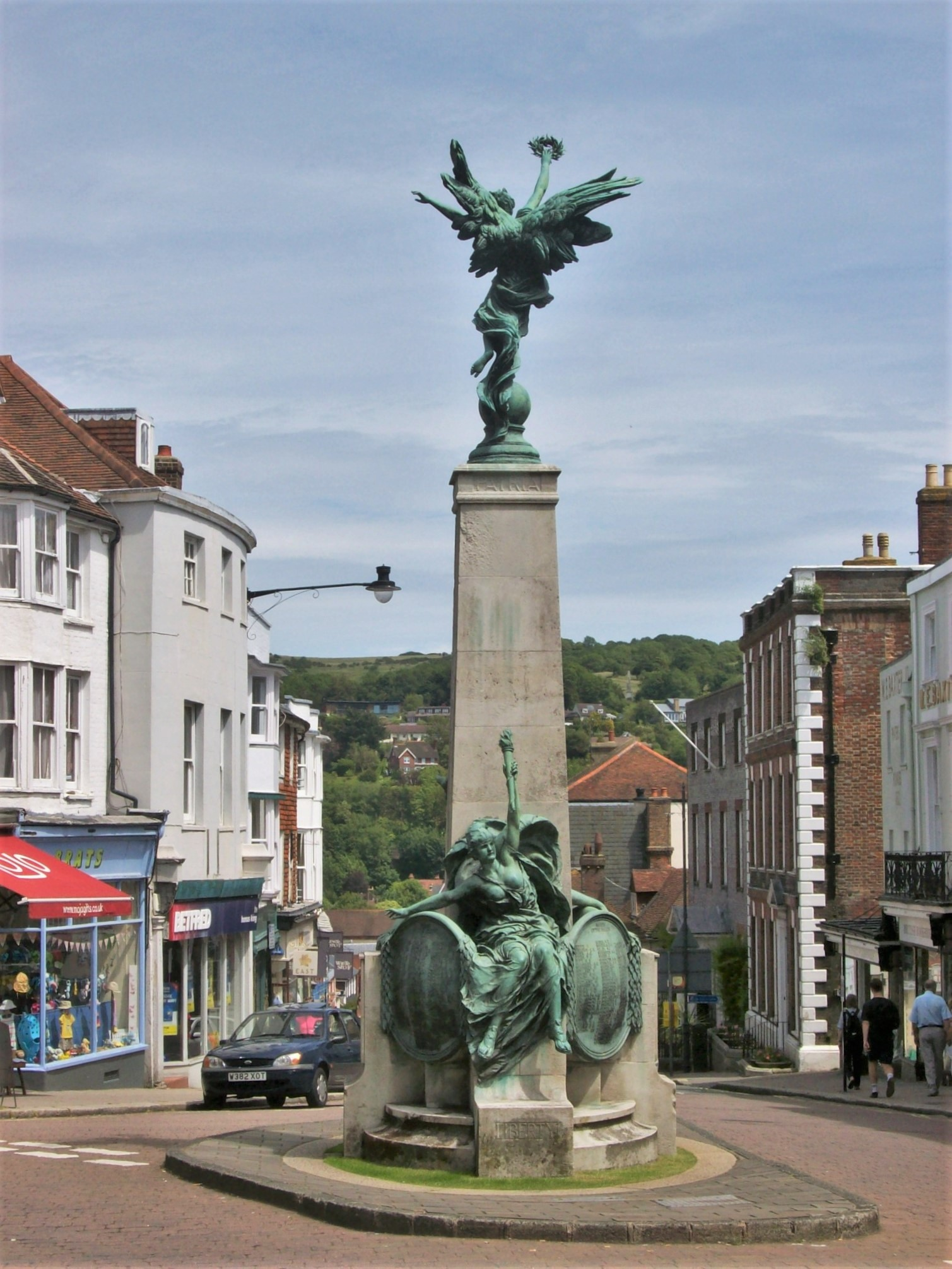
Lewes War Memorial

Lewes War Memorial is a war memorial at the top of School Hill in the centre of Lewes in East Sussex, prominently sited at the junction of High Street and Market Street. It commemorates 251 men from Lewes who died in the First World War, and 126 who died in the Second World War. It was unveiled in 1922 and became a listed building in 1985.

The memorial was designed by the artist Vernon March. He also designed the Canadian National War Memorial in Ottawa, the Cenotaph in Cape Town, and Diamond War Memorial in Northern Ireland.

It was constructed in the centre of Lewes, on a site formerly occupied by an ornate lamppost. It comprises a Portland stone obelisk with bronze statuary. The obelisk stands on a cruciform stone plinth, with steps between the pairs of piers leading up to bronze shields. It is topped by a bronze statue of a winged Victory standing on a globe, facing east towards the fields of Flanders, holding up a laurel wreath. The base features two bronze statues: Liberty seated to the west holding a torch, and Peace seated to the east with a dove on her shoulder. To one side of the figure of Peace is a bronze shield facing south east, inscribed "IN MEMORY OF / THE MEN OF LEWES / WHO DIED / FOR THEIR COUNTRY / AND FOR MANKIND / IN THE GREAT WAR / 1914 1918". The three shields between the other piers of the memorial bear 251 names of the fallen from the First World War.

The memorial was unveiled in 1922 by General Sir Henry Sclater, a local landowner who was also General Officer Commanding-in-Chief Southern Command in 1916 to 1919. It was dedicated by the Bishop of Lewes, Henry Southwell.

A quotation from Winston Churchill – "THIS WAS THEIR FINEST HOUR" – was carved into the north face of the obelisk in 1950. The monument was rededicated in 1981, after plaques listing the names of 127 fallen from the Second World War were added to the north and south faces of the plinth, with an additional inscription added to the south face of the obelisk: "LIKEWISE / REMEMBER / THOSE OF / THIS TOWN / WHO GAVE / THEIR LIVES / IN THE WAR / 1939–1945".

It became a Grade II listed building in 1985, and was promoted to Grade II* in October 2014.

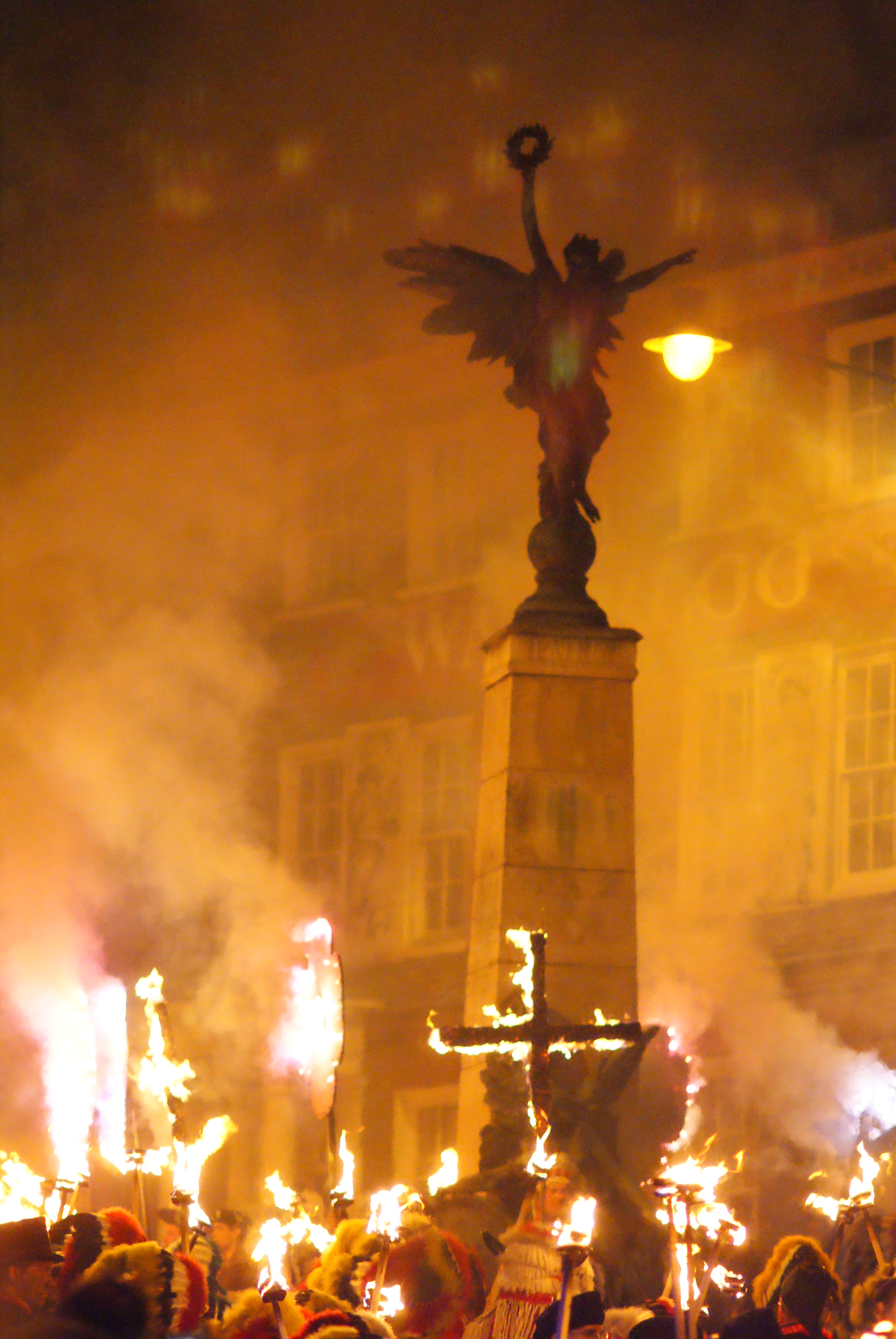
The memorial during Lewes Bonfire Night festivities

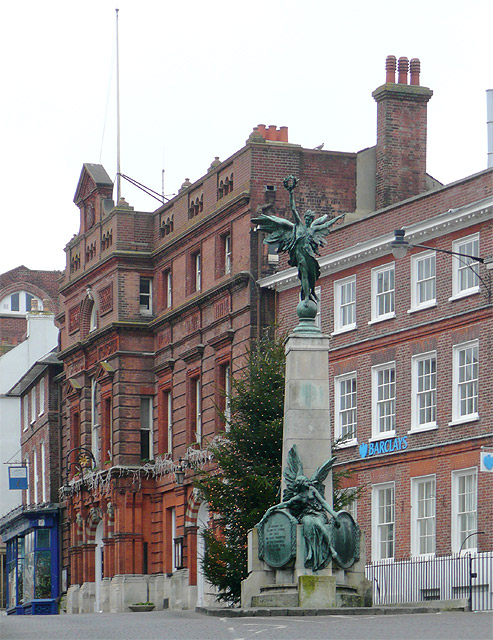
Front view

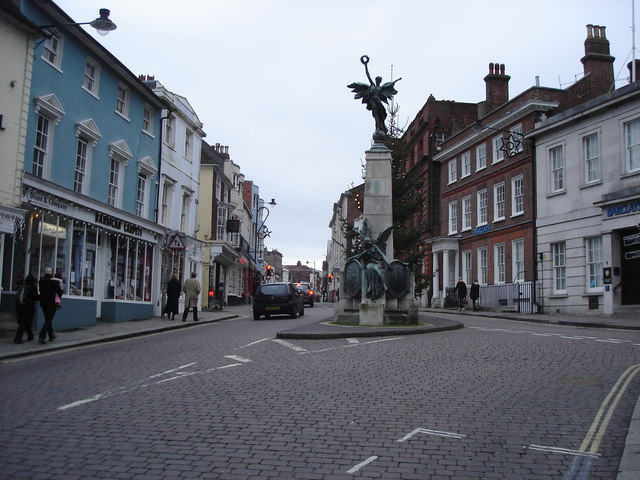
Setting at a road junction

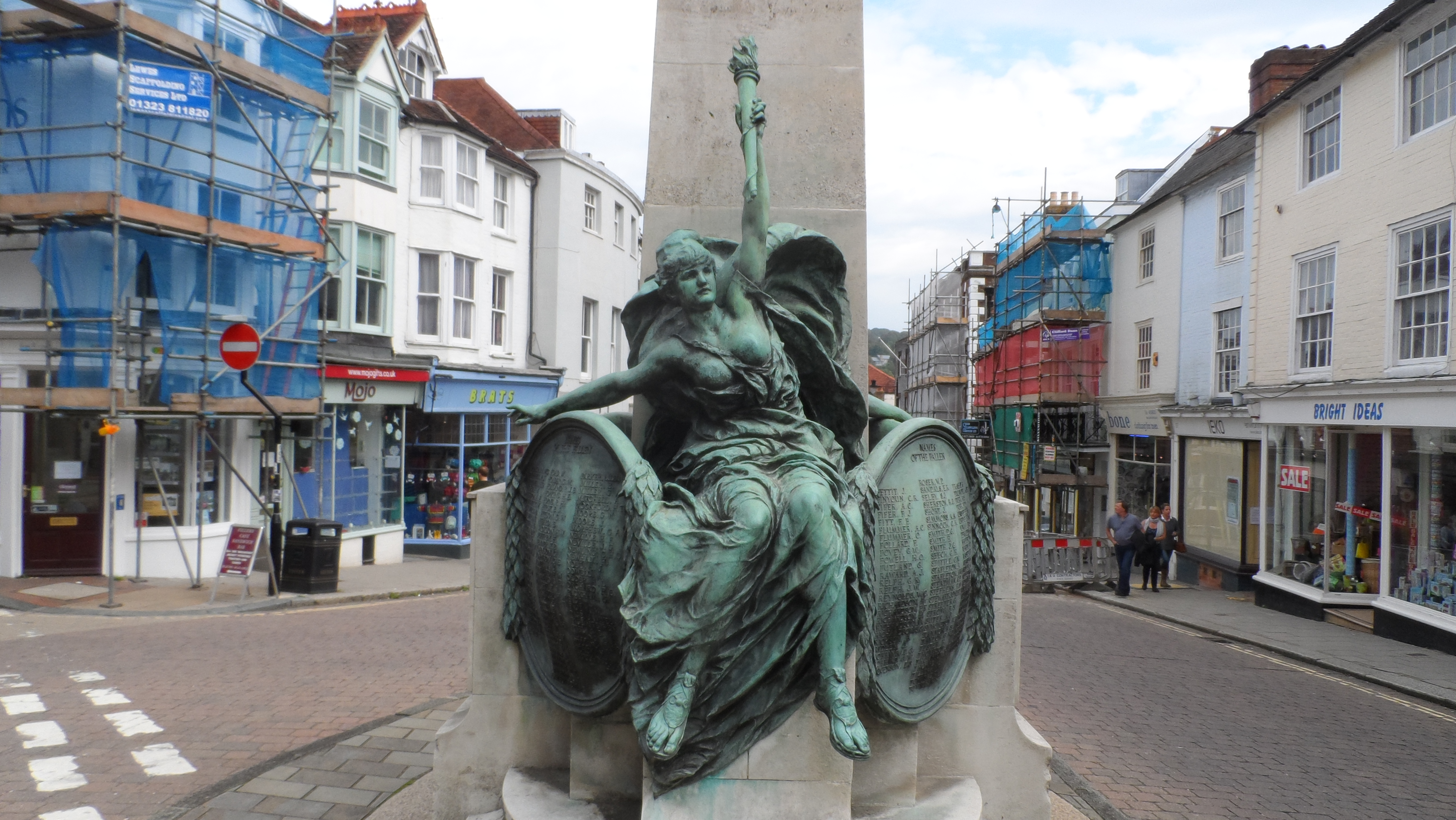
Liberty

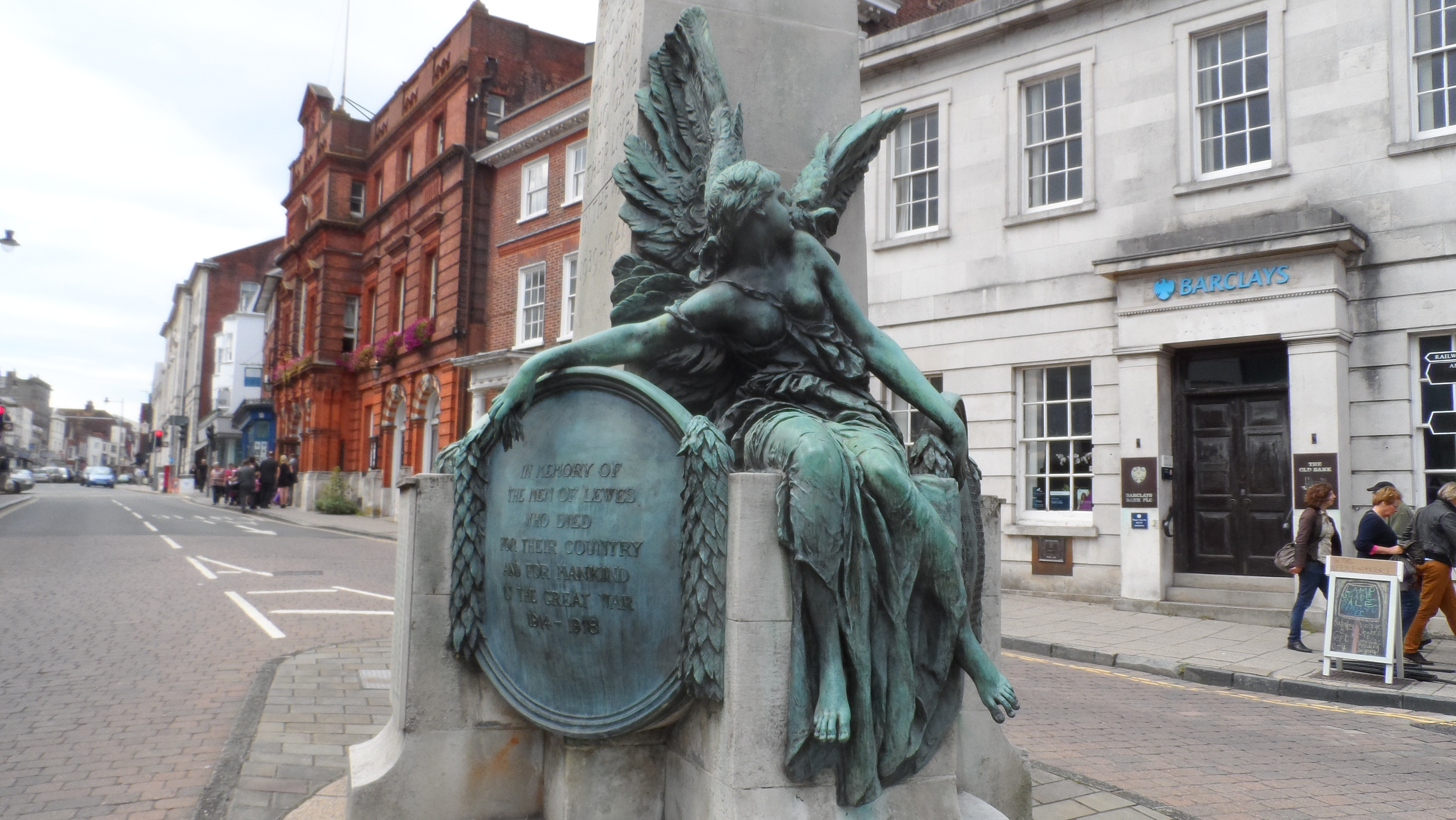
Peace

== See also ==
- Russian Memorial, Lewes
- Grade II* listed war memorials in England
