= Harry Beasley (footballer) =

Australian rules footballer

Personal information
- Full name: Henry Beasley
- Born: 26 July 1919; Forrest, Victoria
- Died: 17 January 1979 (aged 59); Geelong, Victoria
- Original team: Birregurra
- Height: 184 cm (6 ft 0 in)
- Weight: 84 kg (185 lb)

Playing career^{1}
Years	Club	Games (Goals)
1944	Geelong	3 (0)
- ^{1} Playing statistics correct to the end of 1944.

Henry Beasley (26 July 1919 – 17 January 1979) was an Australian rules footballer who played with Geelong in the Victorian Football League (VFL).

== Family ==
The son of Richard Rickard Beasley (1873–1951), and Elizabeth Beasley (1883–1952), née Mackay, Henry Beasley was born at Forrest, Victoria on 26 July 1919.

He married Beryl Ester Lillian Kemmis (1919–2005) in 1940.

== Football ==
He played in three First XVIII matches for Geelong in 1944.

== Military service ==
He served with the Second AIF during World War Two.
