= The Cenotaph, Cape Town =

War memorial in Cape Town, South Africa

The Cenotaph
- South Africa
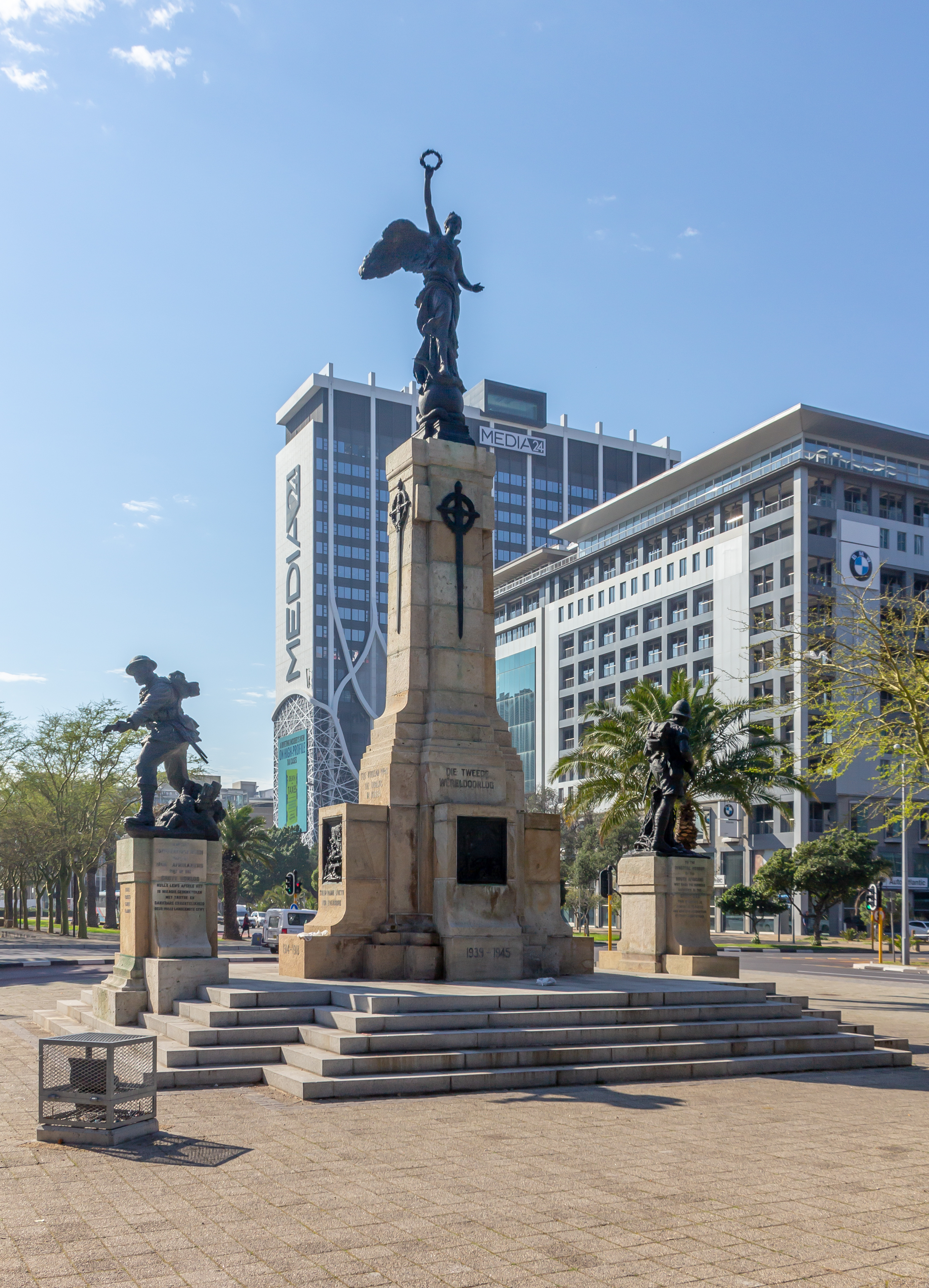
- For soldiers who died in World War I, World War II and the Korean War
- Unveiled: 3 August 1924
- Location: 33.9187°S 18.4268°E; Cape Town
- Designed by: Vernon March
- To the immortal honour of the South Africans who made the supreme sacrifice in the Great War; This memorial is dedicated in proud and grateful recognition by their countrymen Sea and Air; Their name liveth for evermore 1914–1918; The Second world war 1939–1945; The Korean war 1950–1953

The Cenotaph is a war memorial on Heerengracht Street in Cape Town. The city's annual Remembrance Day ceremonies are held there. It is classified as a public memorial and as such is subject to protection in terms of heritage legislation administered by Heritage Western Cape, the provincial heritage resources authority of the Western Cape province of South Africa.

== Purpose ==
First unveiled in 1924 to commemorate soldiers who died in World War I, it also commemorates soldiers who subsequently died in World War II and the Korean War. The City of Cape Town holds Remembrance Day ceremonies at the Cenotaph annually at 11am on the Sunday closest to 11 November. The wreath laying ceremonies include the wearing of red remembrance poppies, the "Last Post" bugle call and the observation of a two-minute silence.

The Cenotaph was unveiled on 3 August 1924 by South Africa's then Governor-General Alexander Cambridge, 1st Earl of Athlone, who said:

I cannot but believe that the existence of these visible memorials, which are to be found throughout the world – silent witnesses to the desolation of the war – will through the years to come, be potent advocates of peace and will eventually serve to draw all peoples together in mutual understanding.

== Design ==
The memorial was designed by English sculptor Vernon March and comprises two bronze figures of soldiers in action on separate sandstone columns, one on either side of a tall central sandstone column supporting a bronze winged victory figure. One of the flanking soldier figures depicts South Africans in World War I who fought in the East African Campaign and the other depicts those who fought in the Western Front. The winged victory figure, modelled on the Winged Victory of Samothrace, faces Table Mountain holding a laurel wreath high and treading on a serpent wrapped around a globe. The central column, decorated with bronze wreathed swords at the top, stands 8 metres (26 ft) tall. Four bronze plaques at its base depict various battle scenes, including a trench scene of the Battle of Delville Wood, an artillery scene, an aircraft scene and a hospital scene. Inscriptions on the memorial are written in English and Afrikaans. The memorial stands on a square granite base.

The design of the memorial is similar to that of the Diamond War Memorial erected in Derry, Northern Ireland in 1927, which was also designed by March.

== Location ==
The Cenotaph is located on the Heerengracht Street median at the street's intersection with Herzog Boulevard in Cape Town's city centre, on the city's main boulevard. It has been relocated twice to facilitate development of the city's transport infrastructure, in 1959 and 2013. It was first erected at the bottom of Adderley Street in 1924. In 1959 it was moved by 8 metres (26 ft) when Adderley Street was widened. In 2013 it was moved again by 300 metres (980 ft), from Adderley Street's central island at the intersection of Riebeek Street opposite the Cape Town railway station to the Heerengracht Street median on the same axis of the city, to make way for a new feeder station for the MyCiTi bus rapid transit system.

== See also ==
- Artillery Memorial, Cape Town
- Delville Wood South African National Memorial
