= Diamond War Memorial =

- Northern Ireland
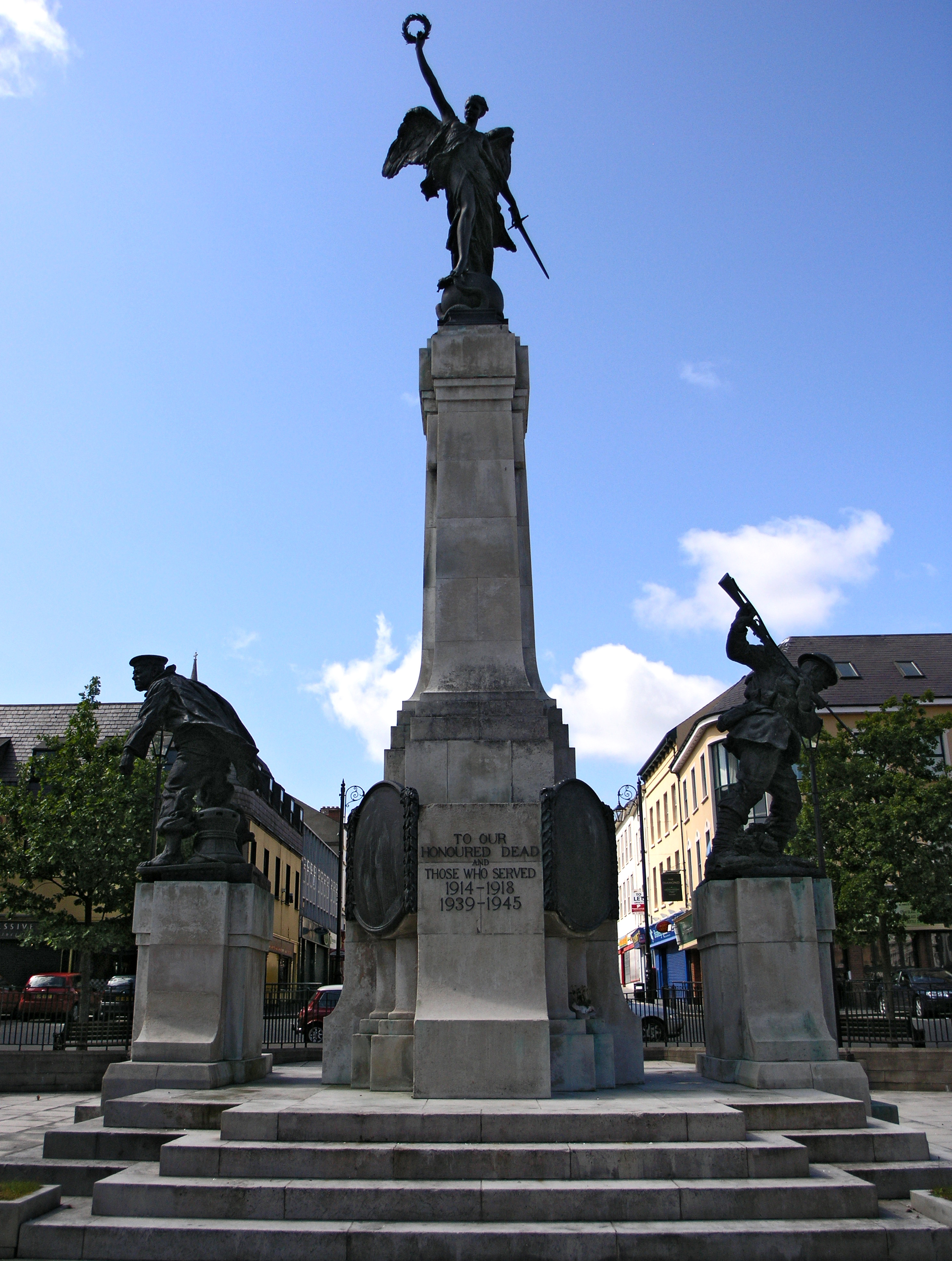
- For soldiers who died and served in World War I and World War II
- Unveiled: 23 June 1927
- Location: 54°59′44″N 7°19′19″W; Derry
- Designed by: Sydney March and Vernon March
- To our honoured dead and those who served 1914–1918; 1939–1945

Erected in 1927, the Diamond War Memorial is located on The Diamond in the centre of Derry, County Londonderry, Northern Ireland. It is dedicated to the citizens of the city who lost their lives while in military service during World War I and World War II.

== Planning ==
In early 1919, the public leaders of the city of Derry first considered initiating a fund to erect a memorial to the fallen of the Great War. The memorial would be composed of granite or bronze and would have the names of the deceased inscribed upon it. The City War Memorial Fund was established in February 1919. It required several years to obtain the necessary funding from charitable contributions. By the sixth anniversary of the 1918 Armistice, some Derry citizens became disgruntled by the slow progress. However, the following year, in April 1925, the design and location of the memorial were approved by the city's War Memorial Committee. However, they still faced the hurdle of obtaining consent from the Londonderry Corporation, which was obtained after some initial disagreement with regard to the proposed location of the monument.

== Design ==
The Diamond War Memorial was designed by siblings Sydney March and Vernon March. The brothers came from a large family that included eight children who became artists and established a studio at their family home of Goddendene in Farnborough, Kent, England. The monument was sculpted by one of the brothers, Vernon March, who, together with his siblings, was also responsible for monuments such as the National War Memorial of Ottawa. Vernon was considered to be a prodigy, with the distinction of being the youngest exhibitor in the Royal Academy of Arts, having been just 16 years old when his statue of Psyche was shown and purchased on the third day of the exhibition. Vernon March also sculpted miniatures of the Diamond War Memorial that are housed within Saint Columb's Cathedral in Derry. The Memorial is of bronze and Portland stone, a limestone mined from the quarries of the Isle of Portland, Dorset, England. The memorial has a height of almost forty feet and a width of twenty-seven feet. A centre monument, including a winged victory statue holding high a laurel wreath, has the names of the fallen engraved in raised letters on four sides. Near the base of the memorial, there are two smaller bronze monuments, a soldier on one side representing the Army and a sailor on the other side representing the Navy. The walled city of Derry, nicknamed the Maiden City, has four main gates, with roads that lead to a central Diamond, the heart of the city. The cenotaph is located in the centre of The Diamond.

The design of the memorial is similar to that of the Cenotaph erected in Cape Town, South Africa, in 1924, which was also designed by March.

== Dedication ==
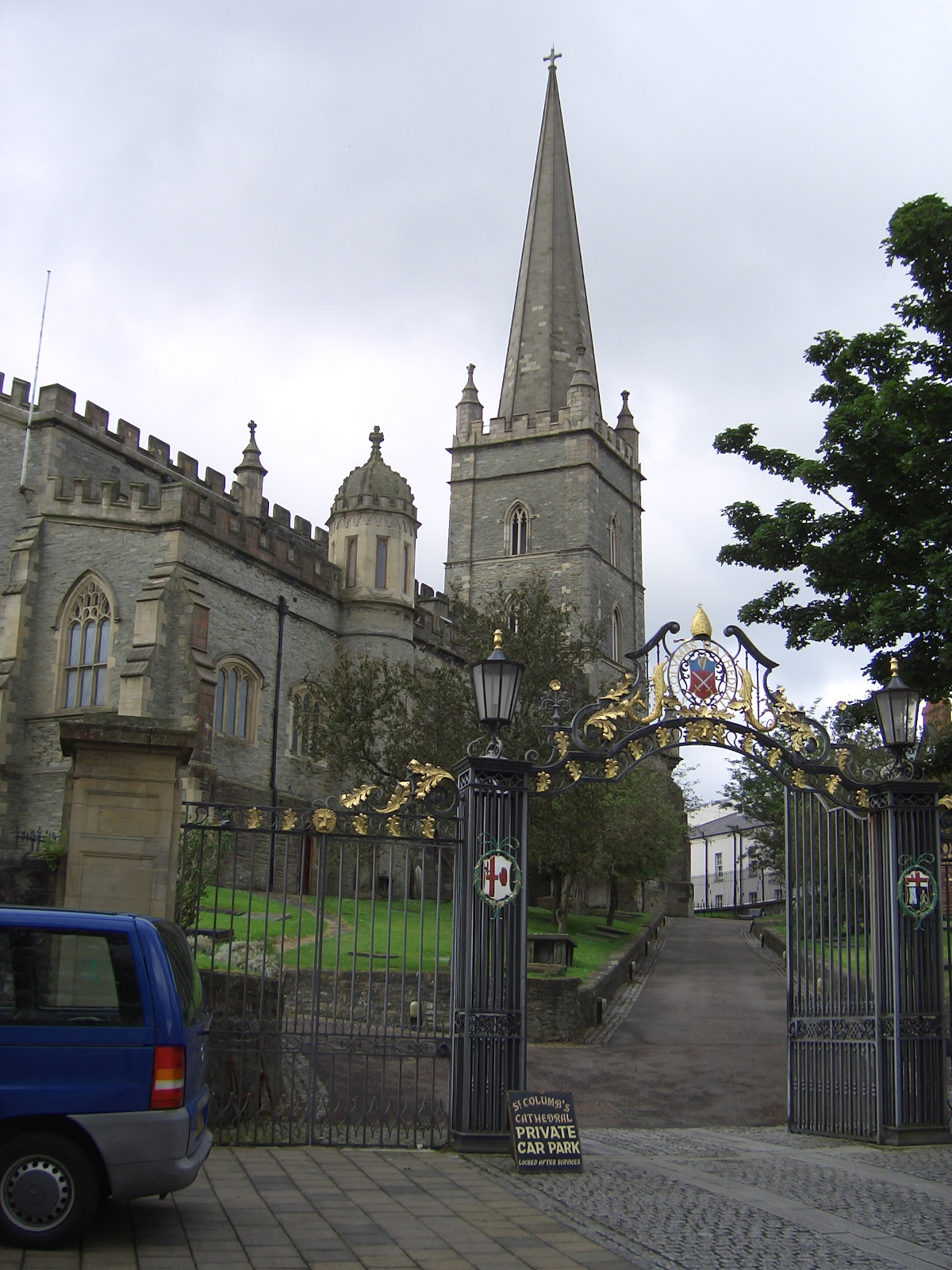
Saint Columb's Cathedral houses miniatures of the Diamond War Memorial.

The ceremonial unveiling of the Diamond War Memorial took place on 23 June 1927. Major-General F. F. Ready, General Officer Commanding the Northern Ireland district, performed the unveiling. Sir Robert Newton Anderson, chairman of the War Memorial Committee, as well as member of the Northern Ireland House of Commons and former mayor of the city, had been scheduled to preside over the ceremony, but illness prevented his attendance that day. There were places of honour for relatives, servicemen's associations, former regiments, the United Kingdom's forces, clergy, and representatives of public bodies. The British Legion served as honour guard, and the band of the 1st Battalion and a large choir also participated. After an initial music program, Major-General Ready, accompanied by the mayor and town clerk, proceeded to the memorial, where there was an inspection of the honour guard. Following singing of God of Our Fathers, Known of Old, originally written by Rudyard Kipling as the poem Recessional, Lady Anderson, acting on behalf of her husband, gave a short speech and then requested that the major-general proceed with the unveiling and dedication. Ready delivered a brief address and unveiled the memorial. After the dedication of the monument, a brief period of silence was observed, followed by the hymn The Supreme Sacrifice, also known as O Valiant Hearts, written by Sir John Stanhope Arkwright and composed by Rev. C. Harris. The buglers of the 1st battalion played The Last Post and Londonderry Air. Lady Anderson, representing her husband and the War Memorial Committee, handed over custody of the memorial to the mayor, who accepted on behalf of the Londonderry Corporation. Wreaths were also placed on the monument on behalf of the citizens, the Northern Ireland District, and the British Legion. After the national anthem, floral tributes were placed by representatives of relatives, former units, regimental associations, and public bodies. The dedication of the monument that was erected in honour of the 756 citizens of their city killed in World War I, as well as the 4,000 men and women who volunteered for duty, then concluded.

== Diamond War Memorial Project ==
The Holywell Trust, formed in 1988, is a charitable organisation based in the centre of the walled city of Derry. It has an aim of researching and promoting awareness in the North West of Ulster (County Londonderry, County Donegal, and County Tyrone) of World War I memorials, as well as the citizens who died in the war. The trust initiated the Diamond War Memorial Project on 12 February 2007. It entailed extensive research by historian Trevor Temple of the 756 names on the Diamond War Memorial. The project also led to the creation of a Commemorative Diary and a website which lists the names of those on the memorial and details their individual stories. The project research discovered an almost equal proportion of unionist and nationalist names, such that the Diamond War Memorial may be considered a shared monument by its citizens.
