= Harry Geoffrey Beasley =

British anthropologist and museum curator

Harry Geoffrey Beasley (18 December 1881 – 24 February 1939) was a British anthropologist and museum curator who developed an important ethnographic collection during the early 20th century that is now held in various British museums.

== Life ==
Beasley was born in 1881 in East Plumstead in Kent and developed an interest in ethnography at a young age. Beasley was privately wealthy after inheriting the North Kent Brewery and, in 1914, married his cousin Irene Marguerite Beasley. The same year, he became a Fellow of the Royal Anthropological Institute and was an active member until 1937, serving as vice-president between 1932 and 1937. With his wife, Beasley settled in Cranmore House in Chislehurst and there set up the Cranmore Ethnographical Museum which eventually held more than 6,000 objects of ethnographical interest. The Beasley's collected objects from across Europe, buying from auction houses and local museums to expand the collection, which contained material from the Pacific, Asia, Africa, and Northwestern America. Beasley wrote numerous articles for anthropological journals and was considered an expert in his field. He died from diabetes in 1939 and his collection was stored with the British Museum collections during the war, which was fortunate as the Cranmore Museum was destroyed by bombing. After the war substantial portions of the collection were passed to the British Museum, the Royal Museum in Edinburgh, the Museum of Archaeology and Anthropology, University of Cambridge, the Pitt Rivers Museum and the Merseyside County Museum. Other pieces were sold by his widow and, after her death in 1974, by their daughters.
