= List of World War I monuments and memorials =

This is a list of World War I monuments and memorials.

There are numerous World War I monuments and memorials in various countries.

== Australia ==
in Queensland

- Anzac Avenue Memorial Trees
- Anzac Memorial Park, Townsville
- Apple Tree Creek War Memorial
- Aramac War Memorial
- Atherton War Memorial
- Barcaldine War Memorial Clock
- Beaudesert War Memorial
- Boonah War Memorial
- Booval War Memorial
- Brooweena War Memorial
- Bulimba Memorial Park
- Bundaberg War Memorial
- Cairns War Memorial
- Cardwell Divisional Board Hall
- Charleville War Memorial
- Chinchilla Digger Statue
- Coorparoo School of Arts and RSL Memorial Hall
- Cooyar War Memorial
- Cunnamulla War Memorial Fountain
- Dalby War Memorial and Gates
- Esk War Memorial
- Eumundi War Memorial Trees
- Evelyn Scrub War Memorial
- Finch Hatton War Memorial
- First World War Honour Board, Lands Administration Building
- First World War Honour Board, National Australia Bank (308 Queen Street)
- Forest Hill War Memorial
- Gair Park
- Gayndah War Memorial
- Goombungee War Memorial
- Goomeri Hall of Memory
- Goomeri War Memorial Clock
- Goondiwindi War Memorial
- Greenmount War Memorial
- Gympie and Widgee War Memorial Gates
- Gympie Memorial Park
- Herberton War Memorial
- Howard War Memorial
- Ipswich Railway Workshops War Memorial
- Isis District War Memorial and Shire Council Chambers
- Ithaca War Memorial
- Linville War Memorial
- Lt Thomas Armstrong Memorial
- Ma Ma Creek War Memorial
- Manly War Memorial
- Maroon War Memorial
- Miriam Vale War Memorial
- Mitchell War Memorial
- Montville Memorial Precinct
- Mowbray Park and East Brisbane War Memorial
- Our Lady of Victories Catholic Church
- Oxley War Memorial
- Pimpama & Ormeau War Memorial
- Pinkenba War Memorial
- Rockhampton War Memorial
- Roma War Memorial and Heroes Avenue
- Sandgate War Memorial Park
- Sarina War Memorial
- Shrine of Remembrance, Brisbane
- Sir William Glasgow Memorial
- Soldiers Memorial Hall, Toowoomba
- St Andrew's Presbyterian Memorial Church, Innisfail
- Stanthorpe Soldiers Memorial
- Strathpine Honour Board
- Temple of Peace (Toowong Cemetery)
- Tieri War Memorial
- Toogoolawah War Memorial
- Toowong Memorial Park
- Townsville West State School
- Traveston Powder Magazine
- Victor Denton War Memorial
- War Memorial Bridge, Brooweena
- Warwick War Memorial
- Weeping Mother Memorial
- Westbrook War Memorial
- Windsor War Memorial Park
- Woody Point Memorial Hall
- World War I Cenotaph, Mackay
- World War I memorials in Queensland
- Yeppoon War Memorial
- Yeronga Memorial Park

besides in Queensland

- Anzac Cottage
- Anzac Parade, Canberra
- ANZAC War Memorial
- Australian War Memorial
- Blackboy Hill, Western Australia
- Fremantle War Memorial
- Hobart Cenotaph
- Johnstone Park
- Kahibah Public School
- Kemal Atatürk Memorial, Canberra
- King George V Memorial
- Mounted Memorial, Canberra
- National War Memorial (South Australia)
- Shrine of Remembrance
- Sydney Cenotaph

== Belgium ==
- Interallied Memorial of Cointe, Liège

== Canada ==
- The Fighting Newfoundlander
- Fredericton Cenotaph
- National War Memorial (Canada)
- National War Memorial (Newfoundland)
- Peace Tower
- Saint John War Memorial
- Tomb of the Unknown Soldier (Canada)

== France ==
- List of World War I memorials and cemeteries in the Argonne
- List of World War I memorials and cemeteries in Artois
- List of World War I memorials and cemeteries in Champagne-Ardennes
- List of World War I memorials and cemeteries in Flanders
- List of World War I Memorials and Cemeteries in Lorraine
- List of World War I memorials and cemeteries in the area of the St Mihiel salient
- List of World War I memorials and cemeteries in the Somme
- List of World War I memorials and cemeteries in Verdun

== Germany ==
- Kriegerdenkmal im Hofgarten (Munich)
- Laboe Naval Memorial
- Möltenort U-Boat Memorial
- Neue Wache
- Tannenberg Memorial (Demolished)

== India ==
- War Memorial, Kapurthala

== Poland ==
- Monument to the Military Endeavour of Polish Americans
- World War I Memorial in Bytom-Bobrek

== Portugal ==
- Monument to the Fallen of the Great War (Lisbon)

== Romania ==
- Mausoleum of Mărășești
- Heroes' Cross on Caraiman Peak
- Arcul de Triumf, Bucharest
- Tomb of the Unknown Soldier, Bucharest
- Mausoleum of Mateiaș, Argeș County

== Russia ==
- Monument to Heroes of World War I (Azov)
- Monument to heroes of World War I (Rostov-on-Don)

Монумент героям Первой мировой войны (село Частоостровское Красноярский край) https://kras-yar.livejournal.com/53397.html

- Monument to the Ingush Cavalry Regiment of the "Wild Division" [[[:[ru]:Monument to the Ingush Cavalry Regiment of the "Wild Division"|[ru]]]]

== Serbia ==
- Monument and Memorial Ossuary to the Defenders of Belgrade

== Turkey ==
- List of war cemeteries and memorials on the Gallipoli Peninsula
- 57th Infantry Regiment Memorial
- Arıburnu Memorial
- Chunuk Bair Mehmetçik Memorials
- Çanakkale Martyrs' Memorial
- Gallipoli Newfoundland Memorial
- Helles Memorial
- Iğdır Genocide Memorial and Museum
- Lone Pine Memorial
- Respect to Mehmetçik Monument
- Stop Passenger! Monument
- Tarihe Saygı Anıtı

== United Kingdom ==
in England

- 24th East Surrey Division War Memorial
- 29th Division War Memorial
- Abinger Common War Memorial
- African and Caribbean War Memorial
- Andover War Memorial Hospital
- Anglo-Belgian Memorial, London
- Arch of Remembrance
- Ashwell War Memorial
- Australian War Memorial, London
- Baltic Exchange Memorial Glass
- Barrow Park Cenotaph
- Birkenhead War Memorial
- Blackburn War Memorial
- Blackmoor War Memorial
- Bootle War Memorial
- Bournemouth War Memorial
- Bradford War Memorial
- Bridgwater War Memorial
- Bristol Cenotaph
- British Thomson-Houston Company War Memorial
- Bromley Parish Church Memorial
- Bromley War Memorial
- Brookwood American Cemetery and Memorial
- Busbridge War Memorial
- Cambridge War Memorial
- Canada Memorial
- Carnforth War Memorial
- Cavalry of the Empire Memorial
- Cavell Van
- The Cenotaph, Whitehall
- Chatham Naval Memorial
- Chattri, Brighton
- Chester War Memorial
- Chingford War Memorial
- Chipping Barnet War Memorial
- Christ Church War Memorial Garden
- Civil Service Rifles War Memorial
- Cockfosters War Memorial
- County War Memorial, Nottingham
- Crewe War Memorial
- Croydon Cenotaph
- Derby War Memorial
- Devon County War Memorial
- Dover Marine War Memorial
- Dover Patrol Monument
- Dulwich College War Memorial
- Dulwich Old College War Memorial
- Ealing War Memorial
- East Barnet War Memorial
- Edith Cavell Memorial
- Equestrian statue of Edward Horner
- Equestrian statue of Ferdinand Foch, London
- Exeter War Memorial
- Finchley War Memorial
- Flanders Fields Memorial Garden
- Fordham War Memorial
- Fovant Badges
- Friern Barnet Parishioners War Memorial
- Fulham War Memorial
- Gerrards Cross Memorial Building
- Gleadless War Memorial
- Golders Green War Memorial
- Great Eastern Railway War Memorial
- Great Missenden War Memorial
- Great Western Railway War Memorial
- Guards Memorial
- Earl Haig Memorial
- Hall of Memory, Birmingham
- Hampstead War Memorial
- Hampton Wick War Memorial
- Hartburn War Memorial
- Harrogate War Memorial
- Hatfield War Memorial
- Helsby War Memorial
- Hendon War Memorial
- Holme Valley war memorial
- Holy Island War Memorial
- Hornsey War Memorial
- Hove War Memorial
- Hoylake and West Kirby War Memorial
- Imperial Camel Corps Memorial
- Inns of Court War Memorial
- Islington Green War Memorial
- King's Somborne War Memorial
- Lancashire Fusiliers War Memorial
- Lancaster Gate Memorial Cross
- Leeds Rifles War Memorial
- Lewes War Memorial
- Liverpool Cenotaph
- Livesey Hall War Memorial
- London and North Western Railway War Memorial
- London Troops War Memorial
- London, Brighton and South Coast Railway War Memorial
- Loughborough Carillon
- Lower Swell War Memorial
- Macclesfield War Memorial
- Machine Gun Corps Memorial
- Malvern Wells War Memorial
- Manchester Cenotaph
- Mells War Memorial
- Memorial Gates, London
- Midland Railway War Memorial
- Miserden War Memorial
- Monken Hadley War Memorial
- Morecambe and Heysham War Memorial
- Morley War Memorial, Scatcherd Park
- Moulton War Memorial
- Muncaster War Memorial
- Municipal Gardens, Aldershot
- National Submarine War Memorial
- New Barnet War Memorial
- New Zealand War Memorial, London
- Nicholson War Memorial
- North Eastern Railway War Memorial
- North London Railway war memorial
- Northampton War Memorial
- Northumberland Fusiliers Memorial
- Norwich War Memorial
- Old Eldon Square War Memorial, Newcastle
- Oldham War Memorial
- Oxfordshire and Buckinghamshire Light Infantry War Memorial
- Parliamentary War Memorial
- Polish Forces War Memorial:National Memorial Arboretum
- Port Sunlight War Memorial
- Port Talbot War Memorial
- Portland Cenotaph
- Portuguese Fireplace
- Potters Bar war memorial
- Preston Cenotaph
- Queen's Own Royal West Kent Regiment Cenotaph
- Quintin and Alice Hogg Memorial
- Radnor Gardens War Memorial
- Rainham War Memorial
- Redheugh Gardens War Memorial
- Richmond War Memorial, London
- Rifle Brigade War Memorial
- Rochdale Cenotaph
- Rolvenden War Memorial
- Royal Air Force Memorial
- Royal Artillery Memorial
- Royal Berkshire Regiment War Memorial
- Royal Fusiliers War Memorial
- Royal Naval Division War Memorial
- Runcorn War Memorial
- St Michael Cornhill War Memorial
- Sandhurst War Memorial
- Sheffield War Memorial
- Shot at Dawn Memorial
- Silvertown War Memorial
- The Cenotaph, Southampton
- Southend-on-Sea War Memorial
- Southport War Memorial
- Southwark War Memorial
- Spalding War Memorial
- St Thomas' Peace Garden
- Statue of the Earl Kitchener, London
- Stockbridge War Memorial
- Streatham War Memorial
- Sutton War Memorial, London
- Teddington Memorial Hospital
- Todmorden War Memorial
- Tower Hill Memorial
- Trumpington War Memorial
- University of Reading War Memorial
- The Unknown Warrior
- Verdun tree
- Wagoners' Memorial
- War Memorial Cross, Beeston
- War Memorial Park, Coventry
- War Memorial Shelters
- Wargrave War Memorial
- West Hartlepool War Memorial
- Westerley Ware
- Westfield War Memorial Village
- Whipsnade Tree Cathedral
- Widnes War Memorial
- Winchester College War Cloister
- Women of Steel
- Wood Green War Memorial
- Wyke Regis War Memorial
- York and Lancaster Memorial, Sheffield
- York City War Memorial

in Northern Ireland

- Diamond War Memorial

in Scotland

- Cameronians War Memorial
- Kilmarnock War Memorial
- Glasgow War Memorial
- Scottish American Memorial
- Scottish National War Memorial

in Wales

- Monmouth War Memorial
- Montgomeryshire County War Memorial
- War Memorial of the Royal Monmouthshire Royal Engineers
- Welch Regiment War Memorial

== United States ==
- American Doughboy Bringing Home Victory
- Argonne Cross Memorial
- List of memorials and monuments at Arlington National Cemetery
- Camp Merritt Memorial Monument
- Carmel-by-the-Sea World War I Memorial Arch
- Century Tower (University of Florida)
- City Employees War Memorial
- The Dalles Civic Auditorium
- District of Columbia War Memorial
- Dover Patrol Monument
- Elks National Veterans Memorial
- Equestrian statue of Joan of Arc (Portland, Oregon)
- Indiana World War Memorial Plaza
- International World War Peace Tree
- Littlefield Fountain
- McLaughlin Hall (Detroit, Michigan)
- Memorial Arch (Huntington, West Virginia)
- Memorial Gymnasium (University of Idaho)
- Memorial Hall (Kansas City, Kansas)
- Memorial Hall (Newark, Delaware)
- Memorial Hall (University of Kentucky)
- Memorial Park, Houston
- Mojave Memorial Cross
- National World War I Memorial (Washington, D.C.)
- National World War I Museum and Memorial
- Navy – Merchant Marine Memorial
- Newton City Hall and War Memorial
- Over the Top to Victory
- Paragould War Memorial
- Peace Cross
- Rosedale World War I Memorial Arch
- Sierra Madre Memorial Park
- Soldiers and McKinley Memorial Parkways
- Soldiers Memorial Military Museum
- Spirit of the American Doughboy
- Spirit of the American Navy
- Tomb of the Known Soldier
- Tomb of the Unknown Soldier (Arlington)
- Victory Boulevard (Staten Island)
- Victory Eagle
- Virginia War Memorial
- Waikiki Natatorium War Memorial
- Washington Avenue Soldier's Monument and Triangle
- Winged Victory (Lewis)
- World War I Memorial (Atlantic City, New Jersey)
- World War I Memorial (East Providence, Rhode Island)
- World War I Memorial (Elkton, Maryland)
- World War I Memorial (Norfolk, Connecticut)
- World War I Memorial (Salem, Oregon)
- World War I Memorial Flagpole (Hawkins)
- World War Memorial (Kimball, West Virginia)
- Young Memorial
