= Green Memorial =

Green Memorial or Greene Memorial may refer to the following:

== Buildings and structures ==
- Golders Green War Memorial in Golders Green, North London, UK
- Green Memorial A.M.E. Zion Church in Portland, Maine
- Green Memorial Hospital in Manipay, Sri Lanka
- Islington Green War Memorial in Islington, London, UK
- Kettering Health Greene Memorial Hospital in Xenia, Ohio
- Thomas A. Greene Memorial Museum in Milwaukee, Wisconsin
- Wood Green War Memorial in Haringey, London, UK

== Organizations ==
- Philip Green Memorial Trust
