= Finchley War Memorial =

War memorial in London

Coordinates: 51.612398°N 0.177977°W

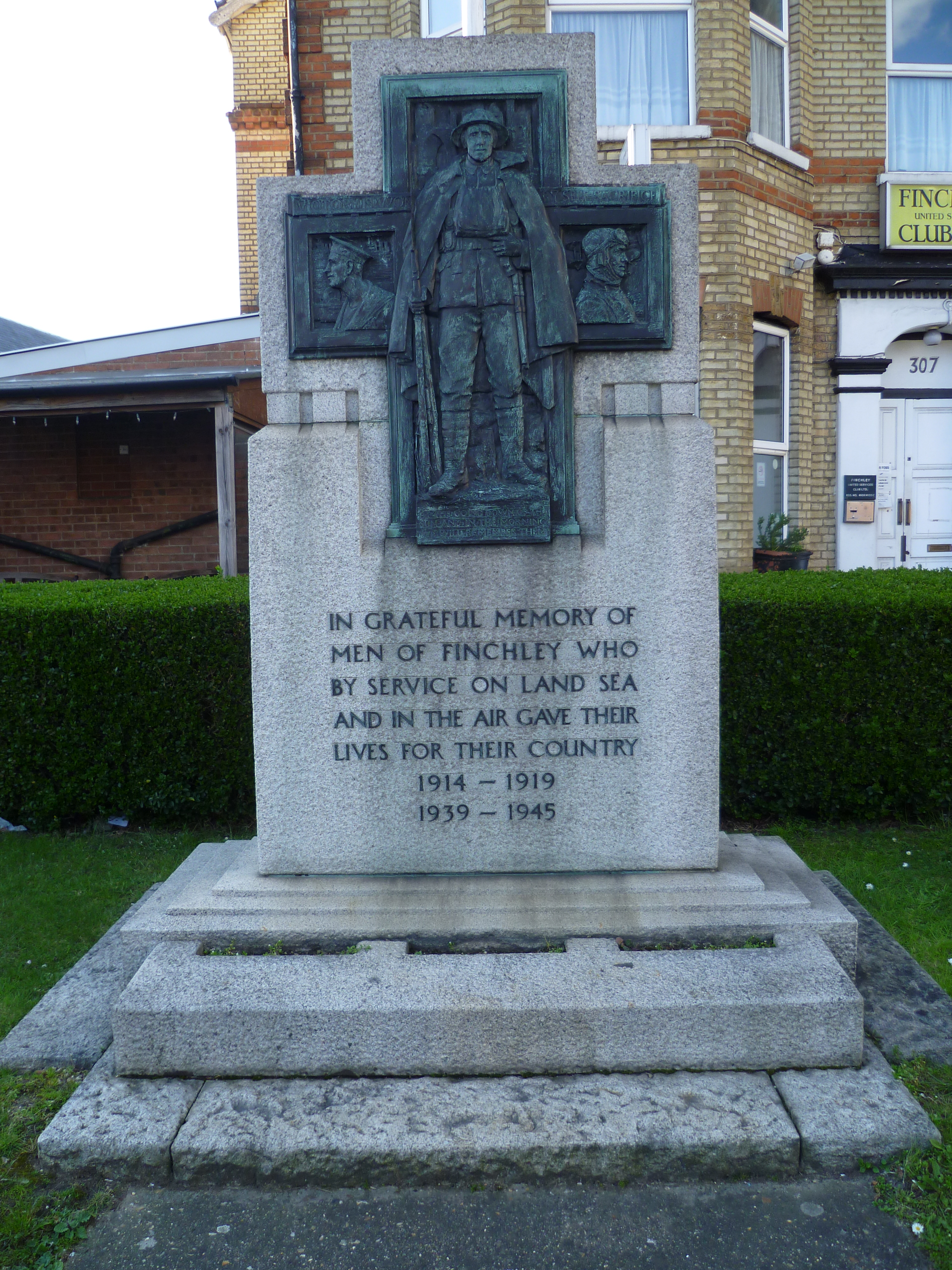
Finchley War Memorial

Finchley War Memorial (IWM Ref:10972) is located in Ballards Lane, North Finchley, outside the United Services Club. It was unveiled by Viscount Lascelles on 13 November 1925, an event that was attended by thousands of people. The memorial is dedicated to 1,000 servicemen and women from Finchley who died in World War I. After the ceremony, dignitaries addressed a tightly packed gathering in the St Kilda Hall. Finchley sent over five thousand men to the Colours. Finchley United Services Club.

== Appearance ==
The large granite cross at Finchley War Memorial is inside a maintained fenced enclosure, the gates have the words St Kildas on them named after the Scottish archipelago, St Kilda. The bronze sculptured panel contains a carved relief with the figures of three servicemen: a soldier in full trench kit, with a steel helmet, cape and fixed bayonet flanked by the busts of a sailor and an airman.

There is an inscription on the top which reads above the soldier, which says "Victory won by Sacrifice" and below the soldier "At the Going down of the Sun and in the Morning we will Remember them." There is a flagpole behind the stone cross. (OS Grid Ref: TQ 261 921) On either side of the memorial, there are two memorial plaques: the Finchley Metropolitan Tramway War Memorial (IWM Ref 64400) and the Hendon Garage War Memorial (IWM Ref 64399) that were relocated, after the buildings where they were hanging were demolished.

                                          In grateful Memory of 
                                           Men of Finchley who
                                          By service on Land Sea
                                         And in the Air gave their
                                          Lives for their Country.
                                                1914 - 1919 
                                                1939 – 1945

No names are inscribed on the main memorial.

== History ==
The memorial remembers those servicemen and women up to the present day who have died in conflict and also their loved ones, family and friends who they left behind. A service of remembrance occurs every year on Remembrance Sunday at the memorial with a two minute long silence and the Last Post sounds followed by a March Past. Ballards Lane is closed at this time so that relatives and members of the community can pay their respects. Recorded IWM Ref: 10972. Barnet Press 4 February 1922 Finchley Branch of the British Legion has acquired 'St Kilda' in Ballards Lane as a club. Martin Coyle.

The memorial was Grade II listed by Historic England in April 2019.

A separate and original memorial in the form of a bronze plaque is located at Finchley Memorial Hospital. It commemorates the local men who died during World War I.
