= Dulwich Old College War Memorial =

War memorial in London

Coordinates: 51°26′48″N 0°05′09″W

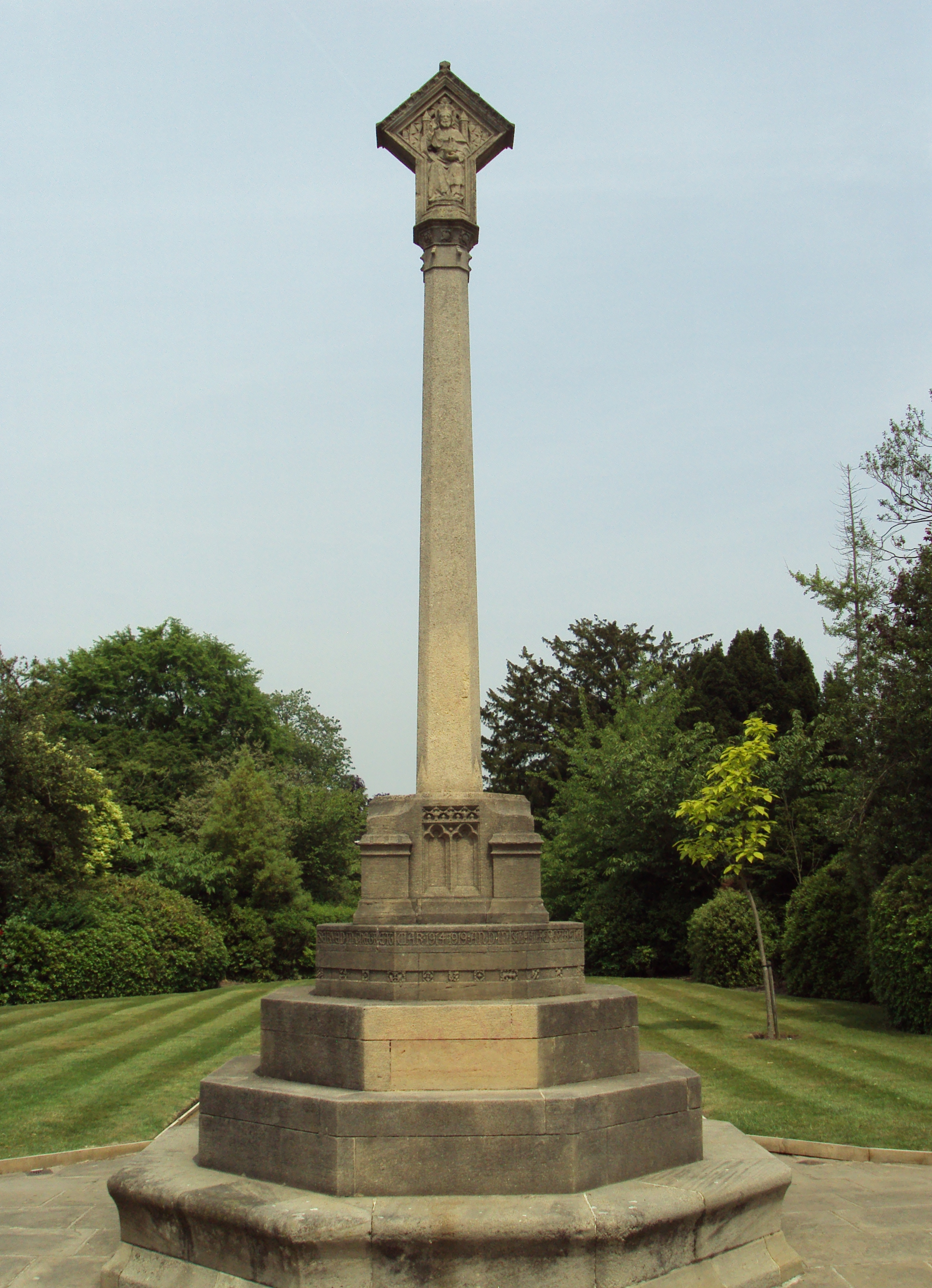
Dulwich Old College War Memorial in 2010

The Dulwich Old College War Memorial is located in the forecourt of Dulwich Old College on College Road in Dulwich in the London Borough of Southwark. It marks the deaths of the former pupils of the college who died in the First World War between 1914 and 1919. The memorial is made from Hopton Wood Stone and was designed by William Douglas Caröe. It was unveiled in 1921. It has been grade II listed on the National Heritage List for England since May 2010. The heritage listing places the memorial within a "visual and contextual relationship" with the Grade II listed Old College building and the entrance gates and piers of the Old College, also Grade II listed.

== Description ==
The memorial is in the form of a tall tapering shaft of Hopton Wood Stone, topped by a diamond entablature which bears carved images of Christ the King to the north and south sides.

The shaft stands on a square pedestal, with its north face decorated with the shield of Dulwich College with the college motto DETUR GLORIA/ SOLI DEO ("Let glory be given to God alone") inscribed above, and the south face has a panel with a design of a double trefoil-headed window.

The pedestal stands on a four tiered octagonal plinth. The top tier is decorated with floral motifs and encircled by an inscription in raised letters:

IN HONOUR OF THE MEN/ OF THIS FOUNDATION WHO/ SERVED IN THE GREAT/ WAR 1914–1919 AND IN/ SOLEMN REMEMBRANCE/ OF THOSE WHO DIED FOR/ LIBERTY AND JUSTICE TO/ THE GLORY OF GOD.

Oak panels on the south wall of Christ's Chapel in the Old College building record the names of the dead.

== See also ==
- Dulwich College War Memorial
