= Carmel-by-the-Sea World War I Memorial Arch =

War memorial in Carmel-by-the-Sea

Carmel World War I Memorial Arch
- United States
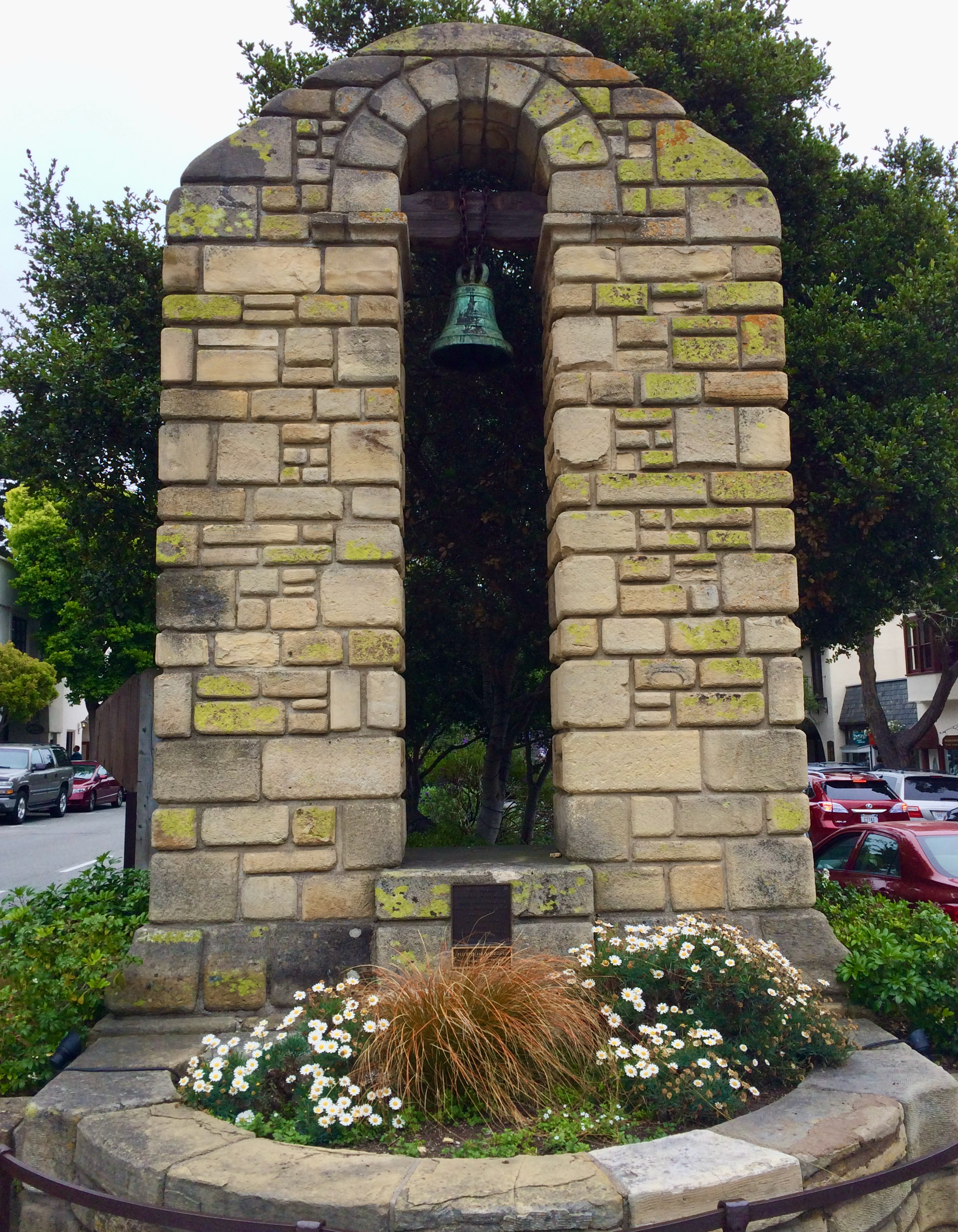
- Carmel World War I Memorial Arch
- For Servicemen from Monterey peninsula killed in the First World War
- Unveiled: 10 November 1921
- Location: 36°33′19″N 121°55′24″W; Intersection of Ocean Avenue and San Carlos Street near Carmel-by-the-Sea, California
- Designed by: Charles Sumner Greene
- This Memorial; Is Dedicated To The men Of; Carmel Who Responded to Their Country's Call During; World War I We salute them Carmel American Legion; Post 512; 1984

The Carmel-by-the-Sea World War I Memorial Arch is a World War I memorial designed in 1919 by architect Charles Sumner Greene and located at Ocean Avenue and San Carlos Street center median divider in Carmel-by-the-Sea, California. The Memorial Arch was designated as a significant monument in the city's Downtown Historic District Property Survey, The Memorial Arch was recorded with the Department of Parks and Recreation on November 16, 2001. The Memorial Arch has been a historic landmark since November 1921, when it was built for Carmel World War I veterans. The Spanish Mission Revival style arch is constructed of Carmel sandstone.

== History ==
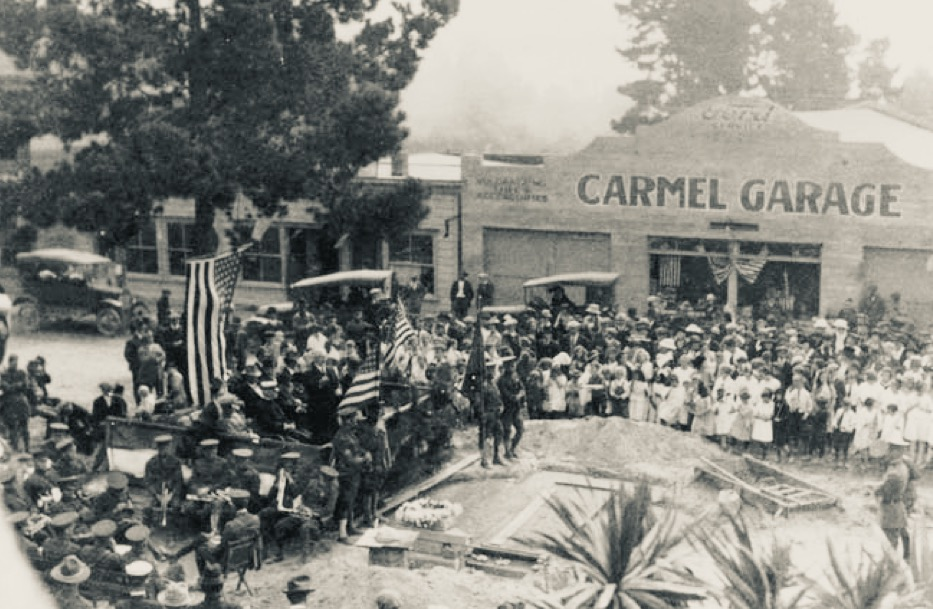
On Armistice Day, November 11, 1921, a crowd gathered for the laying of the cornerstone of the Soldiers Memorial Arch.

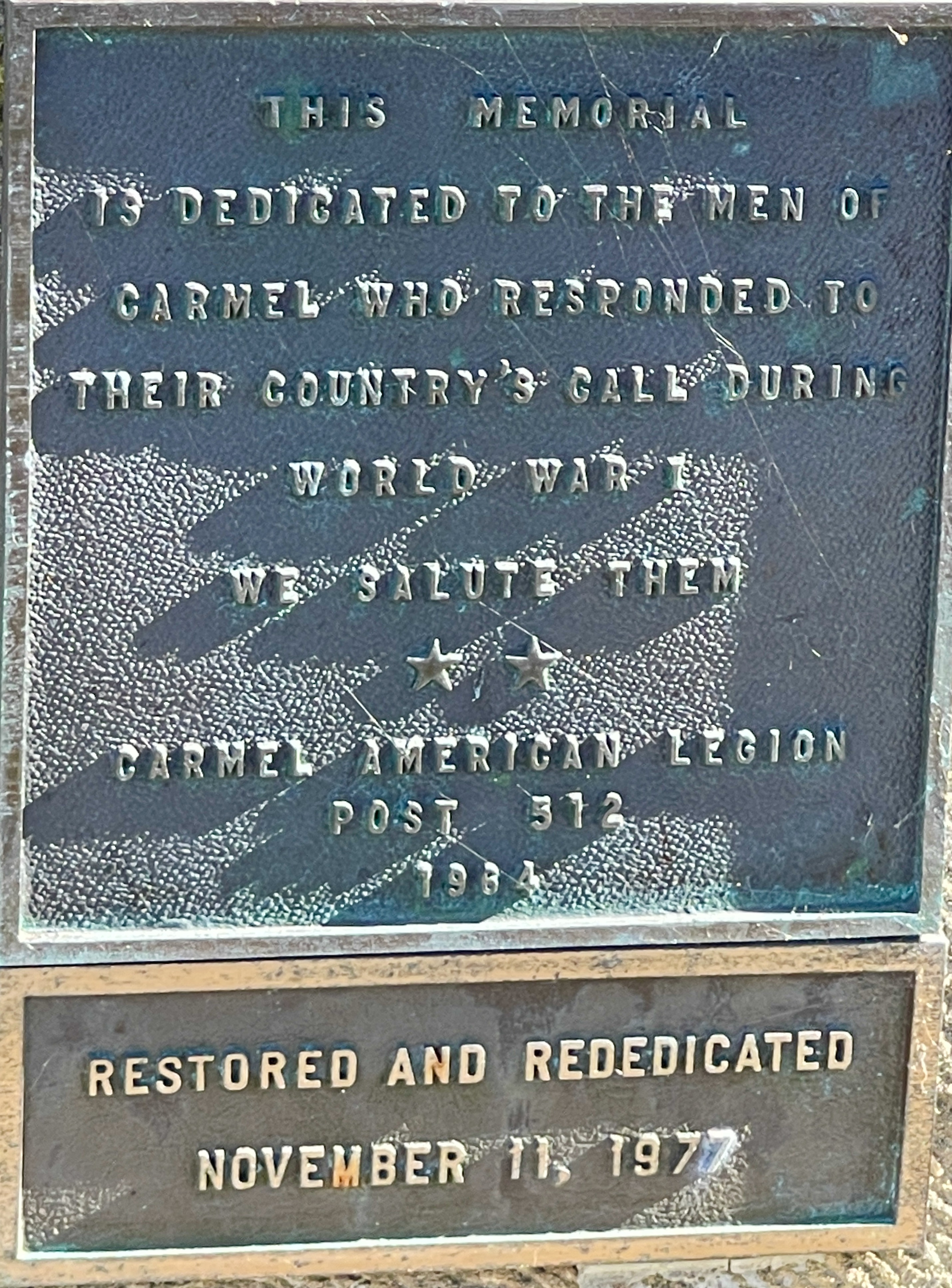
World War I Memorial Arch plaque.

The design generally resembles a bell tower of a California mission. Joseph McEldowney was a quarryman who helped source the stone for the memorial.

The cornerstone was laid on November 11, 1921, by Colonel John Jenkins of the 11th Cavalry Regiment from the Presidio of Monterey and retired Navy Commander John P. Pryor of the Monterey Peninsula American Legion at the first National Armistice Day celebration in Carmel. The city hosted a parade down Ocean Avenue, and the 11th Cavalry Band supplied the music. The arch was dedicated to “Those Who Served” in the First World War. Rev. Fred Sheldon of the Carmel Church and attorney J. H. Andresen spoke at the proceedings at the intersection of Ocean Avenue and San Carlos Street to a reviewing stand of local political and military dignitaries.

For forty-four years the arch did not contain a bell. Harry J. Downie (1903–1980) donated the first Spanish-style bell, believed to date back to 1692, which was added to the memorial in 1966 to mark the city's 50th anniversary.

After a new bronze bell was installed in 2016, the old bell is stored at the Carmel library's Henry Meade Williams Local History Room.

On October 6, 2017, the U.S. United States World War I Centennial Commission chose the arch as one of 100 memorials across the country to receive a matching $2,000 grant for restoration work in anticipation of the 100th anniversary of the end of World War I.

Every Memorial Day and Veterans Day, an American Legion Post 512 member rings the commemorative bell at 11:00 a.m., at Ocean and San Carlos followed by an open house at Post 512 on Delores.

The Memorial Arch is significant under California Register criteria in history as a community's expression of respect for 56 Carmelites who served their county in World War I. It is also significant in the area of architecture as the work of architect, Charles Sumner Greene.

== See also ==
- World War I memorials
- List of World War I monuments and memorials
