= Streatham War Memorial =

War memorial in London

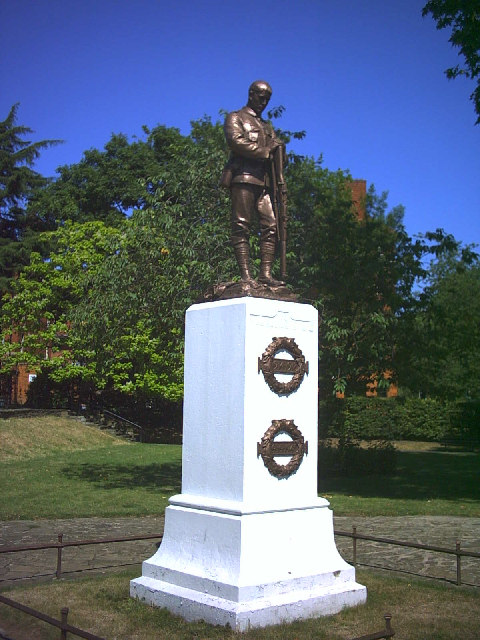
Streatham War Memorial

Streatham War Memorial is a war memorial to the war dead of the London district of Streatham in the two World Wars. It was unveiled in 1922, and is sited near the northwest corner of Streatham Common, London Borough of Lambeth, England.

== History ==
A Streatham War Memorial General Council was established in 1919 with plans to build a large Hall of Remembrance in Streatham to commemorate the 720 servicemen from the district killed during the First World War. The memorial council bought land on the Chimes estate near Streatham Common, but a lack of funding meant the ambitious scheme was not implemented. Instead, the plan was changed so that the Chimes building would become a servicemen's club, with a memorial garden and war memorial. Limited funding also prevented this plan from being realised, and the building was sold to the United Services Club in 1922, other land was sold to London County Council, and the proceeds were used to build the war memorial. The selected designer was Albert Toft.

The memorial was unveiled on 14 October 1922 by General Sir Charles Monro, 1st Baronet, with a dedication by the Anglican Bishop of Southwark, Cyril Garbett. The ceremony was attended by a crowd of 6,000 people. The war dead were listed on the Roll of Honour held at Streatham Library, but the document has been lost.

The nearby club building was damaged by a V1 flying bomb in July 1944 and demolished. The grounds became a housing estate, with the memorial confined to a small garden. The memorial was extended to commemorate the war dead of the Second World War, and it was re-dedicated on 8 May 1959 by the Mayor of Wandsworth, Councillor Ronald Ash. The war memorial garden was transferred to Lambeth Council in 1971. It was Grade II listed in December 2016.

== Design ==
The memorial comprises a square column of white stone on a tapering base, topped by a life-size bronze statue of a soldier. The soldier stands in service dress with his head uncovered and bowed, with his hands resting on a reversed rifle resting on his left boot. At his feet lie an army jacket, a steel helmet and a gas mask. The sculpture was based on Toft's Boer War memorial in Ipswich, and he included identical statues in the First World War memorials he designed for Stone, Staffordshire, Leamington, Warwickshire and Thornton-Cleveleys, Lancashire.

The plinth bears the inscription "TO / OUR GLORIOUS DEAD" and two bronze wreaths resembling Transport for London roundels, the top one inscribed "1914–1918" and the bottom one inscribed "1939–1945". A bronze plaque added in 2010 reads: "IN HONOUR OF / THE MEN AND WOMEN OF STREATHAM / WHO GAVE THEIR LIVES IN THE SERVICE / OF THEIR COUNTRY IN TWO WORLD WARS / 1914–1918 AND 1939–1945 / AND IN OTHER CONFLICTS / At the going down of the sun and in the morning / we will remember them / FROM THE PEOPLE OF STREATHAM 2010" (quoting lines from Laurence Binyon's "Ode of Remembrance").

The memorial stands on a square of grass surrounded by iron railings and a paved area. Plaques set into the paving in front of the memorial commemorate the award of the Victoria Cross to three men from the district: Frederick Henry Johnson, Geoffrey Cather and Alfred Fleming-Sandes.

A civilian war memorial is also located in the memorial gardens. The memorial is a contemporary sculpture by Ekkehard Altenburger erected in 2006 which takes the form of a plain stone obelisk carved from Irish blue limestone from Kilkenny on a plinth of the same material inscribed with a quotation from a poem by Rohit Sapra: "Grief has no boundaries". This memorial commemorates all people from Streatham affected by conflict or war.

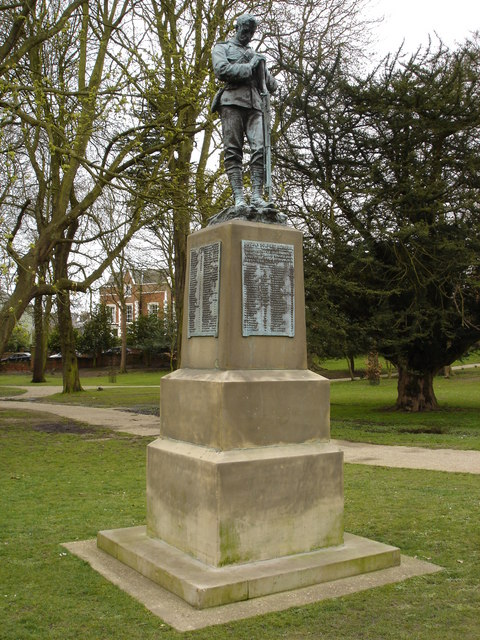
Suffolk Soldiers Boer War memorial, Ipswich

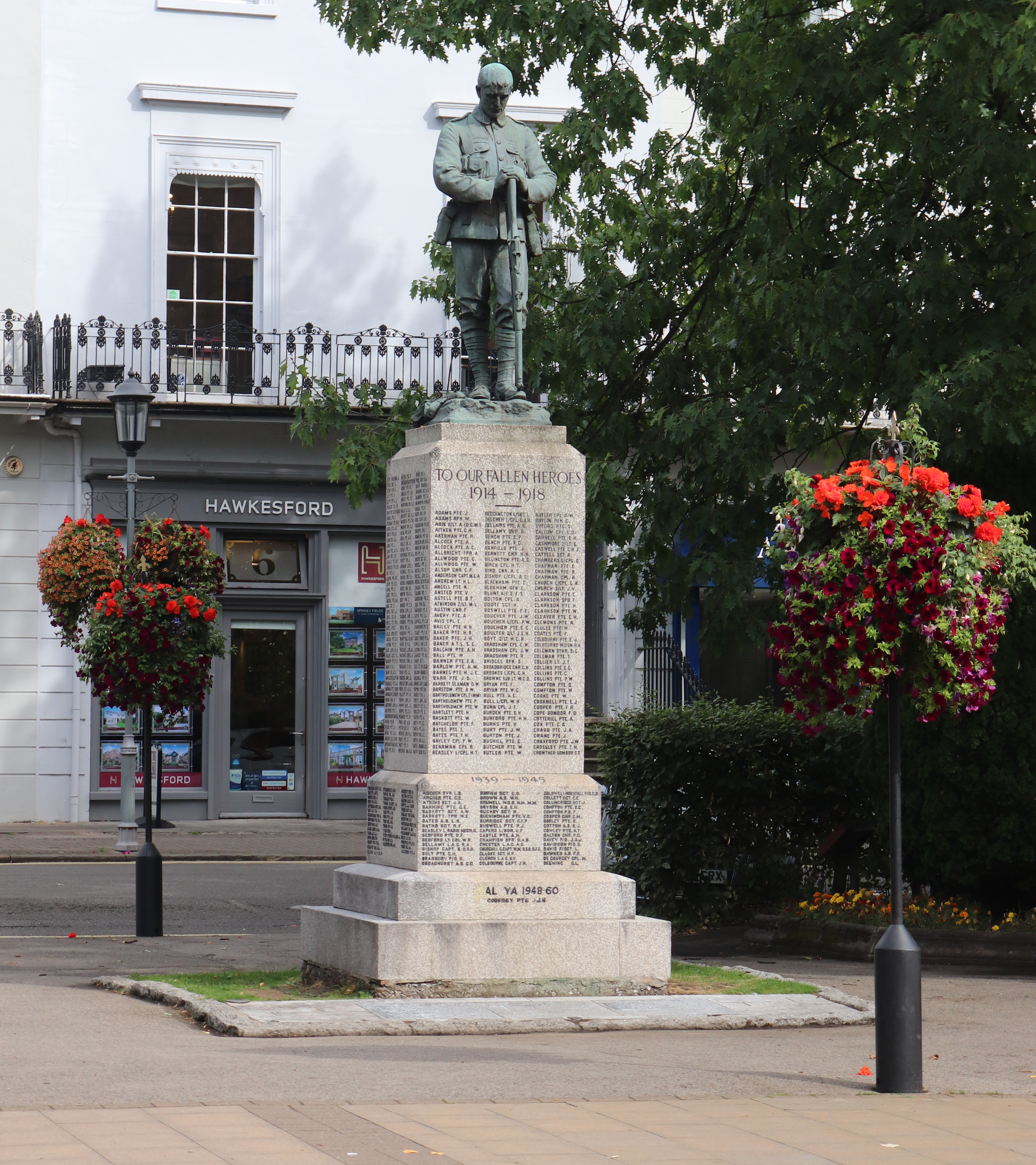
Leamington War Memorial

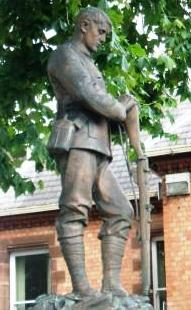
Stone War Memorial

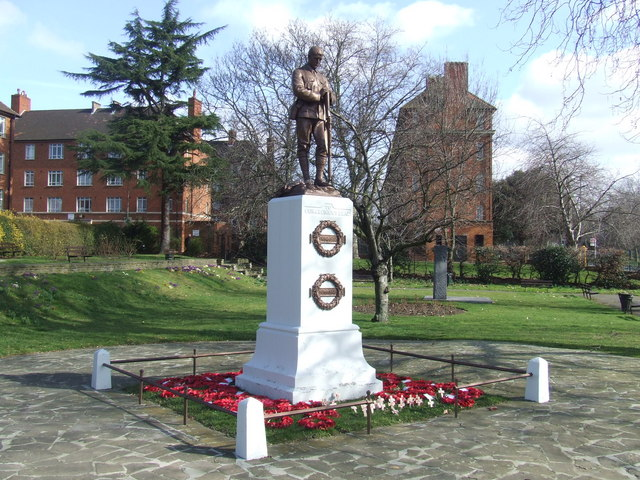
Streatham War Memorial
