= Malvern Wells War Memorial =

War memorial in Malvern Wells, Worcestershire, England

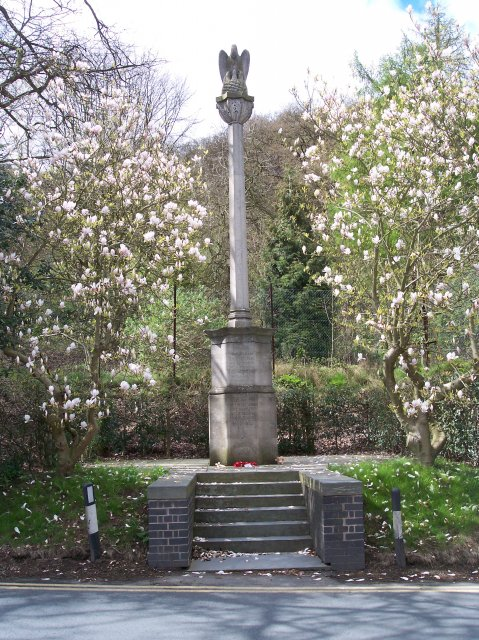
The memorial in April 2005.

The Malvern Wells War Memorial is located on Wells Road in the village of Malvern Wells near Great Malvern in Worcestershire. The memorial marks the deaths of local individuals who died fighting in World War I and World War II. It was dedicated in June 1920 by Lieutenant Colonel W. R. Chichester in the aftermath of the First World War. A a further inscription was later added to mark the Second World War. The memorial is a tall thin Portland stone octagonal pillar topped by a sculpture of a pelican vulning herself, a heraldic and Christian symbol of sacrifice.

The memorial was designed by the Arts and Crafts architect and designer C. F. A. Voysey. It has been Grade II listed on the National Heritage List for England since June 1973. Voysey's only other freestanding war memorial, the Potters Bar war memorial, was designed in 1920.

No names are recorded on the memorial; this was a deliberate decision to represent the many local people wounded but not killed in the war. It was built at a cost of £800–900.

== Inscription ==
The memorial is inscribed:

1914–1918 / IN THANKFULNESS TO GOD FOR VICTORY & IN HONOUR OF DEVOTION, SELF-SACRIFICE & GLORIOUS ACHIEVEMENT / ALSO IN MEMORY OF THOSE WHO GAVE THEIR LIVES IN THE SECOND WORLD WAR 1939–1945
