= Cockfosters War Memorial =

War memorial in London

Coordinates: 51°39′18″N 0°09′09″W

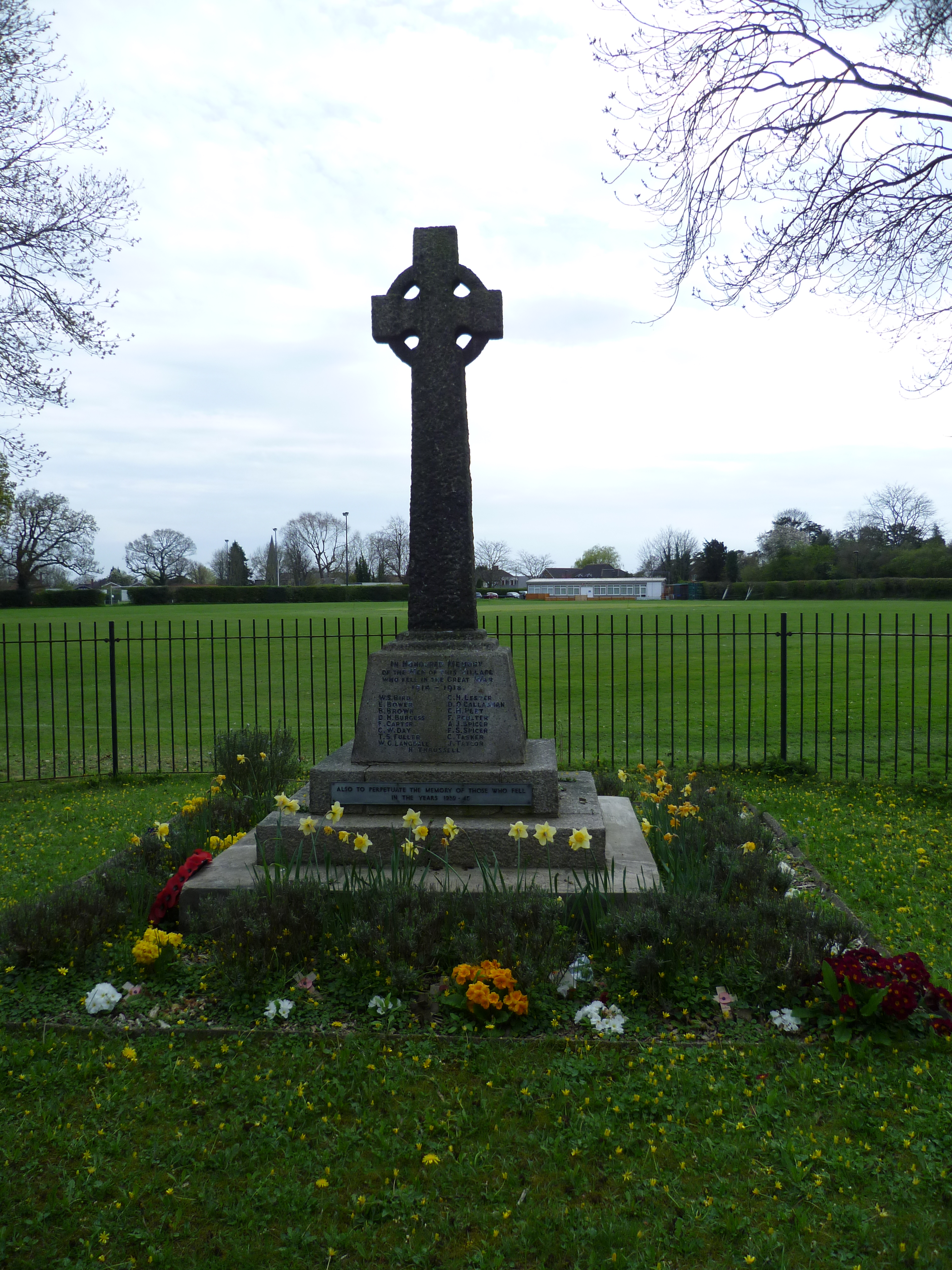
Cockfosters War Memorial

The Cockfosters War Memorial is located at the junction of Chalk Lane and Cockfosters Road in Cockfosters, London. It commemorates the men of the district who died in the first and second World Wars and is in the form of a tapered column with a celtic cross at the top and the names of the dead on the base. It was unveiled by the Bishop of Willesden in March 1921.
