= Holme Valley War Memorial =

Coordinates: 53°34′44″N 1°47′1″W

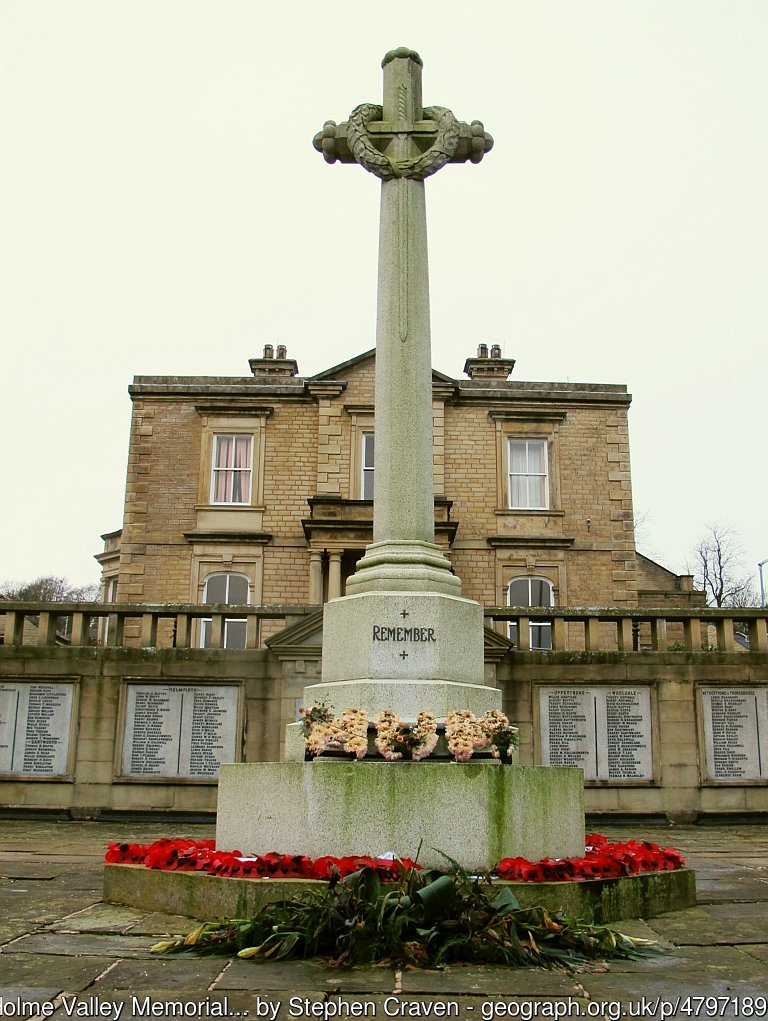
Holme Valley war memorial

Holme Valley War Memorial is a war memorial in the grounds of the Holme Valley Memorial Hospital Holmfirth, West Yorkshire, in England. It was unveiled in July 1921, by Colonel H. R. Headlam (Retired), who had previously commanded the 5th Battalion, Duke of Wellington's West Riding Regiment.

The memorial consists of a simple cross with the names of fallen soldiers inscribed on tablets on a balustered wall behind it.

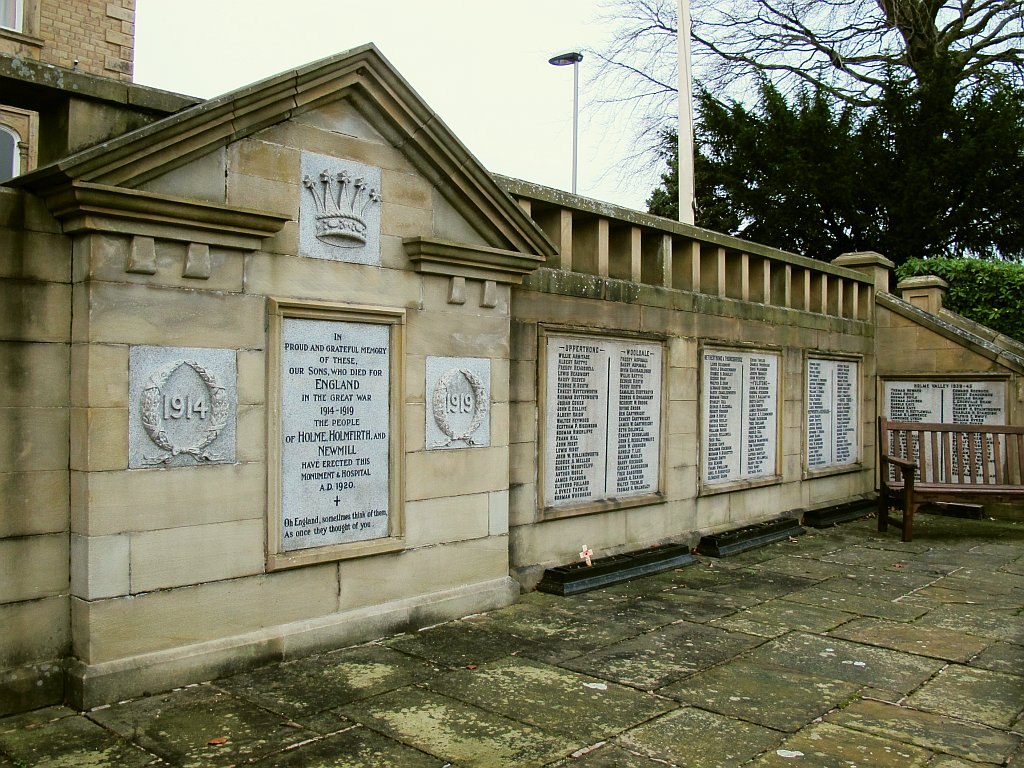
Names behind cross, on right

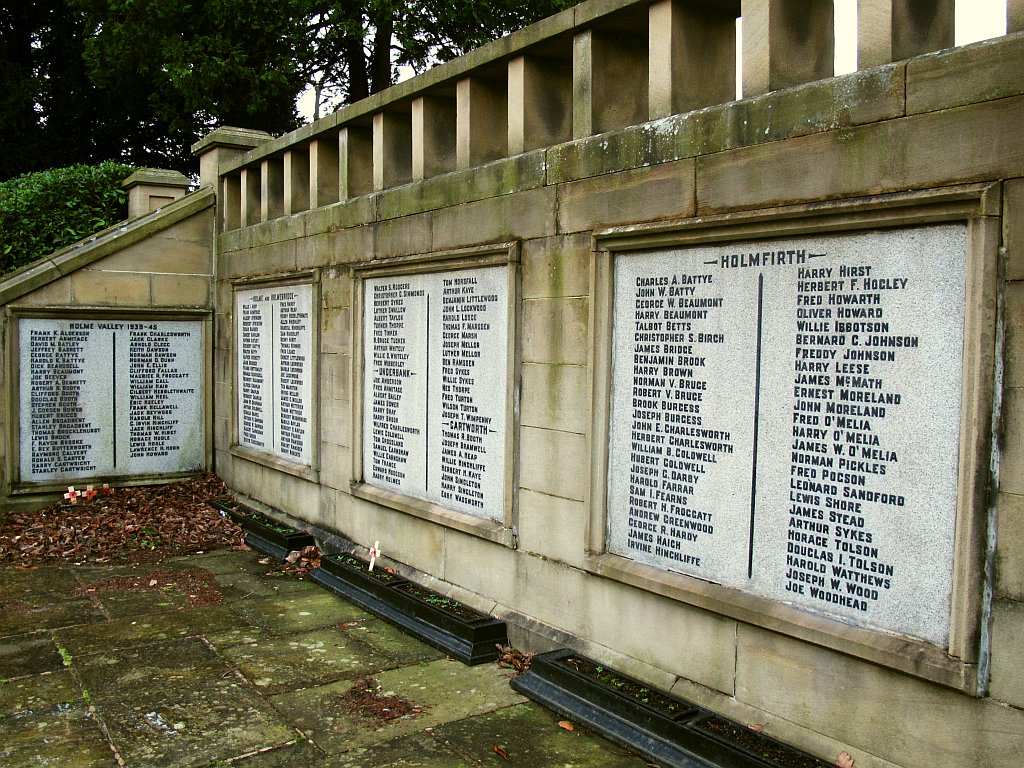
Names behind cross, on left
