= Mitchell War Memorial =

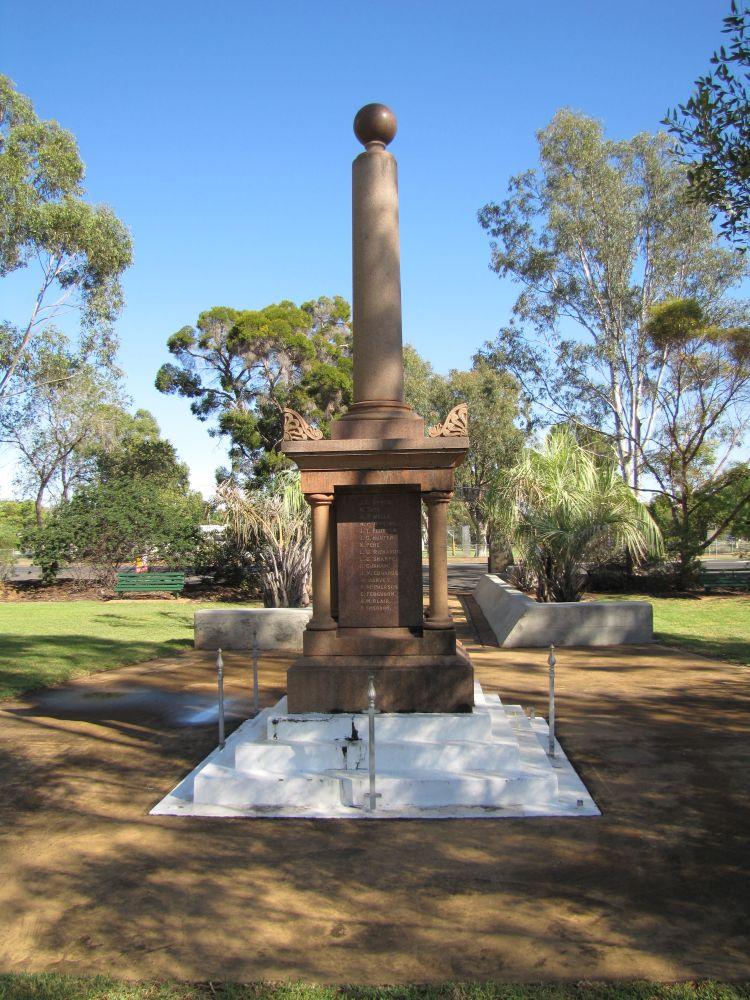
- Mitchell War Memorial, 2013

- Location within Queensland
- 26.4892°S 147.9718°E
- Location: Cambridge Street, Mitchell, Maranoa Region, Queensland, Australia

History
- Design period: 1919–1930s (interwar period)
- Built: 1927

Site notes
- Architect: Andrew Lang Petrie and Son

Queensland Heritage Register
- Official name: Mitchell War Memorial
- Type: state heritage (built)
- Designated: 21 October 1992
- Reference no.: 600038
- Significant period: 1927– (social); 1920s (historical); 1927 (fabric)
- Significant components: memorial surrounds/railings, memorial/monument
- Builders: Andrew Lang Petrie

Mitchell War Memorial is a heritage-listed memorial at Cambridge Street, Mitchell, Maranoa Region, Queensland, Australia. It was designed and built in 1927 by Andrew Lang Petrie and Son. It was added to the Queensland Heritage Register on 21 October 1992.

== History ==
The Mitchell War Memorial was unveiled in 1927 by Major Thomas Glasgow. It was designed and produced by monumental masonry firm A L Petrie of Toowong, Brisbane and honours the 51 local fallen of the First World War. It cost £464, which was raised by local residents.

The Mitchell Downs run was taken up during the 1850s. A Post Office opened at Mitchell Downs in 1865 with mail services commencing for the surrounding district at this time. The Reserve for the town of Mitchell was gazetted in 1869, on the site of the Mitchell Downs head station, the owners having erected another homestead further west. The Booringa Division was gazetted in 1879 and Mitchell became the administrative centre for the Division and later the Booringa Shire. The Western railway line was extended to Mitchell in 1885, and Mitchell consolidated its position as the business centre of the surrounding pastoral district.

Australia, and Queensland in particular, had few civic monuments before the First World War. The memorials erected in its wake became our first national monuments, recording the devastating impact of the war on a young nation. Australia lost 60,000 from a population of about 4 million, representing one in five of those who served. No previous or subsequent war has made such an impact on the nation.

Even before the end of the war, memorials became a spontaneous and highly visible expression of national grief. To those who erected them, they were as sacred as grave sites, substitute graves for the Australians whose bodies lay in battlefield cemeteries in Europe and the Middle East. British policy decreed that the Empire war dead were to be buried where they fell. The word "cenotaph", commonly applied to war memorials at the time, literally means "empty tomb".

Australian war memorials are distinctive in that they commemorate not only the dead. Australians were proud that their first great national army, unlike other belligerent armies, was composed entirely of volunteers, men worthy of honour whether or not they paid the supreme sacrifice. Many memorials honour all who served from a locality, not just the dead, providing valuable evidence of community involvement in the war. Such evidence is not readily obtainable from military records, or from state or national listings, where names are categorised alphabetically or by military unit.

Australian war memorials are also valuable evidence of imperial and national loyalties, at the time, not seen as conflicting; the skills of local stonemasons, metalworkers and architects; and of popular taste. In Queensland, the digger (soldier) statue was the popular choice of memorial, whereas the obelisk predominated in the southern states, possibly a reflection of Queensland's larger working-class population and a lesser involvement of architects.

Many of the First World War monuments have been updated to record local involvement in later conflicts, and some have fallen victim to unsympathetic re-location and repair.

There were many different types of memorials erected in Queensland; however this is the only known one of this design. The design is unusual, as are the materials.

The memorial was made and presumably designed by the Brisbane monumental masonry firm of A L Petrie and Son. At this time, they were the largest monumental masonry firm in Queensland and supplied many memorials throughout the state.

Further names were subsequently added for those who served or died in World War II.

== Description ==
The First World War Memorial is located in a park setting and is surrounded by cast iron posts with decorative finials.

The sandstone and granite memorial sits on a stepped concrete base with the cast iron posts fixed into the lower step. Above this is a smooth faced step capped with a cyma recta moulding. The front face bears the words "Their Name Liveth Forever More".

Surmounting the base is a smooth faced step with a chamfered central section on each face. The non-chamfered corners provide bases for columns with Doric order capitals and bases which surround a recessed plates of red polished granite. The plates bear an inscription and the cut and (originally) gilded names of the 51 local who served from the First World War. The uppermost section of the front plate bears an AIF badge.

The four columns support a large entablature comprising a smooth faced fascia and a concave cornice. Each corner is surmounted by large acroteria. Positioned in the centre of the entablature is a red granite column which sits on a square base step. It has a simply moulded base and no capital and is capped by a polished red granite sphere.

== Heritage listing ==
Mitchell War Memorial was listed on the Queensland Heritage Register on 21 October 1992 having satisfied the following criteria.

The place is important in demonstrating the evolution or pattern of Queensland's history.

War Memorials are important in demonstrating the pattern of Queensland's history as they are representative of a recurrent theme that involved most communities throughout the state. They provide evidence of an era of widespread Australian patriotism and nationalism, particularly during and following the First World War. The monuments manifest a unique documentary record and are demonstrative of popular taste in the inter-war period.

The place demonstrates rare, uncommon or endangered aspects of Queensland's cultural heritage.

The memorial is an unusual design and is the only one of its type in Queensland.

The place is important in demonstrating the principal characteristics of a particular class of cultural places.

Erected in 1927, the war memorial at Mitchell demonstrates the principal characteristics of a commemorative structure erected as an enduring record of a major historical event. This is achieved through the use of appropriate materials and design elements.

The place is important because of its aesthetic significance.

It is of aesthetic significance for its high level of workmanship, materials and design.

The place has a strong or special association with a particular community or cultural group for social, cultural or spiritual reasons.

It has a strong and continuing association with the community as evidence of the impact of a major historic event and as the focal point for the remembrance of that event.

The place has a special association with the life or work of a particular person, group or organisation of importance in Queensland's history.

It also has special association with monumental masonry firm, A L Petrie and Son as an example of their workmanship.
