= Great Missenden War Memorial =

Coordinates: 51°42′03″N 0°41′57″W

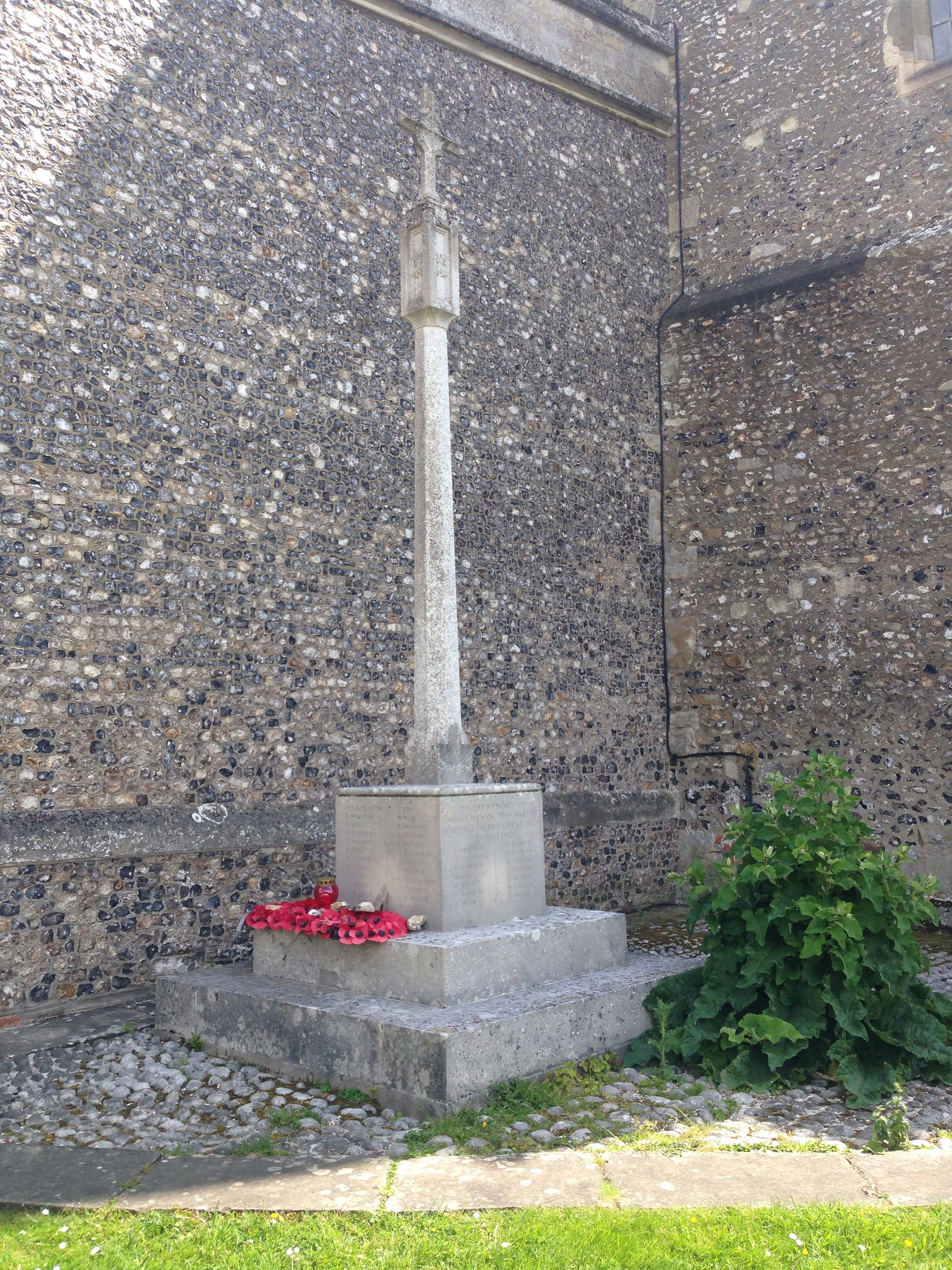
The memorial in September 2016.

The Great Missenden War Memorial is located at the Church of St Peter and St Paul in the village of Great Missenden in Buckinghamshire. The memorial marks the deaths of local individuals who died fighting in World War I and World War II. It was dedicated on 8 May 1920 by the Bishop of Buckingham, Edward Shaw. The memorial is a tall thin stone pillar cross, with a two step base.

Two smaller stone memorial plaques in Great Missenden also honour local residents who died fighting in the world wars. A British Legion plaque is located at 52 High Street in Great Missenden, and another plaque is located inside the memorial hall on the Link Road. The memorial hall plaque was unveiled by the Lord Lieutenant of Buckinghamshire, Charles Wynn-Carington, 1st Marquess of Lincolnshire on 12 May 1921. A grant of £411 was given to repair the High Street plaque by the War Memorials Trust in 2008 after the letters had become faint.

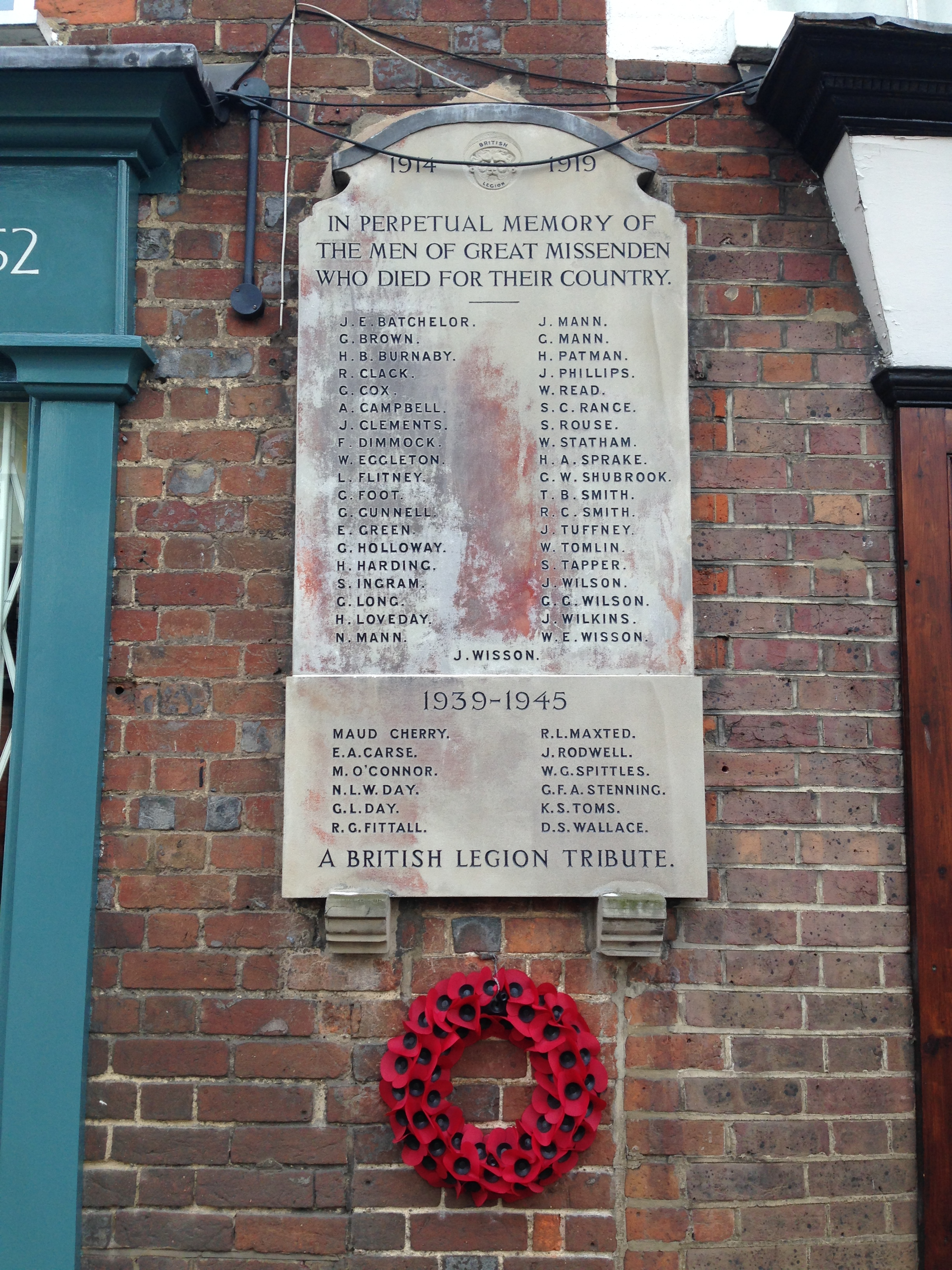
The British Legion memorial plaque on the High Street in March 2016.

The three memorials list 51 individuals from the village; 39 of whom died in World War I and 12 who died in World War II.
