= Soldiers and McKinley Memorial Parkways =

Brick streets in Fremont, Ohio

- Soldiers Memorial Parkway and McKinley Memorial Parkway
- U.S. National Register of Historic Places
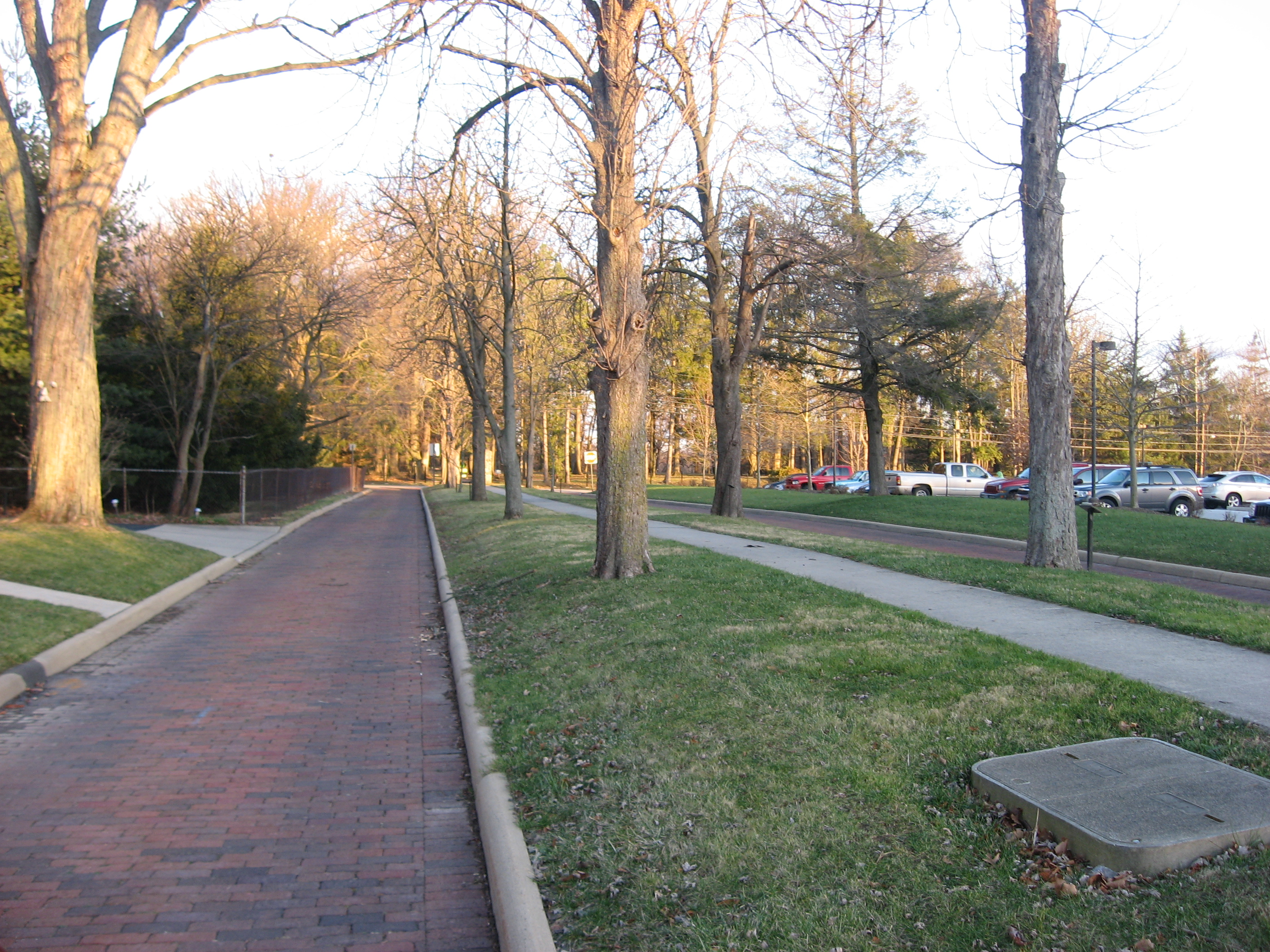
- Looking eastward along McKinley Memorial Parkway

- Location within Ohio Location within the United States
- Location: Soldiers Memorial Parkway and McKinley Memorial Parkway, Fremont, Ohio
- Coordinates: 41°20′24″N 83°7′59″W
- Area: 3.6 acres (1.5 ha)
- Built: 1918
- Architectural style: City Beautiful movement
- NRHP reference No.: 90002212
- Added to NRHP: January 25, 1991

The Soldiers and McKinley Memorial Parkways are a pair of historic brick streets in Fremont, Ohio, United States. Designed as small parkways, they were constructed in honor of Sandusky County's eighty-five soldiers who were killed in action during World War I. Unlike many similar streets in other cities, they were not built as centerpieces for grand city plans; instead, they were constructed to provide access to a subdivision that had recently been started.

Laid out in the form of a cross, the parkways run for four blocks with vegetation between the lanes for the two directions; they were completed in 1920 after a year of construction. Historic research has identified both streets as fine examples of the implementation of City Beautiful ideas in an extant city. Today, the parkways continue to provide access to a residential neighborhood; most of the houses that line the parkways are newer than the streets themselves, having been built primarily between 1930 and 1959.

In 1991, the two parkways were listed together on the National Register of Historic Places, qualifying both because of their importance in community planning and in landscape architecture.
