= Potters Bar War Memorial =

War memorial in Hertfordshire, England

Coordinates: 51°41′43″N 0°10′34″W

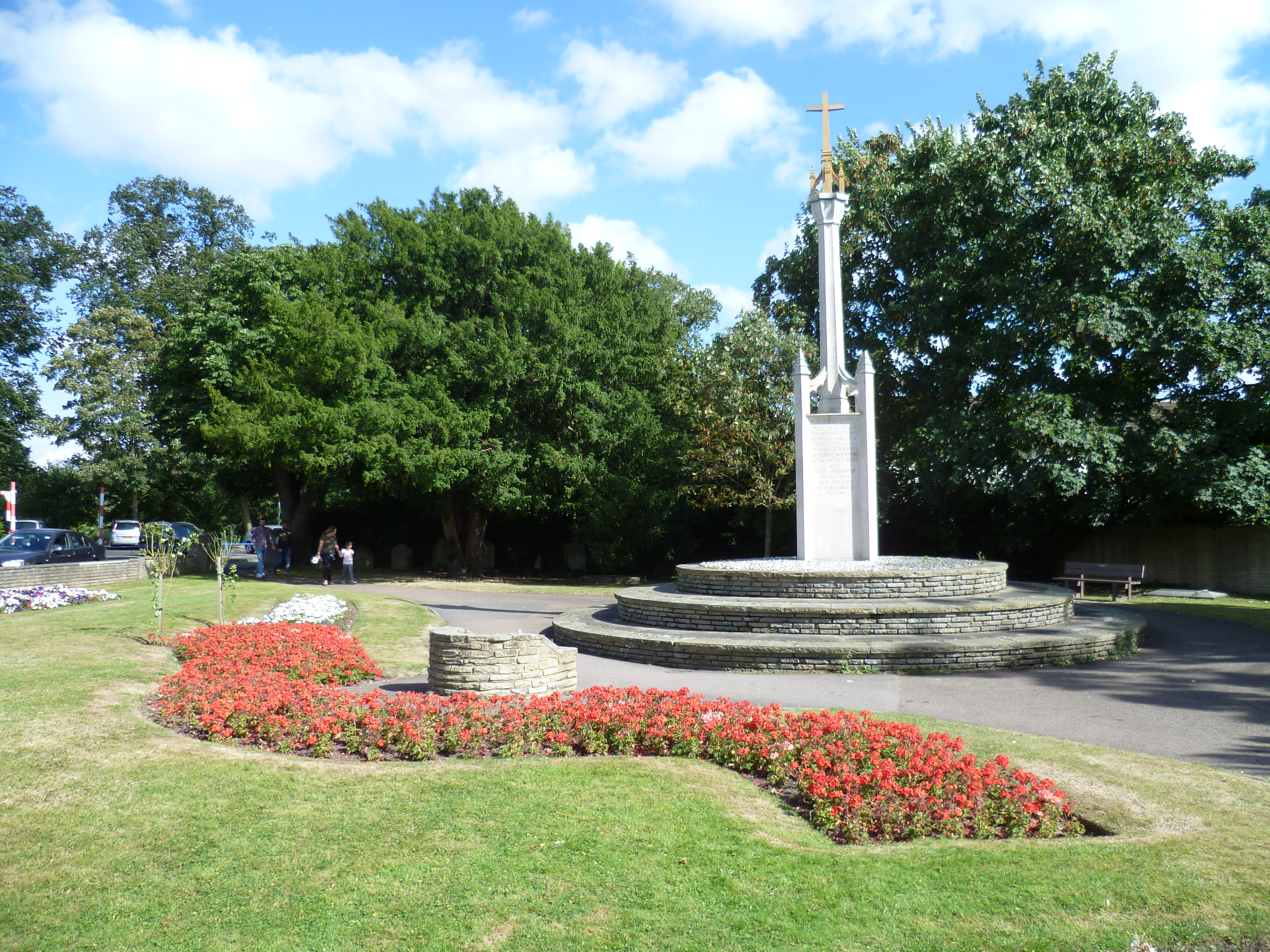
Potters Bar war memorial

Potters Bar war memorial is located in St John's Churchyard in High Street, Potters Bar, England. The memorial was designed by the Arts and Crafts architect and designer C.F.A. Voysey and originally stood at the junction of Hatfield Road and The Causeway. It has been Grade II listed on the National Heritage List for England since it was moved to its present location in December 1973. Voysey's only other free standing war memorial, the Malvern Wells War Memorial, was erected in 1920 in Malvern Wells in Worcestershire.

The memorial is on the site of the former St. John's Church which was replaced by St. Mary's Church, The Walk, in 1915 after St. John's became dilapidated.
