= Argonne Cross Memorial =

American WW1 memorial in Arlington

Argonne Cross
- United States
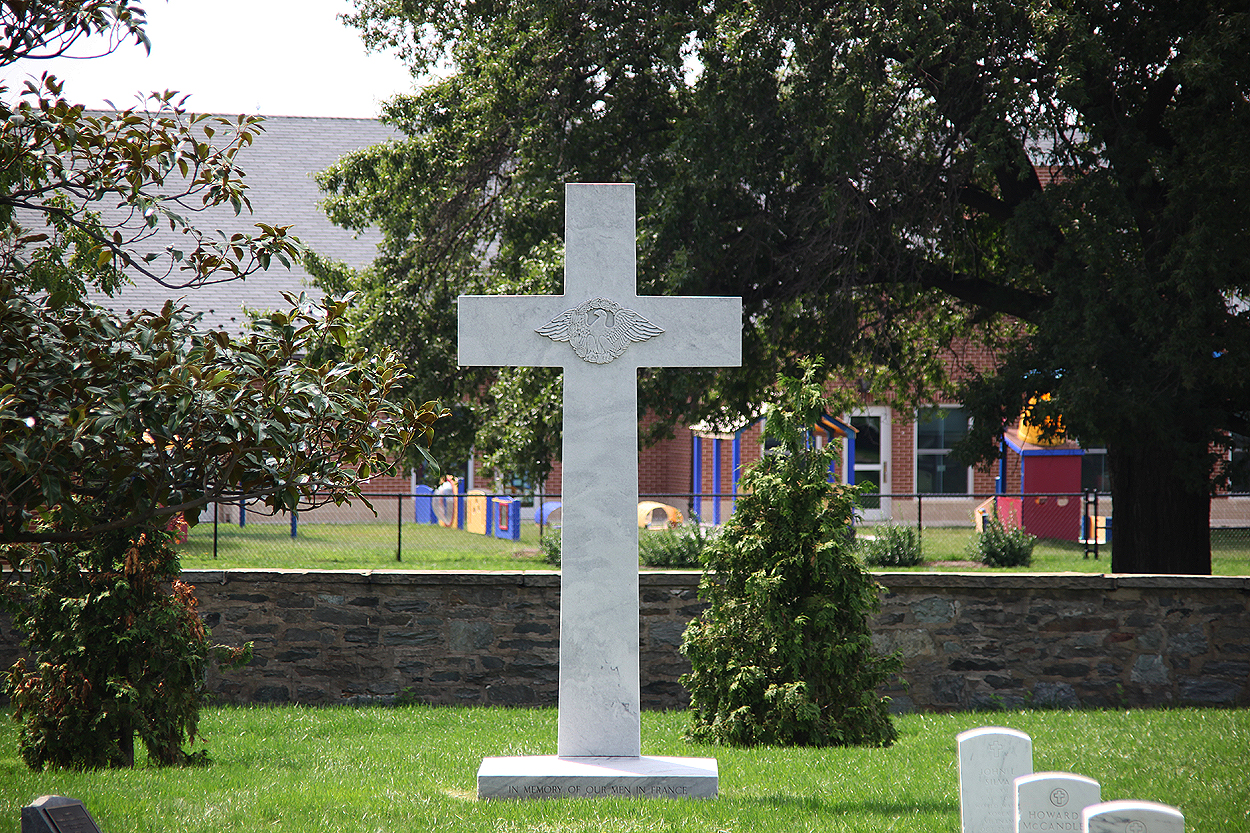
- The Argonne Cross in 2011
- For American military personnel who died in France during World War I
- Unveiled: November 13, 1923; 102 years ago
- Location: 38.871556°N 77.075556°W near Arlington County, Virginia, U.S.

The Argonne Cross Memorial is a memorial to American military personnel who died fighting in France during World War I. It was erected on November 13, 1923, and stands in Section 18 of Arlington National Cemetery in Arlington County, Virginia, in the United States.

== History ==
=== American dead at Arlington and the Women's Legion ===
United States armed forces numbered about 2.8 million during World War I, although only about 126,000 Americans died in the conflict. Many of the dead died in the United States of disease or at ships at sea, and just 79,531 were buried in Europe. Nonetheless, this was a significant number of burials. France, wishing to return to normal as quickly as possible, did not wish to see mass disinterments. But domestic pressure to "bring the boys home" led the American government to force the issue. The French relented, and some 20,000 American remains were returned to the United States. After the repatriation of American remains from other European countries, 30,799 Americans remained buried in Europe. Of the repatriated American remains 12.5 percent (or 5,241) were interred at Arlington National Cemetery. Most of these were buried in the southwest corner of the cemetery in Sections 17, 18, and 19.

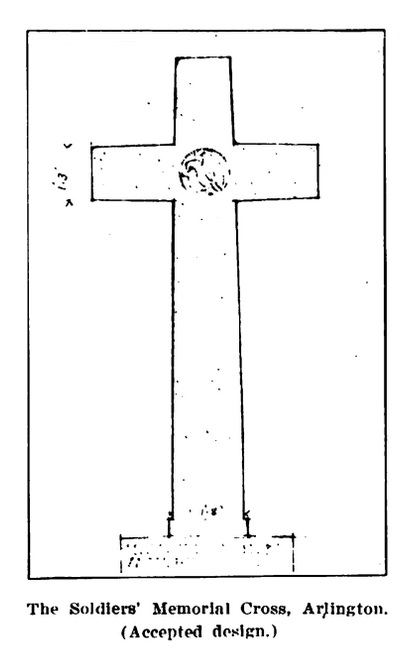
Design for the Argonne Cross approved the U.S. Commission of Fine Arts in 1921.

On October 25, 1919, Mary S. Lockwood co-founded the American Women's Legion in Washington, D.C., to assist veterans and their families and to engage in patriotic work. The organization swiftly grew into a national one. Lockwood had helped found the Daughters of the American Revolution several decades earlier, and she patterned the Women's Legion on the DAR. Membership in the Legion was open to any women who was a mother, wife, daughter, sister, or official next-of-kin of a veteran who served in World War I.

=== Building the memorial ===
Alice Hay Wadsworth, wife of the Senator James Wolcott Wadsworth, Jr., was elected president of the American Women's Legion in May 1920. Her two-year term began in 1921, and one of her immediate concerns was the erection of a monument to American war dead. The exact genesis of the memorial is unclear. What is known is that the organization made five separate submissions for a memorial to the United States Commission of Fine Arts, which had review (but not approval) authority over the "design and aesthetics" of all monuments and memorials on federal land. It is not clear when the commission approved the memorial, except that it did so some time in 1921 prior to November.

The Legion didn't yet have approval to erect any memorial. That did not come until November 17, 1921, when Secretary of War John Wingate Weeks designated a site 50 by 50 feet (15 by 15 m) in Section 18.

The memorial was built by the Argonne Unit of the American Women's Legion, a chapter dedicated to helping the more than 117,000 families whose loved ones were killed or wounded during the Meuse-Argonne Offensive of September 26 to November 11, 1918. The $2,500 memorial ($48,086 in 2025 dollars) was a plain Latin cross of white marble, to be dedicated to all those who died in the Great War. The chairman of the memorial committee was Miss Abbie B. McCammon, and the treasurer Miss N. R. Macomb. Mrs. William M. Black and Mrs. Alexander Rodgers were committee members.

Dedication of the memorial was originally set for Armistice Day (November 11) in 1922. but occurred a full year later. The dedication ceremony was a small one. Music for the event was provided by the 3d Cavalry Regiment Band. Episcopal Bishop Charles Brent, the former head chaplain of the American Expeditionary Forces during World War I, spoke briefly. The 3d Cavalry provided a 21-gun salute during the unveiling, and "Taps" was sounded at the ceremony's conclusion. First Lady Grace Coolidge, accompanied by Coolidge advisor Frank Stearns, represented President Calvin Coolidge at the event.

== About the memorial ==
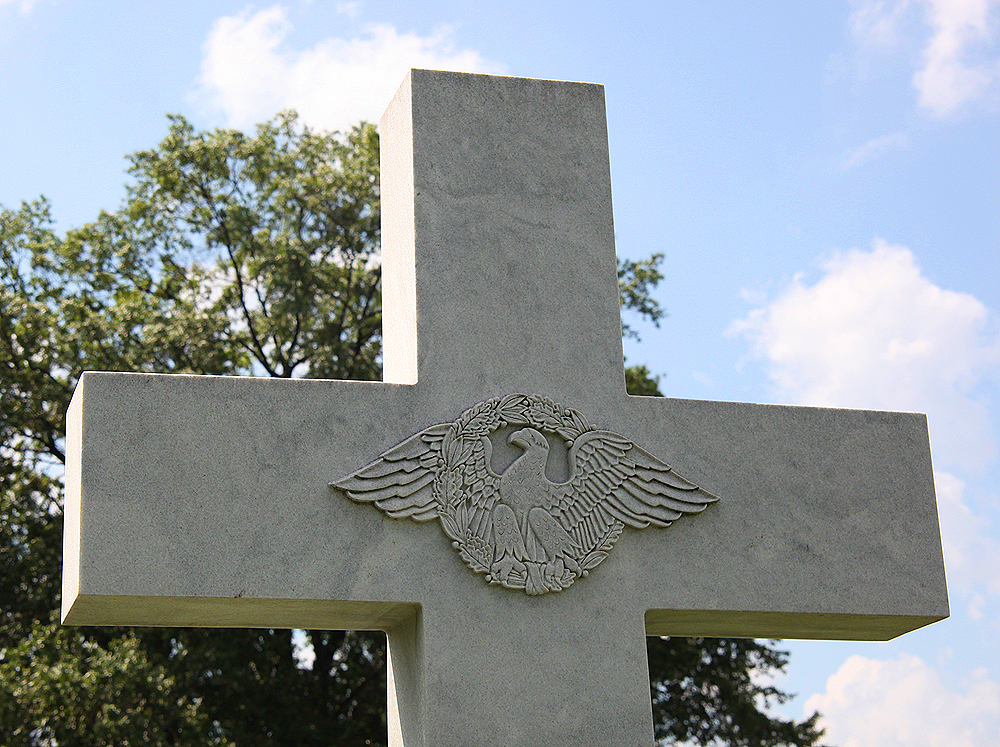
Carving at the crossarms of the memorial.

The Argonne Cross Memorial is located in Section 18 of Arlington National cemetery near the western wall. The memorial consists of a 13-foot (4.0 m) tall Latin cross of white marble from Vermont. The image of an eagle with outspread wings, clutching and appearing in the middle of a wreath, was carved where the arms of the cross met. The cross stands on a rectangular marble base about 6 inches (15 cm) high. On the front of this base is carved the original inscription:

IN MEMORY OF OUR MEN IN FRANCE
1917 - 1918

On the rear of the base is the following inscription:

ERECTED THROUGH THE EFFORTS OF THE
ARGONNE UNIT AMERICAN WOMEN'S LEGION

In accordance with a plan designed by the American Women's Legion and approved by the Commission of Fine Arts, the area around the memorial was landscaped. Nineteen pine trees, originally grown in the Forest of Argonne in France, were planted in an arc behind the memorial. Another element of the landscape design was a broad, grassy tapis vert between the headstones, leading to the memorial from Grant Avenue. Photographs from 1923 show that this "street of grass" was lined with deciduous trees. All the grading and landscaping work was performed by the War Department.

Little of the original landscaping survives. All of the original French pines died, and as of 2011 had been replaced with an arc of seven small pines. None of the trees lining the tapis vert survived, either. In the 1980s, the Armenian Apostolic Church of America was given permission to plant a southern magnolia about 10 feet (3.0 m) to the east-southeast of the Argonne Cross. This "living memorial" has a bronze plaque mounted on a granite pedestal at its base. This small memorial is dedicated to Armenian Americans who fought in the Meuse-Argonne campaign, and was dedicated on April 28, 1985.

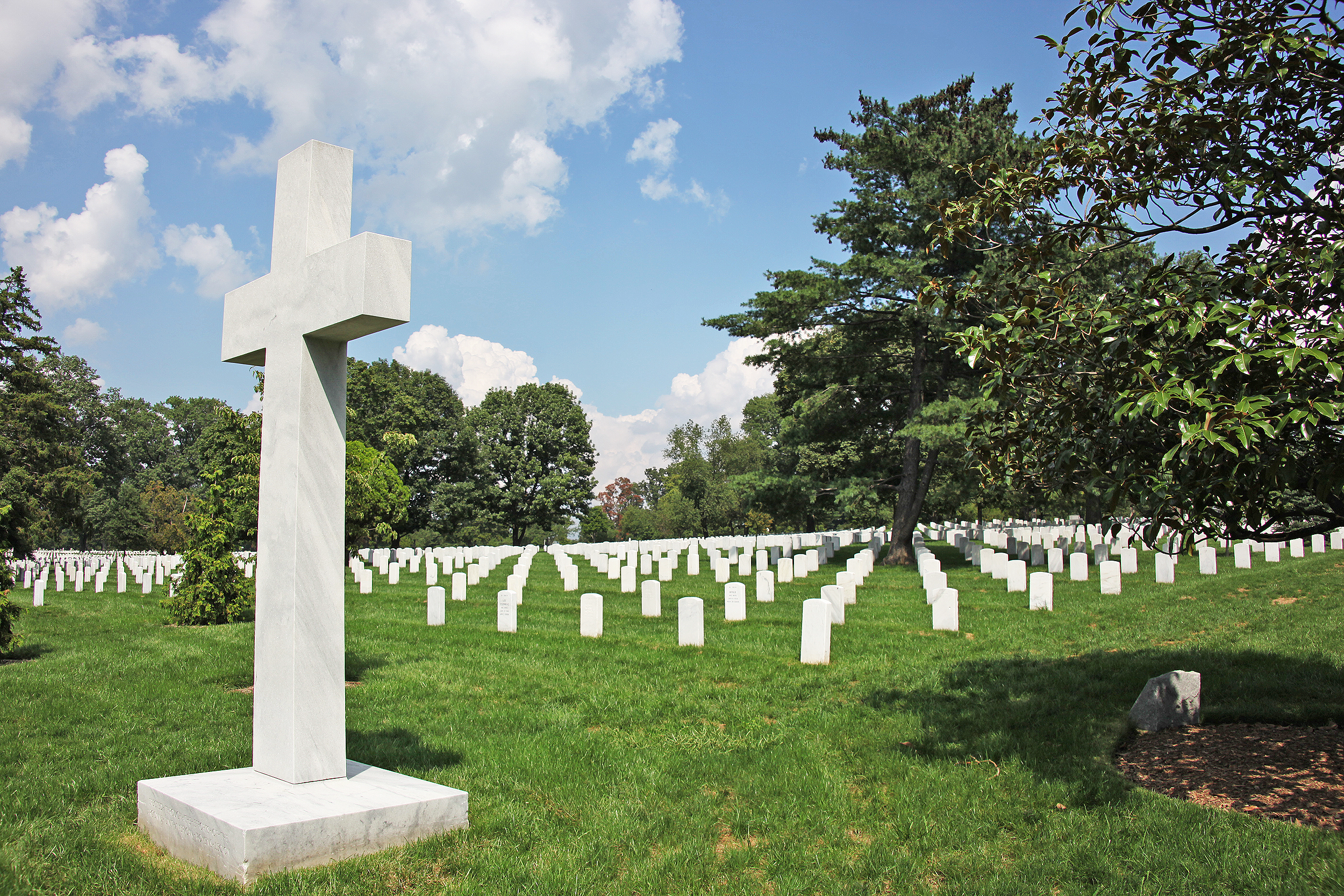
The Armenian American "living memorial" marker (lower right) near the Argonne Cross.

Explicitly religious memorials on property owned by the federal government is controversial. No lawsuit demanding the Argonne Cross Memorial's removal has been filed against the federal government as of November 2013. However, federal courts have mentioned the memorial in dicta. In January 2011, the United States Court of Appeals for the Ninth Circuit discussed the Argonne Cross as part of its ruling in Jewish War Veterans v. City of San Diego, 629 F.3d 1099, 1108 (9th Cir. 2011). The court noted the existence of Argonne Cross at Arlington National Cemetery and similar crosses at Gettysburg National Military Park. Such crosses, overwhelmed by a nonsectarian environment, are unlikely to run afoul of the Constitution's prohibition on establishment of religion. The Ninth Circuit observed:

None of these crosses is a prominent or predominant feature of the cemetery, and the overall image and history of this military burial ground are not founded on religion. All three crosses stand among, if not immediately next to, the countless headstones of soldiers buried in Arlington and alongside a large number of other monuments that do not incorporate religious imagery. Headstone after headstone, punctuated by the eternal flame at President Kennedy's grave site, represent the imagery of Arlington. Much the same can be said for the Irish Brigade Monument and the monument to the 142nd Pennsylvania Infantry. Those monuments, which stand at Gettysburg National Military Park, are also surrounded by other statues and monuments—including over 100 other monuments honoring Pennsylvania troops alone—that do not feature the cross. The Arlington and Gettysburg crosses are, in other words, non-dominant features of a much larger landscape providing a "context of history" and memory that overwhelms the sectarian nature of the crosses themselves.

The Supreme Court of the United States declined to review the case on June 25, 2012.

== Bibliography ==
- Caplow, Theodore. Recent Social Trends in the United States, 1960-1990. Montreal: McGill-Queen's University Press, 1991.
- Capozzola, Christopher. Uncle Sam Wants You: World War I and the Making of the Modern American Citizen. New York: Oxford University Press, 2008.
- Commission of Fine Arts. Ninth Report of the Commission of Fine Arts, July 1, 1919-June 30, 1921. Washington, D.C.: Government Printing Office, 1921.
- Commission of Fine Arts. Tenth Report of the Commission of Fine Arts, July 1, 1921-December 31, 1925. Washington, D.C.: Government Printing Office, 1926.
- DeGirolami, Marc O. The Tragedy of Religious Freedom. Cambridge, Mass.: Harvard University Press, 2013.
- Dickon, Chris (2011). The Foreign Burial of American War Dead: A History. Jefferson, NC: McFarland & Co. ISBN 978-0786446124. OCLC 659753667.
- Dodge, George W. Arlington National Cemetery. Charleston, S.C.: Arcadia Publishing, 2006.
- Hendricks, Genevieve Poyneer. Handbook of Social Resources of the United States. Washington, D.C.: American Red Cross, 1921.
- Mayo, James M. War Memorials as Political Landscape: The American Experience and Beyond. New York: Praeger, 1988.
- The National Cyclopaedia of American Biography. New York: J.T. White, 1946.
- Peters, James Edward. Arlington National Cemetery, Shrine to America's Heroes. Bethesda, Md.: Woodbine House, 2000.
- Poole, Robert M. On Hallowed Ground: The Story of Arlington National Cemetery. New York: Walker & Co., 2009.
- Subcommittee on Hospitals. National Policy on Cemeteries Provided for Burial of Veterans and Servicemen. Committee on Veterans' Affairs. U.S. House of Representatives. 88th Cong., 2d sess. Washington, D.C.: U.S. Government Printing Office, 1966.
