= War Memorial, Kapurthala =

War memorial in Kapurthala

- Statue of Jhaggar Singh
- Alternative names: Capt. Jhaggar Singh Memorial

General information
- Type: War memorial
- Architectural style: Indo-Saracenic
- Location: 124/6, New Mohabbatnagar Rd, Shakti Nagar, Ashok Vihar, Kapurthala, Punjab, India
- Coordinates: 31.37008551200769°N 75.3820791°E
- Year built: 1923–1926
- Groundbreaking: 11 March 1923
- Completed: 1926
- Inaugurated: 22 January 1927
- Client: Jagatjit Singh

Technical details
- Material: Red sandstone

Design and construction
- Known for: It commemorates soldiers from the State of Kapurthala who died during the World War I.

The War Memorial is a memorial in Kapurthala, in Punjab, India. It was built to honour and remember soldiers from the State of Kapurthala who lost their lives during the First World War. It is also locally known as the Capt. Jhaggar Singh Memorial.

== Background ==
Jagatjit Singh

When the First World War began in 1914, Jagatjit Singh, the Maharaja of Kapurthala, at once placed the resources of his state at the disposal of the Government of India to support the British war effort. His offer was accepted by the Government. The state's Imperial Service Infantry sailed for Mombasa on 19 September 1914 and remained on active service for about four years in East Africa. Besides this, the state also provided recruits to the Indian Army. These recruits numbered between 4,000 and 5,000. The state forces, during the course of their service abroad, were praised by all for being well organised, active in their duties, and capable of performing effectively in combat. The state forces suffered eighteen deaths in action; one soldier died of wounds; sixteen were wounded; four were killed in accidents; and twenty-four died of disease. During the engagement at Marima, Captain Jhaggar Singh and thirteen other ranks were killed while fighting. Gordon, a Special Service Officer, was fatally wounded while on patrol duty, and his name was added to the regiment's roll of honour. When Edward VIII visited Kapurthala as the Prince of Wales in 1922, he praised the state's military contributions during the war in the following words:

I esteem it a privilege to be able in person to congratulate Your Highness and your State on your ready help in the Great War. The Kapurthala Imperial Service Regiment served with distinction in East Africa for nearly four years. During this period its strength was raised to 1,000 men, and everything that could be done was done to keep it in a state of efficiency.

== History ==
Jagatjit Singh later had this memorial commissioned to commemorate the soldiers from his state who lost their lives during the First World War, and to preserve their memory for future generations. Marquess of Reading, the then Viceroy and Governor-General of India, laid the foundation stone of the memorial on 11 March 1923. The Marquess said on the occasion:

In the first place I wish to pay a tribute to those brave soldiers of this state who at the word of their Maharaja went forth to lay down their lives, far from their homes in distant countries, fighting side by side with the forces of the King-Emperor in the cause of humanity. This monument will stand to remind those who come after of their great service and sacrifice. When time has softened the poignancy of grief, it will be a source of pride to the families to which those brave men belonged; and it will serve as an inspiration for all time to future generations in this state to cherish the priceless virtues of loyalty and courage which those men so nobly practised in their lives even to life's end.

Its construction was completed in 1926. It was inaugurated on 22 January 1927 by William Birdwood, the then Commander-in-Chief of India. It was the first memorial of its kind to be built in a princely state.

== Features ==
It is made of red sandstone in the Indo-Saracenic style. It houses a statue of Jhaggar Singh made of bronze. This statue was made in Europe and arrived in Kapurthala in 1926.

== Gallery ==
Exterior view of the memorial

Veranda of the memorial

Exterior view of the memorial
