= World War I Memorial Flagpole (Hawkins) =

Public artwork in Wisconsin, U.S.

World War I Memorial Flagpole (Eagle)
- Artist: Benjamin Franklin Hawkins
- Year: 1932
- Dimensions: 200 cm × 130 cm × 130 cm (80 in × 53 in × 53 in)
- Location: Milwaukee, Wisconsin, U.S.; 43°2′26.588″N 87°53′56.581″W
- Owner: City of Milwaukee

World War I Memorial Flagpole (Eagle) is a public artwork by American artist Benjamin Franklin Hawkins located on the lakefront in Milwaukee, Wisconsin, United States. The artwork was made in 1932 from bronze and granite. It measures approximately 80 inches in height, and it sits at the Northeast corner of North Prospect Avenue and Lincoln Memorial Drive.

== Description ==
It is a flagpole topped with a bronze eagle; four stylized figures are cast in relief around the octagonal base. Dimensions at the base are approximately 17 1/2 x 57 x 57 inches.

Inscriptions
Side	Inscription
Inscribed on north side of sculpture	BENJAMIN HAWKINS SCULPTOR
South side of sculpture	A.KUNST.ART.F.D.Y.N.Y.C.
Around bottom band of sculpture	TO THE MEMORY OF THOSE WHO SERVED 1917 1918
On front, west side of base	ERECTED BY/SERVICE STAR LEGION/INCORPORATED/MILWAUKEE CHAPTER/1934 signed Founder's mark appears

== Information ==
It was sculpted by Benjamin Franklin Hawkins (born 1896) and made at Kunst Foundry.

Its Smithsonian Control Number is IAS 74020038.

Located in MacArthur Square, Northeast corner of North Prospect Avenue and Lincoln Memorial Drive, Milwaukee, Wisconsin, it is administered by the City of Milwaukee, Bureau of Bridges & Public Buildings, 841 North Broadway, Milwaukee, Wisconsin 53202.

It was erected by Service Star Legion, Inc. Milwaukee Chapter 1934. Moved June 1979 to present site from triangle at West Wells Street, North Plankinton and North 2nd streets.

It was surveyed July 1993 and rated as "Treatment needed".

== Bibliography ==
- Smithsonian American Art Museum "World War I Memorial Eagle, (sculpture)." Siris Art Inventories. Smithsonian. Web. 28 Nov. 2011.
