= Kilmarnock War Memorial =

War memorial in Kilmarnock, Scotland

Coordinates: 55.6076°N 4.4912°W

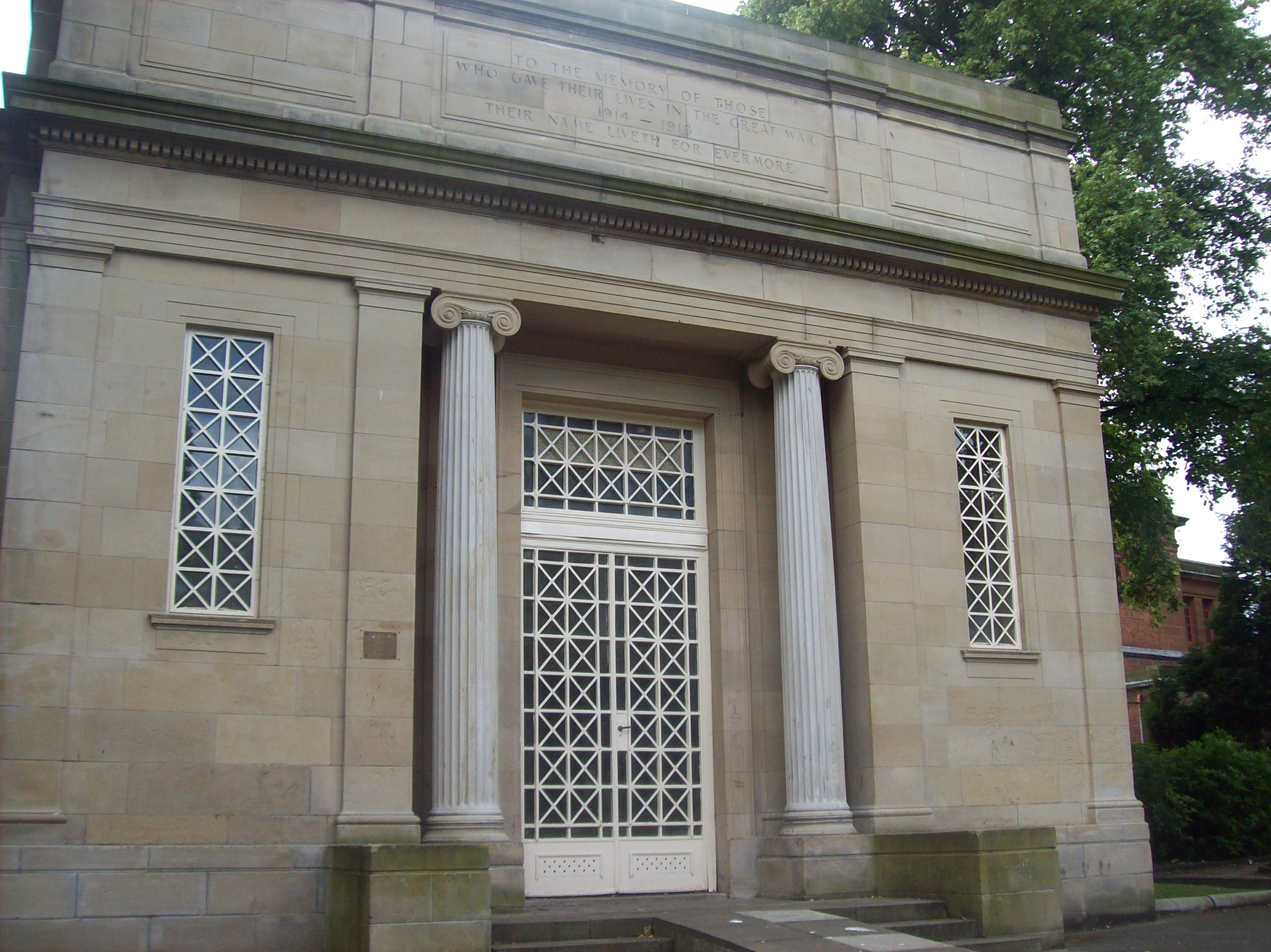
Kilmarnock War Memorial

The Kilmarnock War Memorial is a war memorial located in Kilmarnock, Scotland. Built in 1927, it pays tribute to all those who fought in the First World War, Second World War, Korean War & the Northern Ireland Conflict. The building is accessible to the public, although access is restricted to a degree.

Wall mounted inside are commemorative plaques to the following: First World War (1914-1918), Second World War (1939-1945), Second World War - civilians, Korean War (1950-1953), Northern Ireland Conflict; The Troubles (1969-1998).

Inside there is a figure cast in bronze, ‘The Victor’, whose head is bowed in silent contemplation of the cost of war. There are 6 Bronze Plaques for WW1 and 2 for WW2 with names, also Brass Plaques for Korean war and Northern Ireland Casualties, and a Bronze Figure of Victory. The 850 WW1 names originally have subsequently been added to.

The exterior plaque is dedicated to those who gave their lives in First World War, Second World War, Korean War & the Northern Ireland Conflict.
