= Monken Hadley War Memorial =

War memorial in London

Coordinates: 51°39′44″N 0°11′32″W

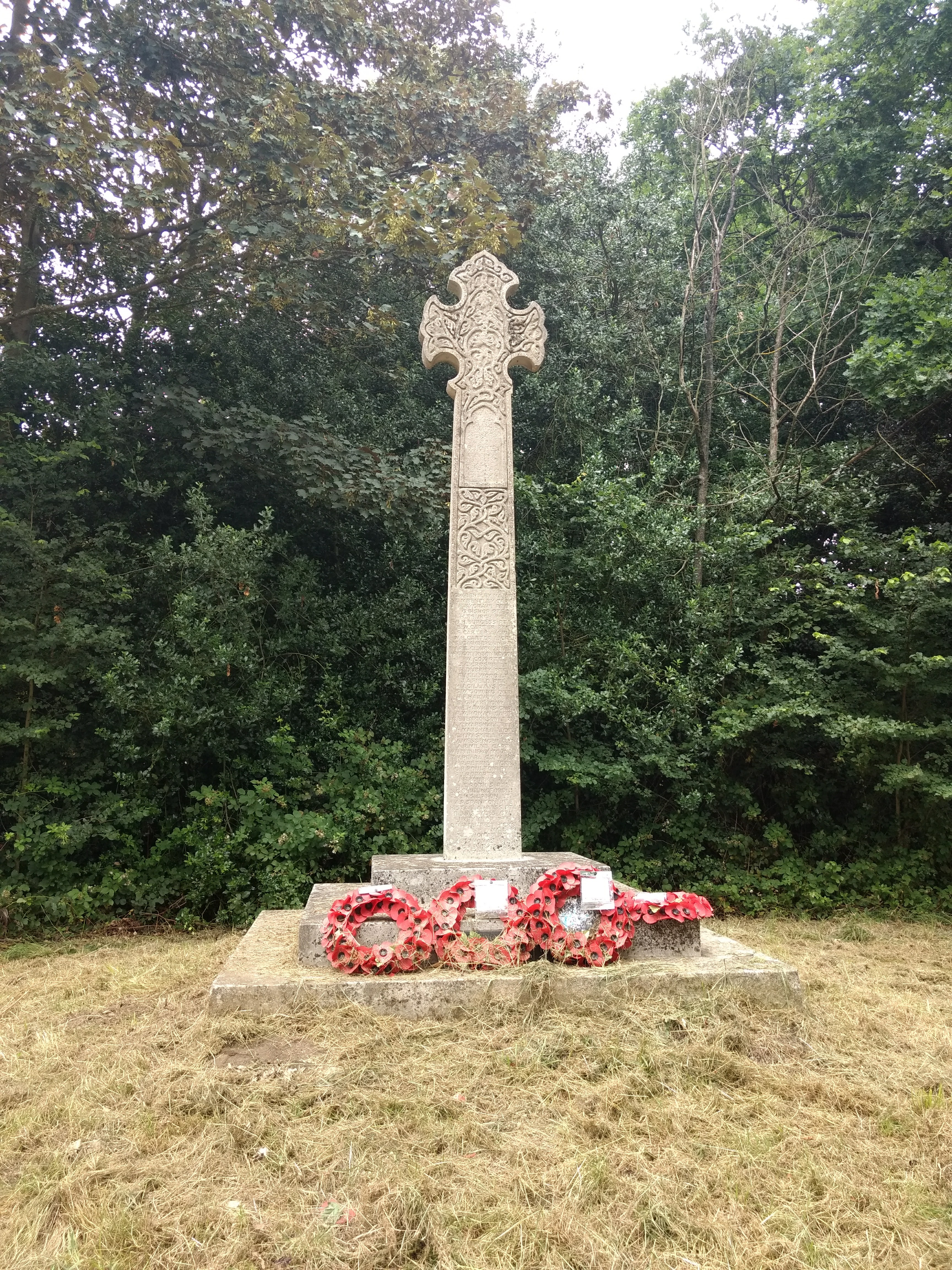
Monken Hadley War Memorial

The Monken Hadley War Memorial is located immediately to the north of Monken Hadley at the western end of Camlet Way in Monken Hadley Common. It commemorates the men of the district who died in the First and Second World Wars and is in the form of a tapered decorated column with a celtic cross at the top and the names of the dead shown on the shaft. It was unveiled by Francis Fremantle, Member of Parliament for St Albans, in December 1920. It became a Grade II listed building in April 2017.
