= Monument to heroes of World War I (Rostov-on-Don) =

Monument to heroes of the First World War
- Памятник героям Первой мировой войны
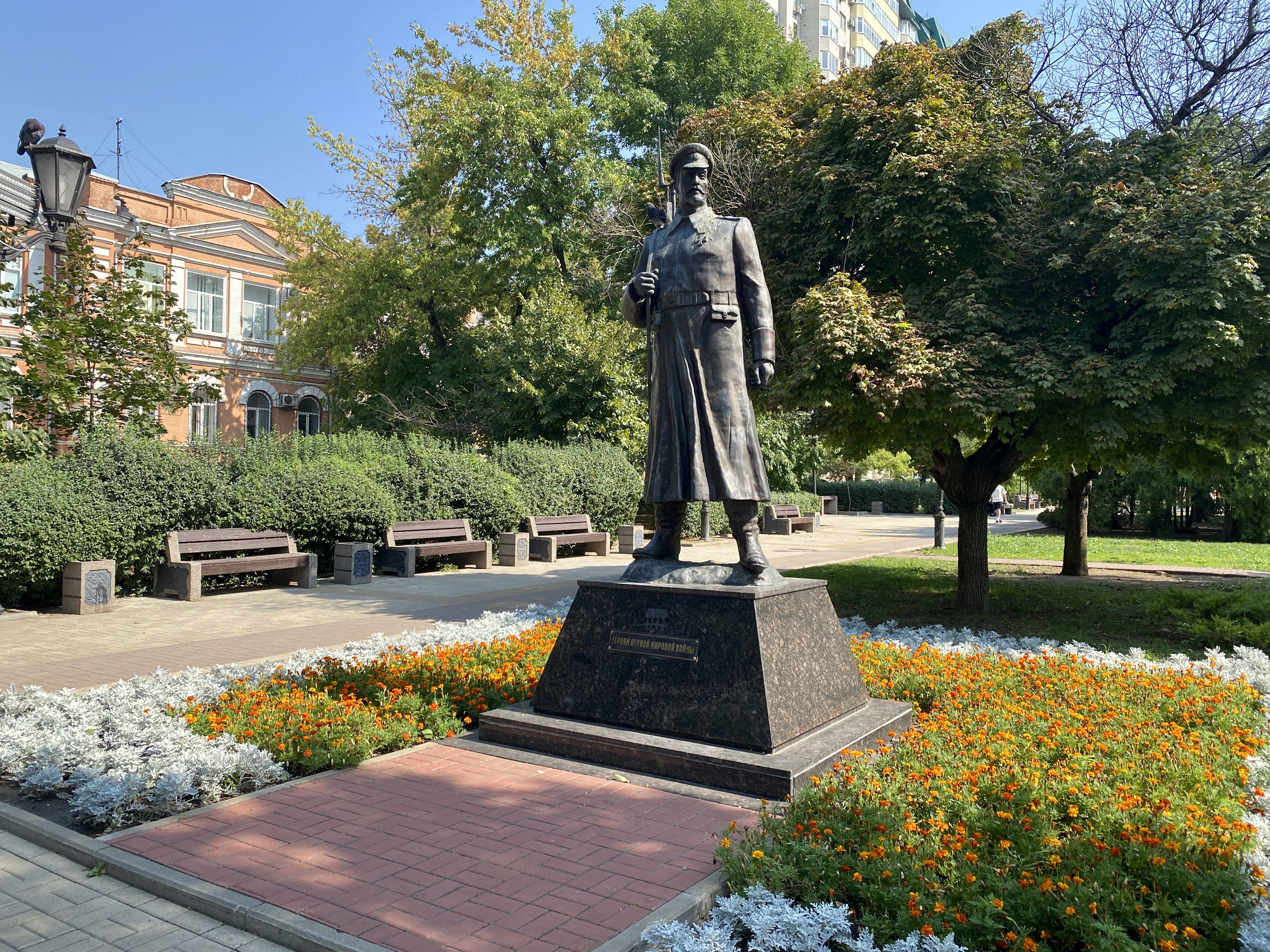
- Interactive map of Monument to heroes of the First World War
- Location: Rostov-on-Don, Rostov Oblast, Russia
- Designer: Sergey Mikhailovich Isakov
- Material: bronze, granite
- Height: 3.5 metres (11 ft)
- Beginning date: 2014
- Completion date: 2014
- Opening date: 1 August 2014

Monument to heroes of the First World War ― is a monument in the city of Rostov-on-Don, dedicated to the soldiers and officers of the Russian Imperial Army who fought in the First World War. It was erected in 2014 and is situated in the public square at the junction of Karsnoarmeyskaya street and Khalturinsky lane.

== Opening of the monument ==
2014 was the year of a century anniversary since the start of the First World War, the war in which Russian Empire actively participated on the Eastern Front. In 1917, primarily due to internal turmoil, the situation at the front became critical for Russia, and in March 1918, after the Bolsheviks had come to power, they entered into an extremely harsh for Russia peace treaty. In the Soviet Union the war was officially considered 'imperialist' and unjust, so the authorities never paid attention to commemorate the fallen soldiers.

The century anniversary of this significant event in many ways aroused public interest to memory of the war in Russia. In 2014, across the country there were held various cultural and scientific events devoted to this subject.

Special Commission on installation of monuments in Rostov-on-Don considered three sketches of the monument. At the end, the work by Merited Artist of Russia Sergei Mikhailovich Isakov was selected. The costs of manufacturing and installation were paid by Chamber of Commerce of the Rostov region.

Monument to the heroes of World War I in Rostov-on-Don was opened on August 1, 2014, on the day of Russia's entry into the war. The grand opening was attended by the mayor of the city, representatives of city administration, and local Cossacks.

The monument is a 3.5-meter-high bronze figure of a soldier in uniform and with a rifle on his shoulder.

Also, in whole Rostov Oblast there were established several monuments dedicated to the heroes of the First World War: in Shakhty, Novocherkassk, Bataisk and several other localities.
