= Dulwich College War Memorial =

War memorial in London

Coordinates: 51.4402°N 0.0841°W

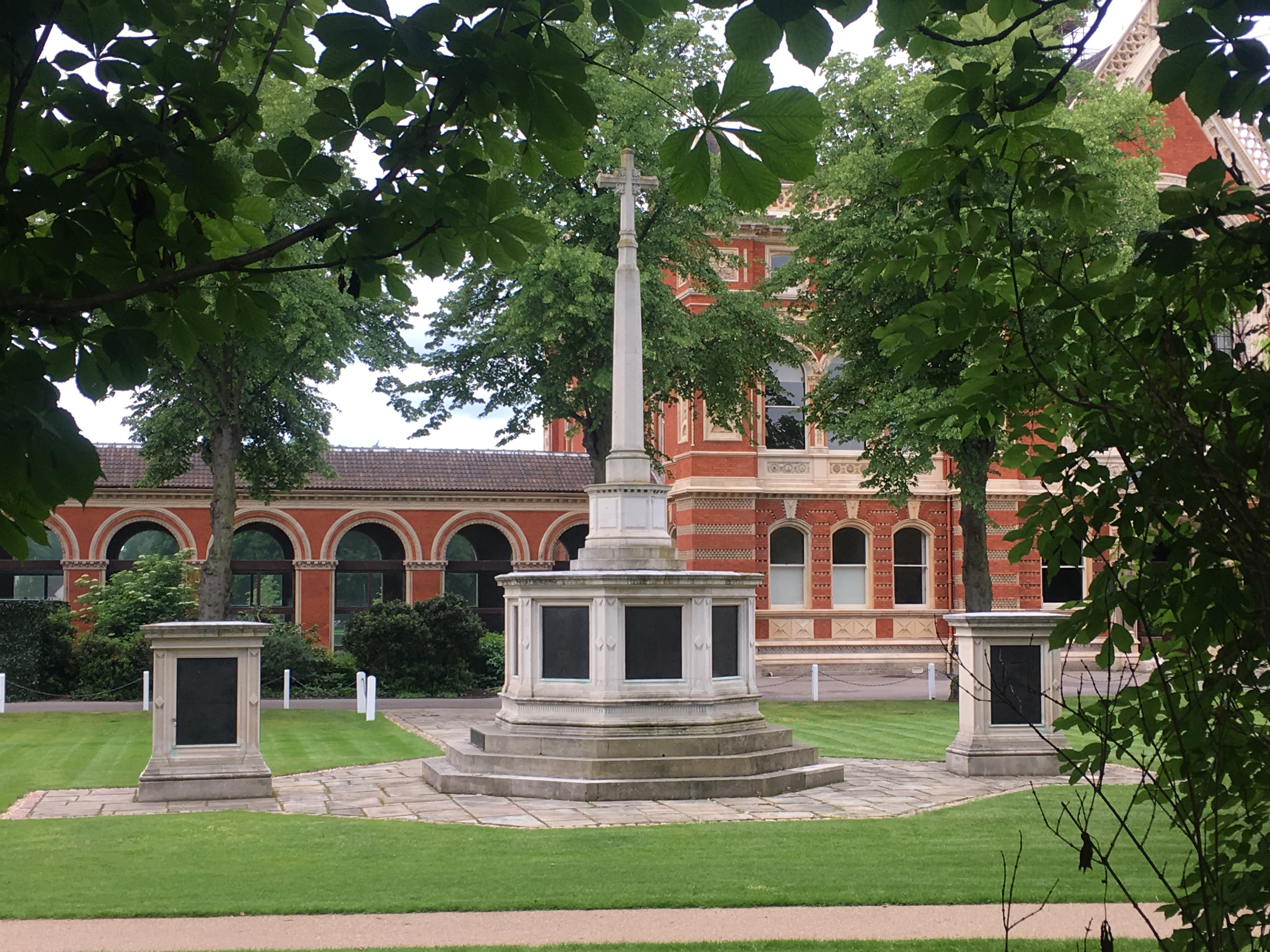
The War Memorial in June 2018

The Dulwich College War Memorial is located at the eastern front of Dulwich College on College Road in Dulwich in the London Borough of Southwark. It commemorates the alumni of the college who died in both the First and Second World Wars. The memorial was designed by W. H. Atkin-Berry, an alumnus of the college. It was unveiled on 17 June 1921, the Dulwich College Founder's Day, by Major General Sir Webb Gillman, and dedicated by the Dean of Durham, James Welldon. Gillman was an alumnus of the college, and Welldon had served as Master of Dulwich College from 1883 to 1885. It has been Grade II listed on the National Heritage List for England since May 2010. The heritage listing places the memorial within a "visual and contextual relationship" with the Grade II* listed Main College building.

== Description ==
The memorial is 9 meters (29 ft) in height and is in the form of an octagonal stone memorial cross of Portland stone on an octagonal pedestal on a larger pedestal. There are bronze panels on each face of the bottom pedestal. The two pedestals sit on three tiered steps on an octagonal base. A bronze plaque on the western face of the top tier of the memorial is decorated with the Dulwich College Coat of Arms. Below this plaque are the words MORTUI VIVUNT, a bronze plaque below is decorated with a laurel wreath and the words PUERI/ ALLEYNIENSES/ MCMXIV–MCMXIX. Seven further bronze panels list the 485 names of 481 pupils and 4 masters of the college who were killed in the First World War. Further names are on a smaller bronze plaque on the eastern face of the memorial. Instead of building a second memorial, the 352 alumni who were killed in the Second World War are commemorated by two plinths of Portland stone on the northern and southern sides of the memorial, with names of the dead marked on plinths on the eastern and western sides of the plinths.

The WWII plinths were designed by John Wells-Thorpe. Prior to the erection of the two memorial plinths, the memorial stood on a pavement parked by four square bollards, these were subsequently removed.

A new Great Hall for Dulwich College was also built as a memorial at a projected cost of £50,000. The "Dulwich College War Record" was published in two books, containing portraits and biographies of the pupils who died with a list of their official military Honours and Distinctions. The books also contained a Roll of over 3000 people associated with the college who served in the British armed forces.
