= Golders Green War Memorial =

War memorial in London

- United Kingdom
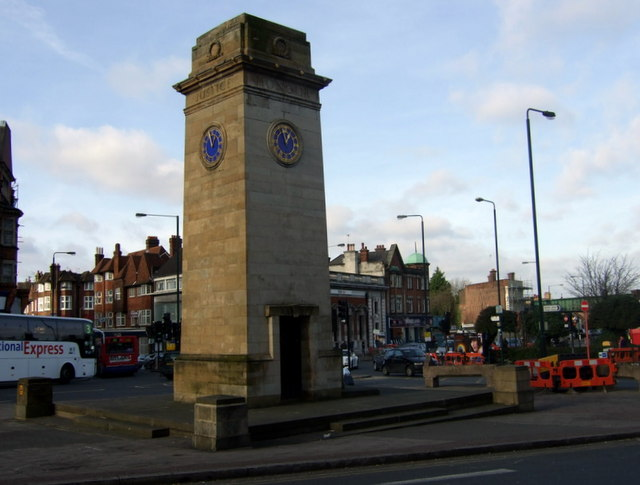
- The Golders Green War Memorial in 2008
- For victims of the First and Second World Wars
- Unveiled: 1923; 103 years ago
- Location: 51°34′18″N 0°11′43″W; Golders Green; London, NW11

The Golders Green War Memorial is a war memorial in Golders Green, North London, United Kingdom. The memorial, which takes the form of a clock tower, was dedicated on 21 April 1923. It commemorates both victims of World War I and World War II. The names of the honoured are written on a bronze wall plaque for World War I and on a bronze book for World War II. The name of Captain M Allmand VC was added at a later date to the victims of World War II.

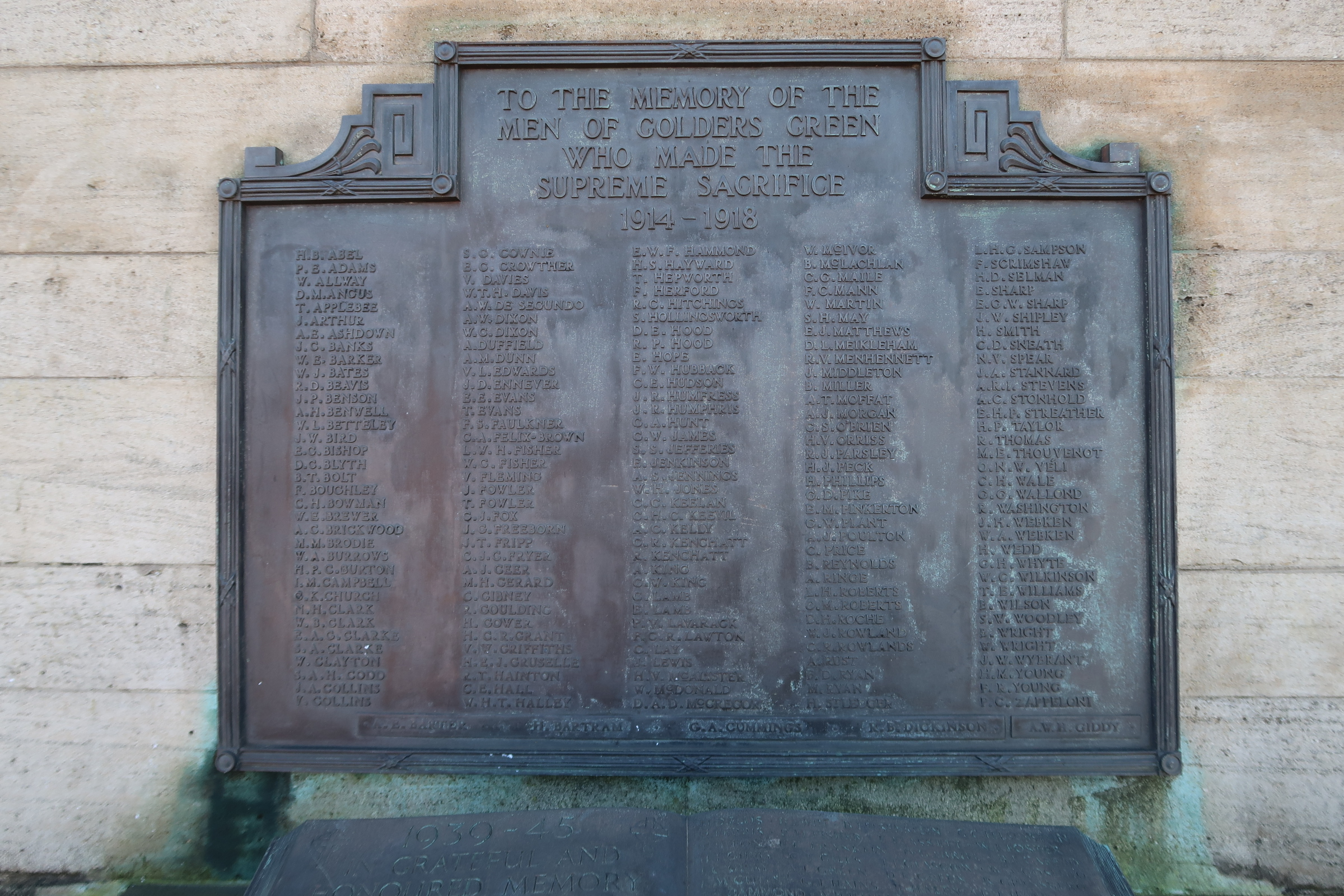
The names of the dead from WWI on the Golders Green War Memorial
