= United Services Club =

Golf club in India

United Services Club (also known as US Club) is a golf club located in Colaba area of Mumbai.

Established in 1937 by the Indian Army, it is now run jointly by the Indian Army, Indian Navy and Indian Air Force. The club has an 18-hole golf course. One of only three golf courses in the city, with the other two being the Willingdon Sports Club and Bombay Presidency Golf Club.
