= Wood Green War Memorial =

War memorial in London

Coordinates: 51°35′58″N 0°06′39″W

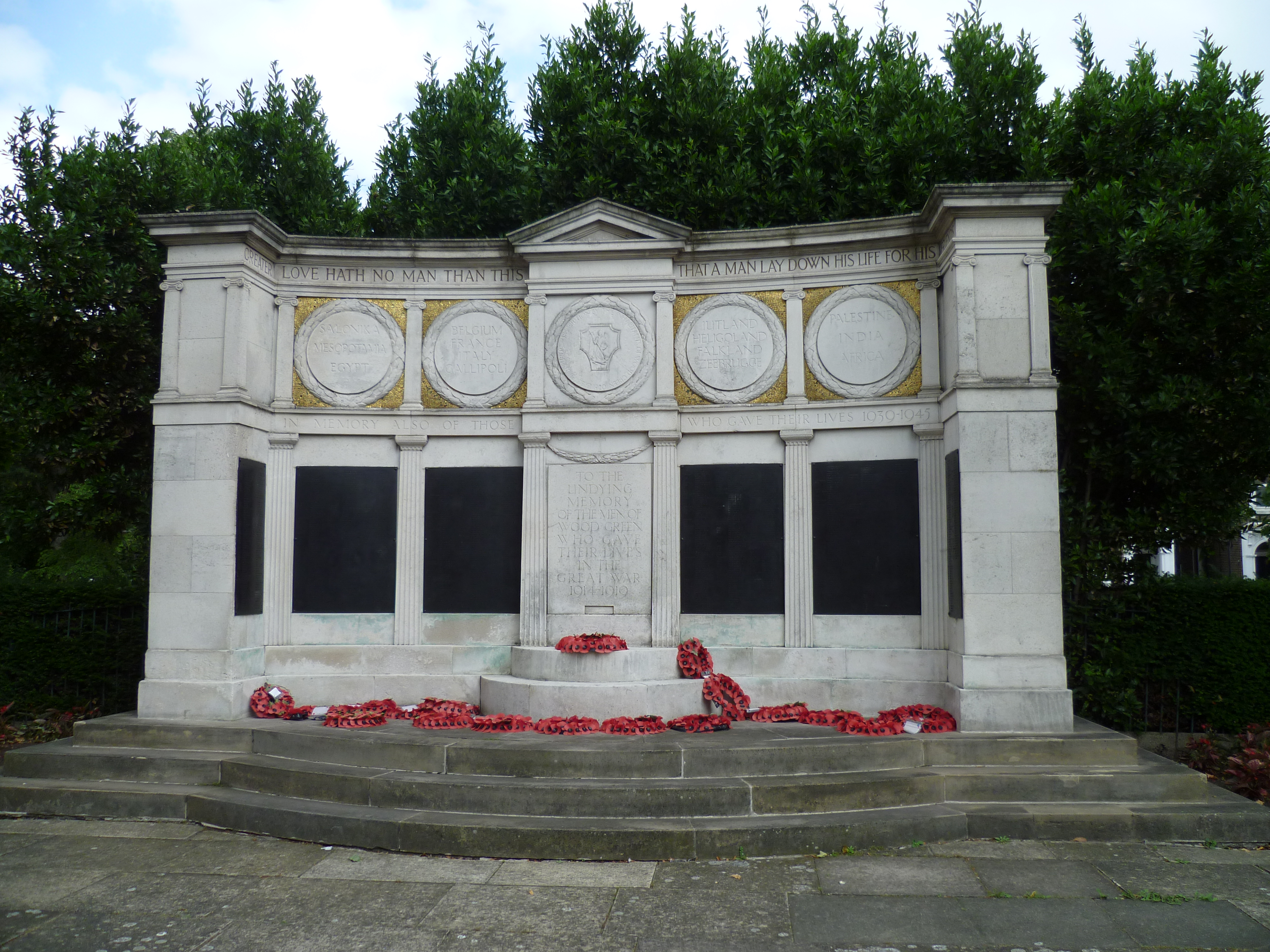
Wood Green War Memorial

The Wood Green War Memorial is located on the High Road, Wood Green, in the London Borough of Haringey. It was erected in 1920 and paid for by public subscription of the people of Wood Green to remember the men of the area who died during the First World War. It was subsequently adapted to include the dead of the Second World War. It is grade II listed with Historic England.
