= George Rae =

George Rae may refer to:

- George Rae (actor) (born 1978), Scottish actor
- George Rae (architect) (1901 – after 1935), Australian architect
- George Rae (banker) (1817–1902), British banker, stockbroker and patron of Dante Gabriel Rossetti
- George Rae (footballer), Scottish footballer
- George Rae (physician), British doctor and television presenter
- George Rae (cricketer), English cricketer and British Army officer
