= Gympie Memorial Park =

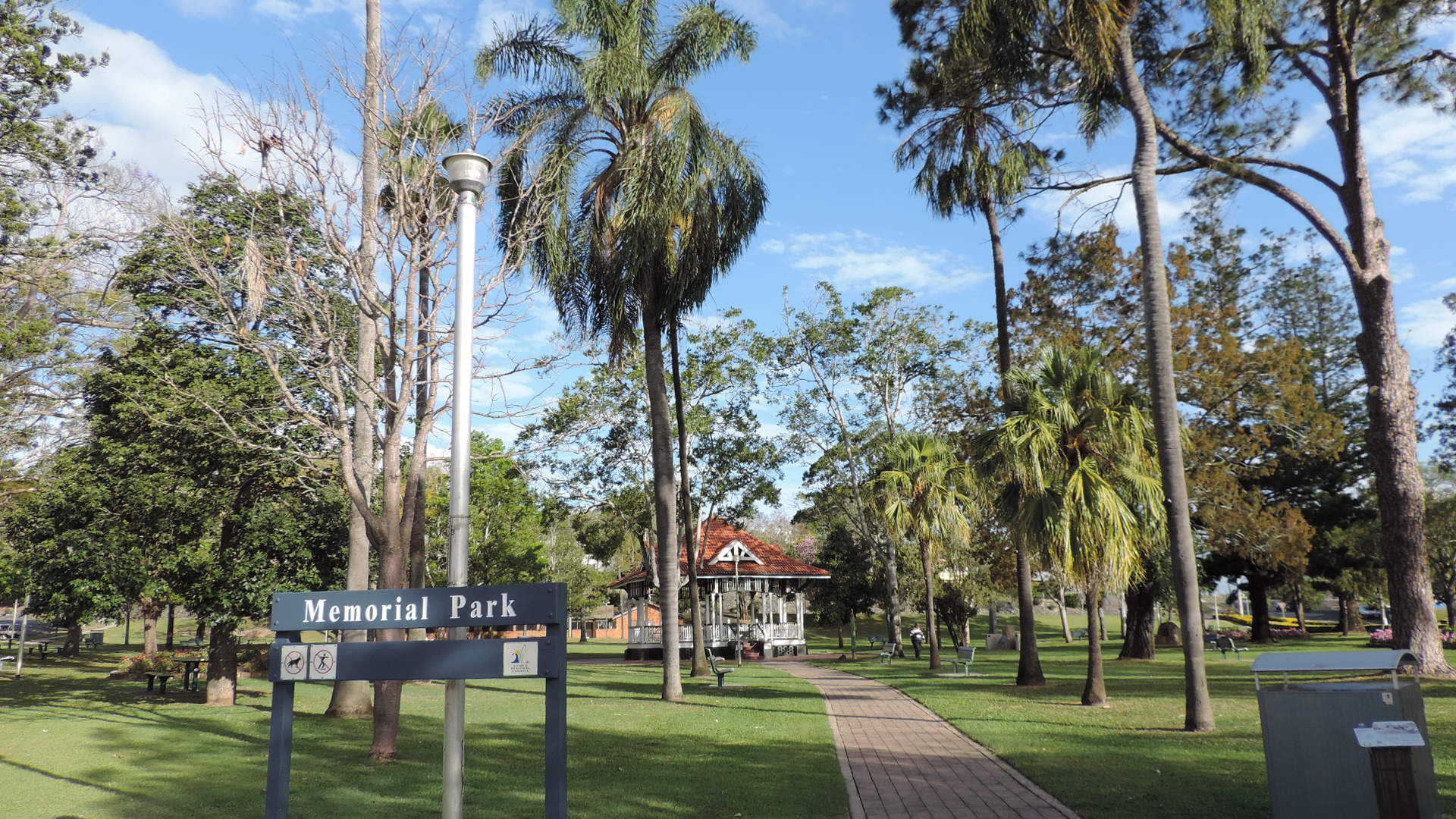
- Gympie Memorial Park, 2015

- Location within Queensland Location within Australia
- 26.1909°S 152.6611°E
- Location: River Road, Gympie, Gympie Region, Queensland, Australia

History
- Design period: 1919–1930s (interwar period)
- Built: 1919–1921

Site notes
- Architect(s): Harry Moore, Alfred Herbert Foster

Queensland Heritage Register
- Official name: Memorial Park
- Type: state heritage (landscape, built)
- Designated: 18 September 2009
- Reference no.: 602729
- Significant period: 1920s
- Significant components: trees/plantings, bandstand/rotunda, garden – layout, tree groups – avenue of, memorial/monument, garden – bed/s, flagpole/flagstaff, memorial – park, pathway/walkway, memorial – plaque, memorial – rotunda, memorial – rock/stone/boulder

Gympie Memorial Park is a heritage-listed memorial at River Road, Gympie, Gympie Region, Queensland, Australia. It was designed by Harry Moore and Alfred Herbert Foster and built from 1919 to 1921. It was added to the Queensland Heritage Register on 18 September 2009.

== History ==
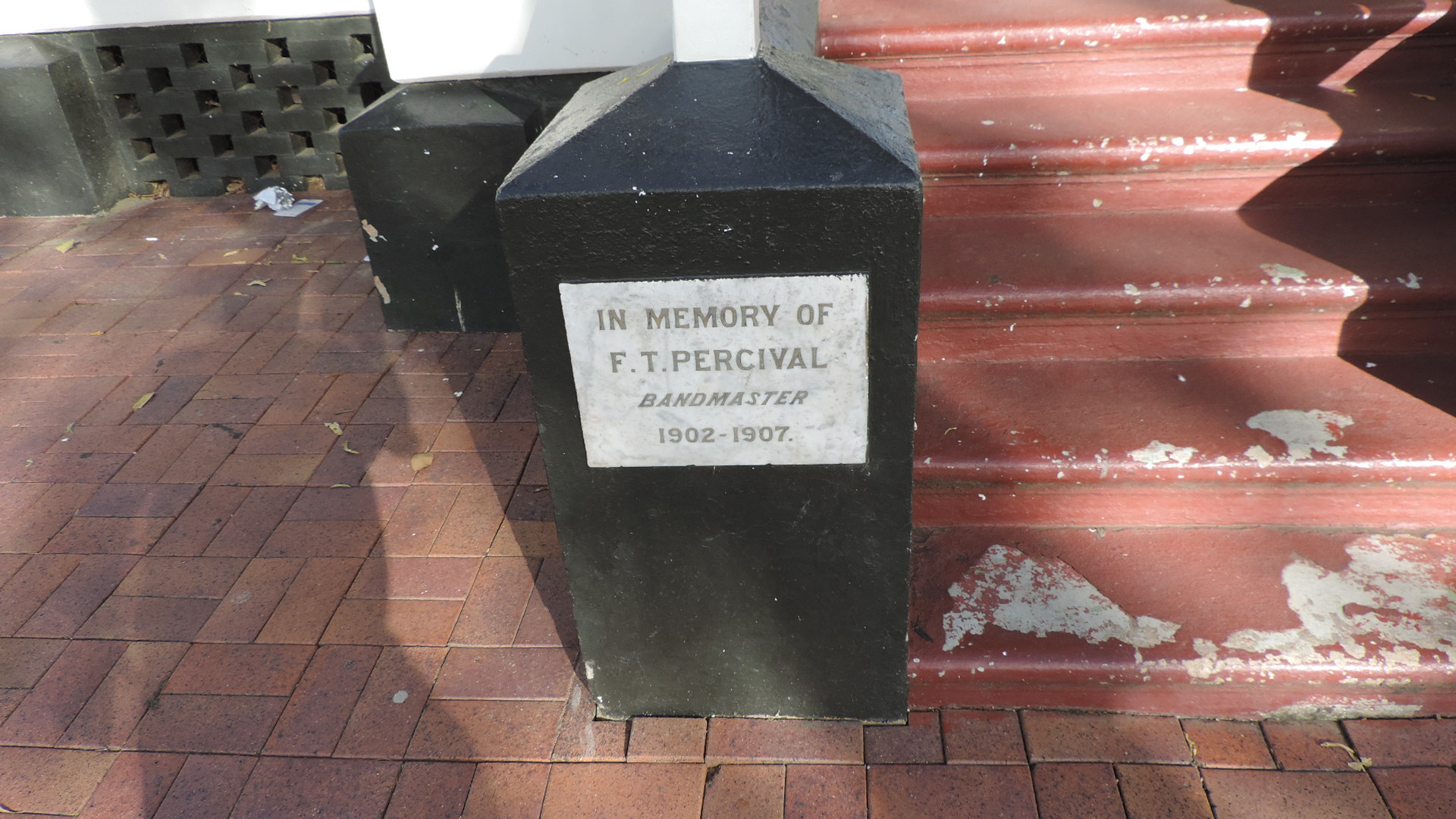
Memorial plaque for bandmaster Frederick Thomas Percival, 2015

Gympie Memorial Park was established in 1919–1921 as the Gympie and Widgee District Fallen Soldiers' Memorial Park, with a landscape design prepared by Brisbane's Parks Superintendent Henry (Harry) Moore and a focal timber bandstand designed by Brisbane City Council's architect Alfred Herbert Foster. The park was opened on 20 April 1921 but the first official function in the park was an address to His Royal Highness Edward, Prince of Wales, during the Prince's visit to Gympie on 3 August 1920. Funded largely by community subscription and built on land donated by the Henderson family, owners of Ferguson & Co.'s Union Sawmills, the memorial park was intended as a lasting tribute to the citizens of the city and its district who had died for their country during the Great War of 1914–1918 and the Boer War of 1899–1902. The bandstand erected in the park in 1919–1920 is also a memorial to a former and much-respected local bandmaster, Frederick Thomas Percival.

The park is located in Nash's Gully in central Gympie, on the northern side of the Mary River. A little further up the gully, near the later Gympie Town Hall, James Nash had found alluvial gold in 1867, sparking Queensland's first major gold rush in October that year. The Nashville Goldfield was proclaimed and a township was established on the field to support the miners. By mid-1868 the name of the field had been changed to Gympie, reputedly an Aboriginal word for the stinging trees found in the district. The alluvial gold was worked out within 12 months, but reefs on Caledonian Hill, the Hilton, One Mile, Monkland and Two Mile were being worked from early 1868 and by the mid-1870s the township of Gympie had become the centre of one of the richest goldfields in Queensland. About 50 mining companies were still operating at Gympie in 1909, but by the 1920s output was waning. The town of Gympie acquired city status in 1905 and at the outbreak of war in 1914 was the centre of a well-populated timber-getting, sawmilling, dairying and agricultural district.

Although fought in Europe, North Africa and the Middle East, the Great War had a profound impact on Australia. In 1914 the nation retained strong ties to the "motherland" and had no hesitation in entering the war in support of Britain. Over 300,000 Australians from a population of four million volunteered for service overseas, and approximately 60,000 of these died. Almost every community in every Australian state lost young men in this war. No previous or subsequent war has had such an impact on the nation in terms of loss of life.

Even before the end of hostilities, memorials were being erected by Australian communities to honour local people who had served and died during this international conflict. These memorials were a spontaneous and highly visible expression of national grief. To those who erected them, they were as sacred as grave sites. With British policy decreeing that the Empire war dead were to be buried where they fell, war memorials became substitute graves for the Australians whose bodies lay in battlefield cemeteries overseas. Great War memorials took a variety of forms in Australia, including honour boards, stone monuments, tree-line memorial avenues, memorial parks, and utilitarian structures such as gates, halls and clocks. In Queensland the soldier statue was a popular choice of monument, while the obelisk predominated in southern states.

On 9 January 1919 a group of prominent citizens met to establish the Gympie and Widgee District Fallen Soldiers' Memorial Fund and to discuss how best to honour the community's war dead. Several alternatives were proposed, including a garden, a park, a scholarship and a stone "digger" monument. On behalf of his family – and as a tribute to his father William Henderson, who was one of the founders of Ferguson & Co.'s Union Sawmills in Gympie in 1868 – Arthur Henderson offered as a site for a memorial park, a triangular parcel of land bounded by River Road and Reef and Young streets in Nash's Gully, in the heart of Gympie. This was Machine Area 12, occupied by the Union Sawmills until they moved to Nashville on the outskirts of Gympie in 1917.

There were two main difficulties with the site offered by Henderson: there was no direct access from Mary Street (Gympie's principal commercial thoroughfare); and it lay below the flood mark. Gympie had a long history of severe inundation from the Mary River, with flood levels having reached 25.45 metres (83.5 ft) in 1893 and 22 metres (72 ft) in 1898. The meeting suggested that Brisbane City Council's Parks Superintendent, Harry Moore be asked to advise. A horticulturalist and landscape gardener, Moore had been appointed as Brisbane's first Parks Superintendent in September 1912, a position he held until the early 1940s, and in 1914 had created the much-admired New Farm Park in Brisbane. In annual Mayor reports, Moore was thanked for his work in beautifying the parks and gardens of Brisbane, and his services were lent to Stephens Shire in 1916 to prepare a design for the Yeronga Memorial Park (constructed 1917–1921).

By early February 1919 Moore had visited Gympie and reported on a number of proposed sites for a park or garden. He favoured the former sawmill site if access from Mary Street could be arranged, and if he could be assured that no serious damage from flooding would result.

Public debate over the nature of the memorial to be established, and whether to accept the Henderson family's offer, continued in the local press and at public meetings for well over two months. The Gympie Sub-Branch of the Returned Soldiers and Sailors Imperial League of Australia (RSSILA) supported the sawmill site, if access from Mary Street could be obtained. After the Henderson family made available an additional strip of land between Mary and Reef streets, with a 31-foot (9.4 m) frontage to Mary Street, their offer was accepted at a public meeting held on 26 March 1919. A park in the centre of the city would be a permanent memorial to the district's fallen soldiers; of benefit to the community; and an attraction to visitors.

By mid-July 1919 work on clearing and levelling the site had commenced. Over the next months buildings and fences associated with the former sawmill were dismantled and money received from the sale of the timber in these structures was put toward forming and improving the park. Over the following year open concrete drains at either end of the site (along Young Street and near the intersection of Reef Street and River Road) were domed, and a perimeter fence of iron-bark timber and fabric wire was constructed. The Memorial Committee employed local returned servicemen for the ground works whenever possible.

Harry Moore's services were also made available to prepare a design for the park, which he had completed by mid-July 1919. Moore had a distinctive style of layout and planting choices. He rarely used straight paths and formal, classical designs, preferring the fluidity of gently curving gravelled pedestrian walkways radiating from a few entrance points. He favoured the use of raised, dry-stone walled rockery beds with dramatic displays of flowering annuals, perennials and shrubs (roses were a particular favourite of his) in bold, massed-planting arrangements. Moore would use rockeries to line walkways, or as distinctive circular or elliptical features in open grassed lawns. For shade trees, he favoured a bold mix of palms, pines and dramatic flowering species such as poinsettias (Euphorbia pulcherrima) and jacarandas (Jacaranda mimosifolia).

In laying out the Fallen Soldiers' Memorial Park at Gympie, Moore provided a pedestrian link from Mary Street through to the southern corner of the park and River Road: "Mr Moore's idea is to continue the entrance roadway from Mary street right through to River road on the one grade, the entrance from Mary Street to the Park to be flanked by ornamental rockeries ..." (Gympie Times and Mary River Mining Gazette 15 July 1919:3). The gravelled access lane off Mary Street formed the official entrance drive to the park, with the Gympie and Widgee War Memorial Gates at the Mary Street end. Vehicles could pass through the Mary Street entrance gates along the lane to Reef Street on official occasions, but at other times access to the laneway was restricted to pedestrian traffic. At the park, Moore laid out a scheme of gently curving gravel walkways leading from perimeter gates toward a central bandstand. There were at least three perimeter gates: in Reef Street opposite the laneway leading from Mary Street; at the corner of Reef Street and River Road; and at the corner of Young Street and River Road. There may have been a fourth gate toward the eastern end of Reef Street. Access through the park to River Road was restricted to pedestrian traffic.

A 1922 photograph shows that early park plantings included an avenue of cabbage palms (Livistona australis) along the main walkway leading from the Reef Street entrance opposite the laneway off Mary Street, to the bandstand. The walkway leading from the bandstand to the corner of Young Street and River Road appears to be lined with an avenue of possibly cabbage palms alternating with pines (Conifer spp.); and the walkway from the gate at the intersection of Reef Street and River Road, which followed the River Road boundary before turning east toward the bandstand, was lined with what appear to be pine trees. Four raised, circular or elliptical garden beds were set out within open grassed areas of the park – three along the River Road side and one north of the walkway leading from Reef Street to the bandstand. Unlike the laneway rockeries, they do not appear to have been edged with stone. A few perimeter shade trees had been planted, but much of the area east of the bandstand remained an open grassy space, where seats were set out when band concerts were being performed.

In August 1919 Gympie City Council rescinded a 1917 resolution to endow the construction of a bandstand in the city's Queen's Park as a memorial to local band master FT Percival (who died in 1907), and resolved instead to provide a similar endowment for the construction of a bandstand in the Fallen Soldiers' Memorial Park. The stand was built to the same design as that prepared by AH Foster for New Farm Park, but modified to accommodate a second set of steps. Foster, an architect who joined the Brisbane City Council in 1913 as assistant to the City Engineer, was appointed City Architect in 1925 and held this position until his untimely death in 1932. His park works included bandstands at Bowen Park (1914), New Farm Park (1915), Wickham Park (1917) and Newstead Park and kiosks at Moora Park (Sandgate) and at New Farm Park (1915). The park structures he designed provided a focus and elegance that complemented Harry Moore's fluid landscape designs. Together, Moore and Foster created Brisbane's most beautiful and popular parks and gardens of the early twentieth century.

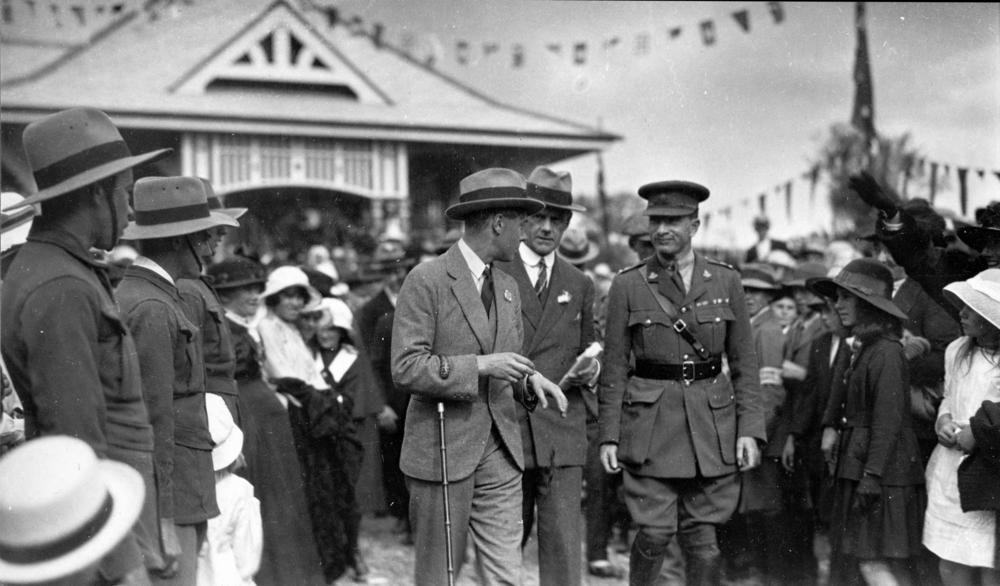
HRH Edward, Prince of Wales at the bandstand, 3 August 1920

Foster's design was for a timber-framed bandstand resting on brick piers set on a concrete base. The structure had a pyramid roof clad with fibrous-cement tiles (a very new product in Australia at that time) and was simply but effectively decorative with gablets to each side of the roof (these had shaped timber in-fills); a finial at the roof peak and at the end of each gablet; timber balustrades and valances with fretwork panels around the pavilion sides; and honeycomb brick infill between the piers. The contract was let in September 1919 to TJ Dale of Gympie, who tendered with a price of £550/13/-. Work was completed in time for the Prince of Wales' visit on 3 August 1920, when a civic address was presented to him from the bandstand. Foster also designed a lighting scheme for the park, using 1000 cp (candle power) lights at the Mary Street entrance gates and in the park, and eight lights of 130 cp each in the bandstand. At a later date, an additional set of concrete stairs was added to the east side of the bandstand, and still later (late 1960s or 1970s), the roof was re-clad with terracotta tiles.

In 1919 the Queensland Institute of Architects, on behalf of the Gympie and Widgee District Fallen Soldiers' Memorial Fund, held a design competition for memorial gates in Mary Street. George Rae, a young draftsman in the Brisbane office of Lange Powell, won the competition. The gates cost close to £1000 and were completed about August 1920. Plaques on the gateposts recorded the names of 167 local men who died during service in the Great War (1914–1918) and of the two who fell in the Boer War (1899–1902). The memorial gates and laneway are the subject of a separate entry in the Queensland heritage register (Gympie and Widgee War Memorial Gates).

The Gympie and Widgee District Fallen Soldier's Memorial Park was handed over to the Gympie City Council on 9 February 1921 and was opened officially on 20 April 1921 by senator Major-General Sir Thomas William Glasgow, formerly of Gympie, who had led the Australian re-capture of the French town of Villiers-Bretonneux from German troops on the night of 24 April 1918 and turned the war in favour of the allies. The opening coincided with a "carnival and continental cafe" in the park conducted by the RSSILA to raise funds for improving their hall in nearby Reef Street, and attracted a crowd of over 2,000. The memorial park, bandstand and gates had cost just over £5,500 and was opened free of debt.

The status of the park was formalised when on 2 December 1921 an area of 3 acres (1.2 ha) 2 roods 20 perches (2,500 m^{2}), comprising former Machine Area 12 and adjacent parts of Reef Street and River Road, was proclaimed as a Reserve for Soldiers' Memorial Park, and the Council of the City of Gympie proclaimed as Trustee on 24 December 1921.

In the 1920s the Gympie City Council spent a further £660 on the erection of a fernery and public lavatories in the park. Neither of these facilities survives.

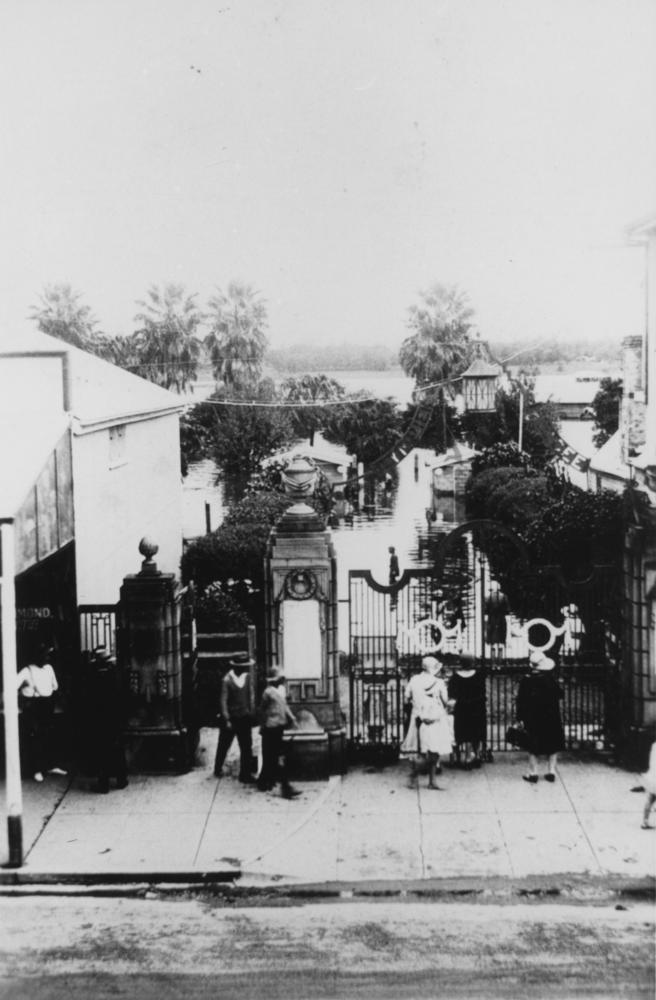
Gympie Memorial Park in flood, 1931

Concerns about flooding were well-founded as the park was flooded on many occasions including 1927, 1931 and 1954.

During World War II (1939–1945) the Gympie City Council constructed underground air-raid shelters in the memorial park, adjacent to the band rotunda. These shelters had timber walling, like mine shafts, and a timber roof over which about half a metre of soil was laid, and each could accommodate 20 to 30 people. After the war, the shelters were dismantled.

In the 1950s the Council constructed a brick nursery and fernery along the Young Street side of the park. This may have incorporated an earlier brick structure on the site.

Reef Street became the principal vehicular access to the park. In 1938 an attempt was made to retrieve sections of the former Reef Street road reserve that had been incorporated into the memorial park in 1921, for car parking purposes. The local sub-branch of the RSSILA took an active interest in protecting the site as a memorial and initially viewed any reduction in the area of the park to be a "violation", but in late 1944 agreed to Council's plan to remove the fence along Reef Street to provide additional car parking, ease traffic congestion along the street, and create "an open and more attractive boundary to the park on this side" (Gympie Times 5 December 1944). Eventually all the perimeter fencing to the park was removed, although that along Young Street was still in existence c. 1959. From 2004 a number of small excisions along the boundaries of the park were made for road widening purposes, the area of the park in August 2009 being 1.394 hectares (3.44 acres).

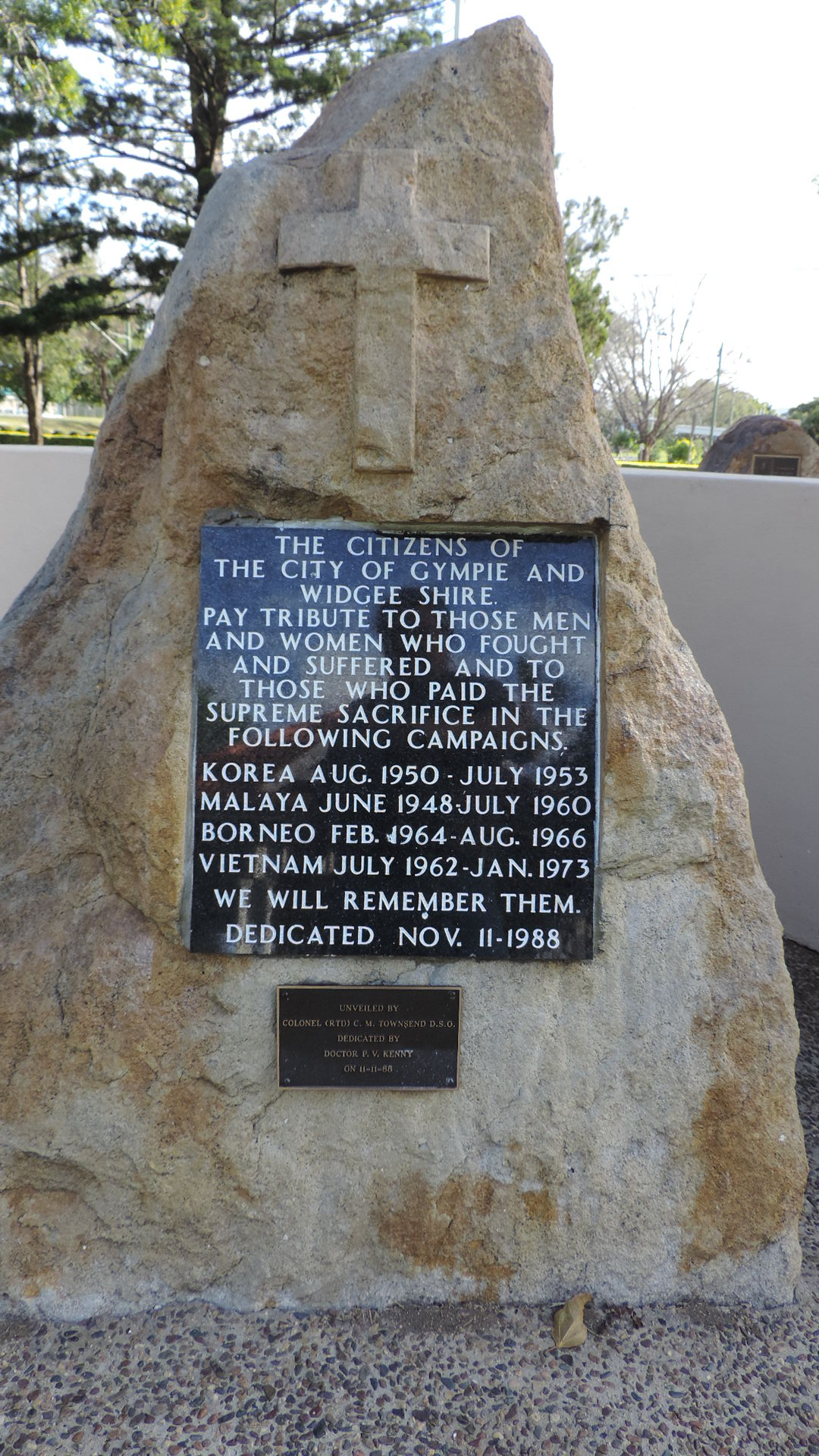
Memorial to those who served in the Korean, Malaya, Borneo and Vietnam campaigns, 2015

Other memorials have been placed in the park since its establishment as a World War I memorial. Circa 1939 the sandstone and marble memorial fountain honouring the discoverer of gold at Gympie, James Nash, was relocated from near the Town Hall to the memorial park, close to the intersection of Reef Street and River Road. At this time the drinking fountain function was lost, and the upper section with sandstone urn and finials was removed. On Armistice Day 1988, a memorial stone in the park was dedicated to the citizens of Gympie and Widgee Shire who had served in military campaigns in Korea (August 1950-July 1953); Malaya/Malaysia (June 1948-July 1960), Borneo (February 1964-August 1966) and Vietnam (July 1962-January 1973).

In 2013, the Gympie Regional Council proposed the construction of a $22.7 million levee to protect the CBD area (including the Memorial Park) from future flooding. However, the proposal relies on obtaining state and federal funding.

The Soldiers' Memorial Park (now generally referred to simply as the Memorial Park) remains a focus for annual Anzac Day (25 April) and Remembrance Day (11 November) events and a popular local pedestrian park, especially during weekday lunch hours.

== Description ==
Gympie Memorial Park is located just south of the central business district along Mary Street, on a low-lying triangle of ground that occupies the whole of the block bounded by Reef Street to the north, Young Street to the south-east and River Road to the south-west. Linked with Mary Street via a walkway that contains the heritage-listed Gympie and Widgee War Memorial Gates, the park is an attractive green space in the heart of town. Consisting of lawns, circular and oval rose garden beds, paved walkways and a wide variety of mature trees, it retains much of its original form and continues to accommodate many of the functions carried out there since its establishment. A 1920 memorial timber bandstand in the centre of the park is the most visually dominant structure on the site. More discreetly placed is a 1950s brick fernery building, built into the steep bank along the Young Street boundary, which appears to contain elements of an earlier brick structure. A number of other memorials have been placed throughout the park, including a large sandstone monument dedicated to James Nash, which occupies a prominent position near the corner of Reef Street and River Road. Recent signage, bench seating, picnic tables, garbage bins and two children's playgrounds are not considered to be of cultural heritage significance.

The park retains much of its original layout design, the key elements of which are the bandstand, walkways, garden beds and trees. The bandstand is located close to the centre of the park and orientated to the north-west. From this central feature, walkways branch out to the south, east and north-west, the latter connecting to the Memorial Gates walkway from Mary Street. At least two of these walkways, those branching to the north-west and south, were part of the 1920 design and have avenues of trees on either side. The walkway to the east also may be part of the original design, and is lined with trees. A later walkway crosses the park north to south, linking the Memorial Gates walkway with River Road. All the walkways through the park are paved.

Despite their recent concrete and block edging, four garden beds in the park (one elliptical shaped, three circular) appear to be of the same dimensions and in the same positions as the garden beds established in 1920. Three are placed in a line parallel to the River Street boundary in the western half of the park, with circular beds at either end and the elliptical bed in the centre. The fourth and largest circular garden bed sits to the north of the bandstand near the Reef Street boundary. All four beds are planted with roses in 2009.

The variety and number of planted mature trees is a distinctive characteristic of the park. These include trees planted around the park perimeter, creating a green screen that varies in density depending on the tree species used. Some, such as several hoop pines (Araucaria cunninghamii) appear, by their size, to be very mature and may date from the earliest planting schemes. Apart from hoop pines, perimeter plantings consist mainly of Jacarandas (Jacaranda mimosifolia), brown pines (Podocarpus elatus), crow's ash (Flindersia australis) and kauri pine (Agathis robusta). Early trees can also be found in the avenues planted along walkways that exist from the original park layout. The avenue linking the bandstand to the Memorial Gates walkway has queen palms (Syagrus romanzoffiana), cabbage palms (Livistona australis) and Chinese fan palms (Livistona chinensis), some of which appear to be evident in early photographs. The avenue running south from the bandstand to the corner of River Road and Young Street contains paired bumpy ash (Flindersia schottiana) trees, alternated with various species of palm. Lining the walkway heading east from the bandstand are paired Jacarandas and other trees including a large weeping fig (Ficus benjamina). Other individual and grouped specimen trees are found throughout the park. Some notable examples are a large slash pine (Pinus elliottii (Pinus caribaea)) west of the bandstand, a line of silky oaks (Grevillea robusta) through the eastern lawn area and a mature Illawarra flame tree (Brachychiton acerifolius) in the north-west corner of the park.

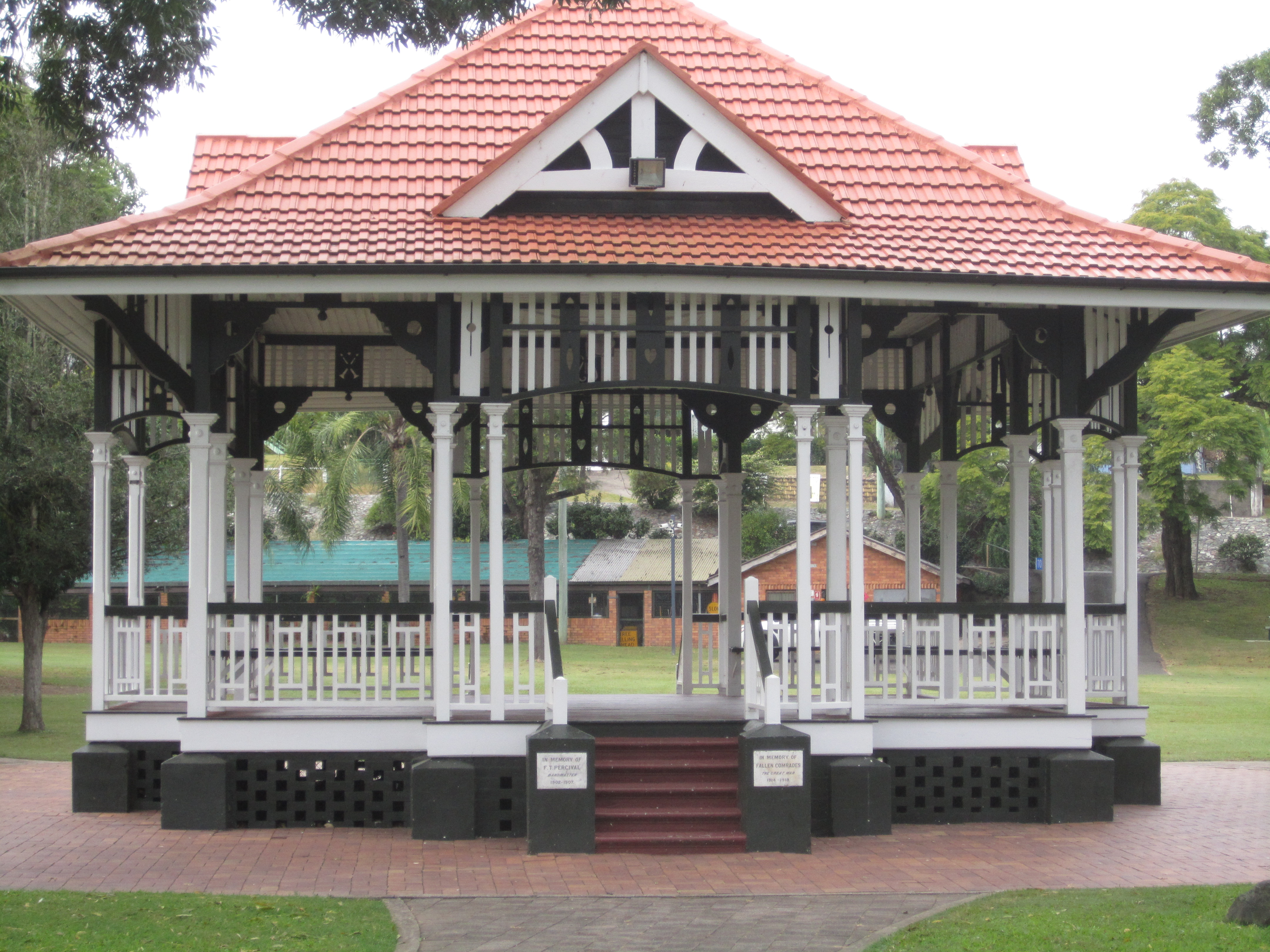
Bandstand, 2012

The 1920 bandstand is a free-standing, elevated, timber-framed pavilion. The square, broken-back hipped roof has small gable projections on all four sides and is clad in concrete tiles. Each gablet has a bargeboard and decorative timber screens. The roof is supported by square timber posts that have decorated tops and ornamental brackets. A timber frieze (featuring a harp and a crossed horns motif) sits under the roof, running between each post. The timber board-lined ceiling, consisting of four triangular panels joined with cover strips, falls gently towards the centre of the pavilion. The bandstand plan is essentially square, with fixed timber corner benches and narrow, rectangular bays projecting out from all four sides. A timber balustrade encompasses the whole, in-filled with a combination of timber balusters and some metal replacement sections. The platform floor is timber board-lined and accessed by concrete steps to the north-west and south-east. The steps on the main (north-west) facade are narrower and have a marble memorial plaque attached to the concrete piers on either side. The one on the left states "In Memory of F. T. Percival, Bandmaster, 1902–1907" while the other is inscribed "In Memory of Fallen Comrades, The Great War, 1914–1918". The structure stands on concrete piers that are connected by panels of honeycombed brickwork. The ground immediately around the bandstand is paved and linked to the three paved walkways that branch out from here.

The 1950s fernery building is constructed from orange bricks and consists of an enclosed storage room at the south-east end and a long, open air enclosure used for growing ferns and other plants. The storage shed at the south-west end has a timber framed gable roof, clad in corrugated iron. The walls are brick and appear to encase remnants of an earlier brick-on-edge structure with decorative lintels above the north-west-facing openings, made of bricks standing on end and angled. The fernery enclosure has a skillion roof with steel truss framing, clad primarily with steel caging panels and shade cloth. The fernery walls are solid brickwork up to waist height with brick piers supporting the roof structure. Window openings between the piers are in-filled with steel caging panels. Two doorways open onto the park, one at either end. The north-east end of the fernery has small, flat roofed, block work extension.

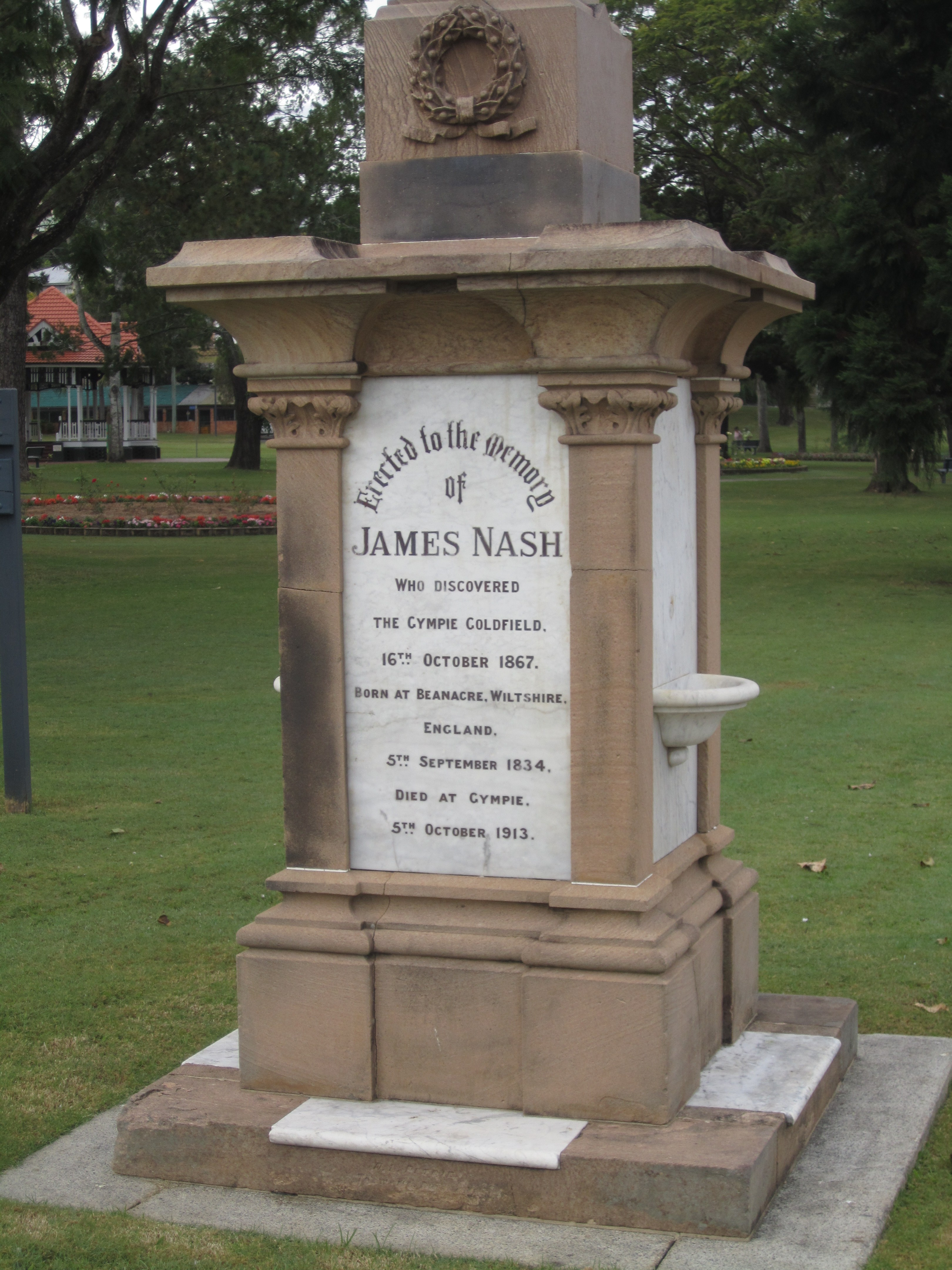
James Nash Memorial, 2012

Of the other memorials positioned around the park, the sandstone and marble monument to James Nash is the most prominent. It stands in the north-west corner of the park, facing the intersection of Reef Street, River Road and Monkland Street. Designed in a classical style, it has a square base, Corinthian-order pilasters at each corner, a wide cornice, and is topped by a sandstone block ornamented with a carved wreath. Marble panels are fixed between each pilaster; two have projecting marble basins and one is inscribed with the words "Erected to the Memory of James Nash, who discovered the Gympie goldfield, 16th October 1867. Born at Beanacre, Wiltshire, England, 5th September 1834. Died at Gympie 5th October 1913." West of the bandstand is a "Peace Pole" memorial that has one plaque attached to a decorated timber pole and another on a rock at its base. Aligned with the bandstand to the south-west is a 1988 War Memorial, which consists of a large sandstone boulder with a small cross carved in relief, a large granite plaque and a small brass plaque below it. A low, semi-circular concrete masonry wall surrounds the boulder and has two brass plaques on its inner face, commemorating the deaths of individual soldiers. A nearby flagpole associated with this memorial stands to the north-west.

The low-lying position of the park and the density of trees planted around its edge focus views within and through the park, rather than out from it. Glimpses of the park in its treed setting can be obtained from a number of surrounding streets to the north and from Calton Hill adjacent to the south-east.

== Heritage listing ==
Gympie Memorial Park was listed on the Queensland Heritage Register on 18 September 2009 having satisfied the following criteria.

The place is important in demonstrating the evolution or pattern of Queensland's history.

The Memorial Park was established in 1919–1921 as a lasting tribute to citizens of Gympie and its district who had died for their country during the Great War of 1914–1918 and to the two who had fallen during the Boer War of 1899–1902. As part of a spontaneous outpouring of national grief at the loss of 60,000 Australians during the Great War of 1914–1918, the Memorial Park contributed to the nation-building of Australia in the early twentieth century and remains important in demonstrating a significant aspect of Queensland's history.

The place is important in demonstrating the principal characteristics of a particular class of cultural places.

The Memorial Park at Gympie remains among the most intact of the early twentieth century collaborative efforts of landscape designer Henry (Harry) Moore and architect AH Foster in creating popular public parks and gardens. As employees of the Brisbane City Council and associated principally with Brisbane, the fact that Moore and Foster were invited to design the park layout and bandstand at Gympie is testament to the popularity and wider influence of their work at this period.

The best Brisbane examples of the work of Moore and Foster survive at New Farm Park (1914) and in elements of the 1914 re-design of Bowen Park. Neither remains as true to Moore's design concept as the Memorial Park at Gympie, which retains early design elements including: the connection between the laneway off Mary Street and the Memorial Park; the arrangement of the main walkways radiating from a central focal point occupied by a decorative timber bandstand; the circular and elliptical raised garden beds; and early tree plantings. The substantially intact, timber bandstand designed by AH Foster is an excellent example both of a park bandstand of this era in Queensland, and of Foster's design abilities.

The place is important because of its aesthetic significance.

The park possesses beautiful attributes, due to: the careful composition of early elements (such as the bandstand, walkways, garden beds and trees) associated with the original park layout; sightlines and views through the park (with the bandstand as the central focus); the avenues of mature trees containing a variety of species; and the sense of enclosure and calm created by perimeter plantings that screen the park from commercial development surrounding it.

The place has a strong or special association with a particular community or cultural group for social, cultural or spiritual reasons.

The place has a strong and special association for Gympie and district as the focus for public commemorative events at annual Anzac and Remembrance days.
