= Gympie and Widgee War Memorial Gates =

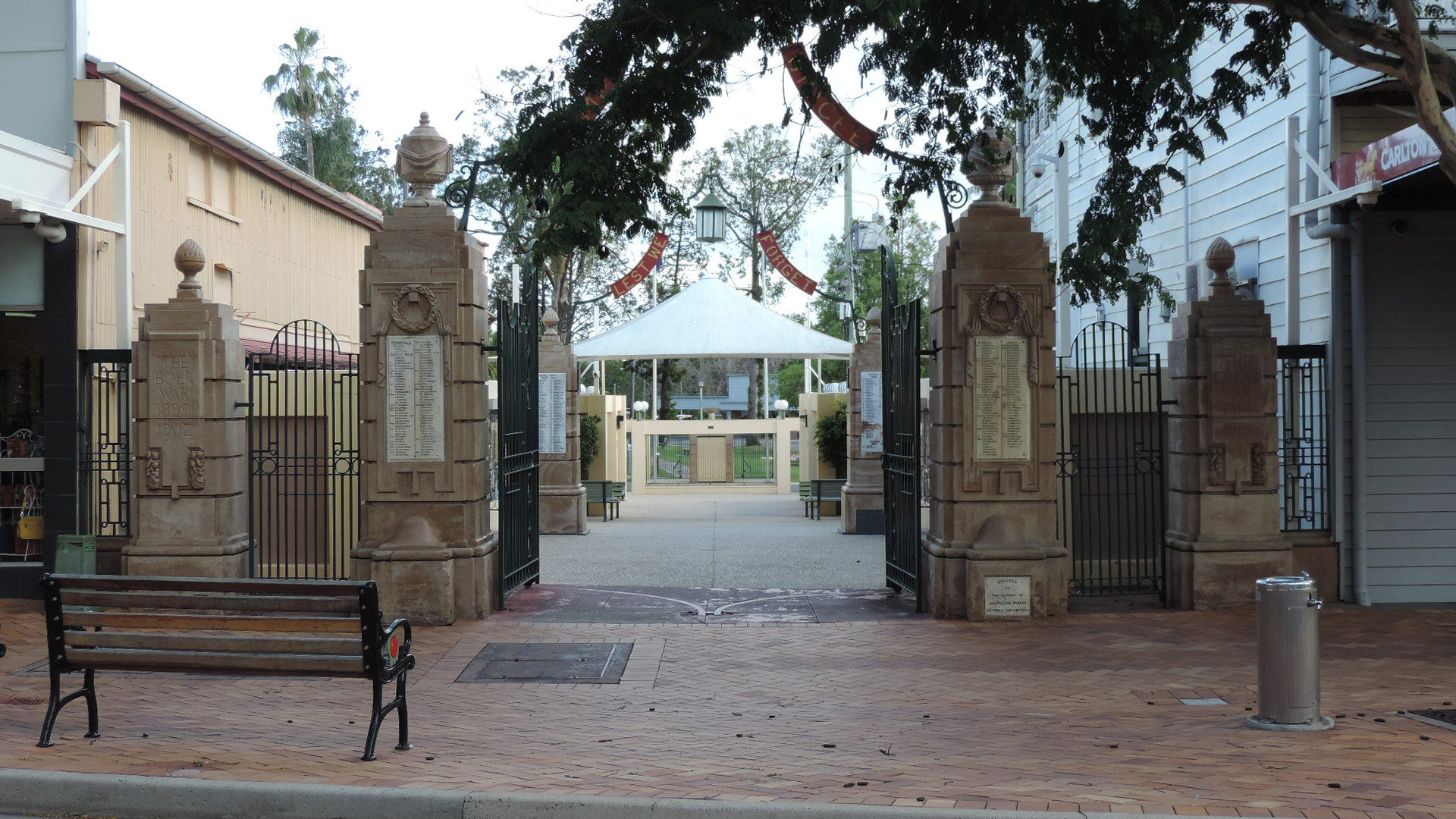
- Gympie and Widgee War Memorial Gates, 2015

- Location within Queensland Location within Australia
- 26.19°S 152.6609°E
- Location: Mary Street, Gympie, Gympie Region, Queensland, Australia

History
- Design period: 1919–1930s (interwar period)
- Built: 1920

Site notes
- Architect: George Rae

Queensland Heritage Register
- Official name: Gympie and Widgee War Memorial Gates
- Type: state heritage (built)
- Designated: 21 October 1992
- Reference no.: 600535
- Significant period: 1920– (social); 1920 (historical, fabric)
- Significant components: memorial – park, memorial – gate/s
- Builders: A L Petrie & Son

Gympie and Widgee War Memorial Gates is a heritage-listed memorial at Mary Street, Gympie, Gympie Region, Queensland, Australia. The gates provide an entranceway on Mary Street (the main street of Gympie) through to the Gympie Memorial Park in Reef Street. The gates were designed by George Rae and built in 1920 by A L Petrie & Son. It was added to the Queensland Heritage Register on 21 October 1992.

== History ==
The Gympie War Memorial Gates were unveiled in 1920 by Edward, Prince of Wales. The gates were designed by George Rae, of Brisbane. Monumental masonry firm A L Petrie and Son of Toowong undertook the stonework whilst an unknown local blacksmith produced the ironwork. The memorial honours the 167 local men who fell in the First World War and the two who fell in the Boer War. The gates were unveiled on 3 August 1920.

The township of Gympie was established after the discovery of gold by James Nash in 1867. This was the beginning of the first large goldrush in Queensland, and the town developed to support and supply the prospectors who came to the area.

In 1919 the Queensland Institute of Architects held a design competition for a memorial on behalf of the Gympie and Widgee District Soldiers' Memorial Fund. George Rae, then a young draftsman in the Brisbane office of Lange Powell won the competition. He also won the competition for the design of the Toowong War Memorial in Brisbane.

George Rae was born in Glasgow, Scotland and arrived in Brisbane in 1914. Between 1919 and 1922, he was articled to architect L L Powell. He left to travel to Sydney and worked as a draftsman in various offices until 1924. Whilst in Sydney, he studied at Sydney Technical College and also with Professor Leslie Wilkinson. Returning to Brisbane in 1924, he again worked with L L Powell, firstly as chief draftsman and then as an associate. He became a registered architect in Queensland in 1929.

The masons, A L Petrie and Son were the largest monumental masonry firm in Queensland at this time and were responsible for many First World War memorials throughout the state.

The Henderson family donated their Union saw mill site for the Gympie Memorial Park and additional land was acquired at a later date. One of the objections was that the memorial park site was not on Mary Street, the main street of Gympie, but on the street behind it, Reef Street. So the Hendersons also donated land with a 31 feet (9.4 m) frontage from Mary Street through to Reef Street to create a passageway to the memorial park. The memorial gates stand on Mary Street at the entrance to the passageway.

The cost for the gates was £800 and although the memorial was for the whole of the Widgee Shire, the funds were raised primarily by public subscription and the Gympie City Council.

Australia, and Queensland in particular, had few civic monuments before the First World War. The memorials erected in its wake became our first national monuments, recording the devastating impact of the war on a young nation. Australia lost 60 000 from a population of about 4 million, representing one in five of those who served. No previous or subsequent war has made such an impact on the nation.

Even before the end of the war, memorials became a spontaneous and highly visible expression of national grief. To those who erected them, they were as sacred as grave sites, substitute graves for the Australians whose bodies lay in battlefield cemeteries in Europe and the Middle East. British policy decreed that the Empire war dead were to be buried where they fell. The word "cenotaph", commonly applied to war memorials at the time, literally means "empty tomb".

Australian war memorials are distinctive in that they commemorate not only the dead. Australians were proud that their first great national army, unlike other belligerent armies, was composed entirely of volunteers, men worthy of honour whether or not they made the supreme sacrifice. Many memorials honour all who served from a locality, not just the dead, providing valuable evidence of community involvement in the war. Such evidence is not readily obtainable from military records, or from state or national listings, where names are categorised alphabetically or by military unit.

Australian war memorials are also valuable evidence of imperial and national loyalties, at the time, not seen as conflicting; the skills of local stonemasons, metalworkers and architects; and of popular taste. In Queensland, the soldier statue was the popular choice of memorial, whereas the obelisk predominated in the southern states, possibly a reflection of Queensland's larger working-class population and a lesser involvement of architects.

Many of the First World War monuments have been updated to record local involvement in later conflicts, and some have fallen victim to unsympathetic re-location and repair.

== Description ==
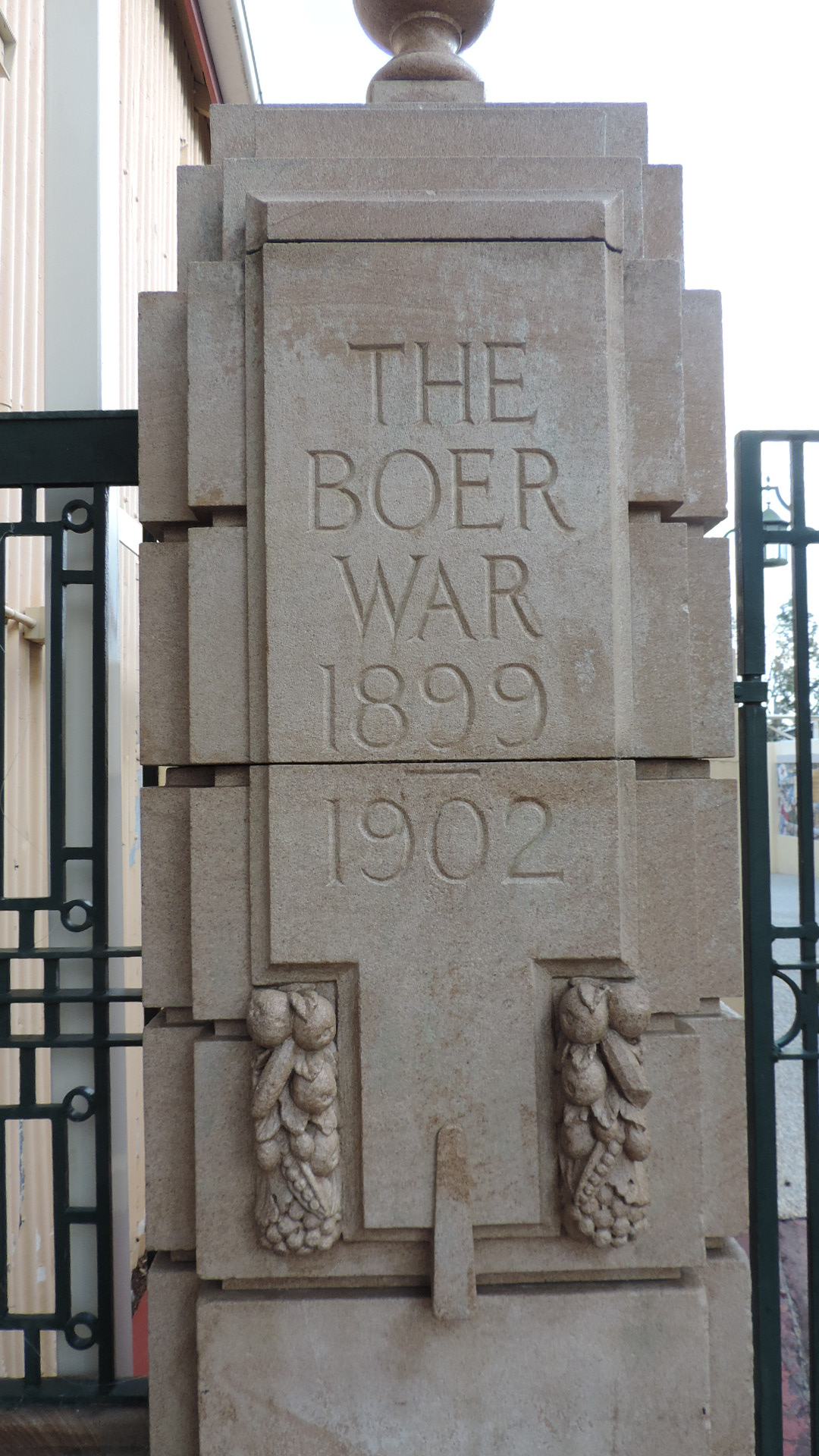
Boer War pillar, 2015

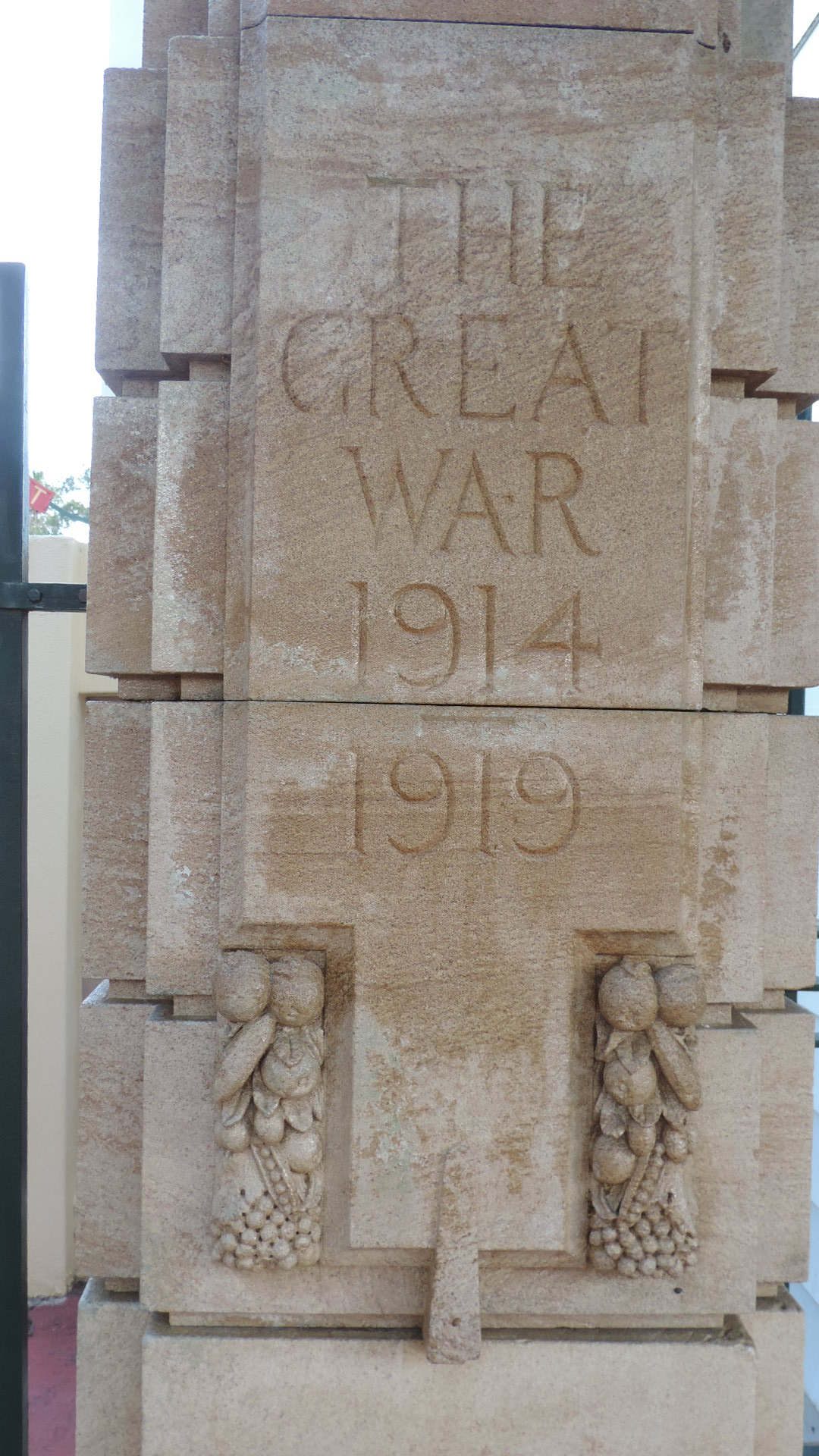
Great War pillar, 2015

The First World War Memorial Gates are situated in Mary Street, Gympie. They are located at the entrance to a block of land which stretches from Mary Street to Reef Street. The gates are flanked by a hotel on one side and a shop on the other, forming a walkway to the Gympie Memorial Park behind. The area between the two buildings is paved with planting down each side. Brick toilet blocks are located at the Reef Street end.

The Gates comprise two large and two small sandstone pillars with wrought iron swing gates and a wrought iron ornamental arch supporting a central lantern. An identical set of the smaller pillars are located in the walkway behind, also with an ornamental arch and lantern.

The inner pair of pillars on the main gate are larger than the outer pair, however all four pillars have the same basic structure with differences in detailing.

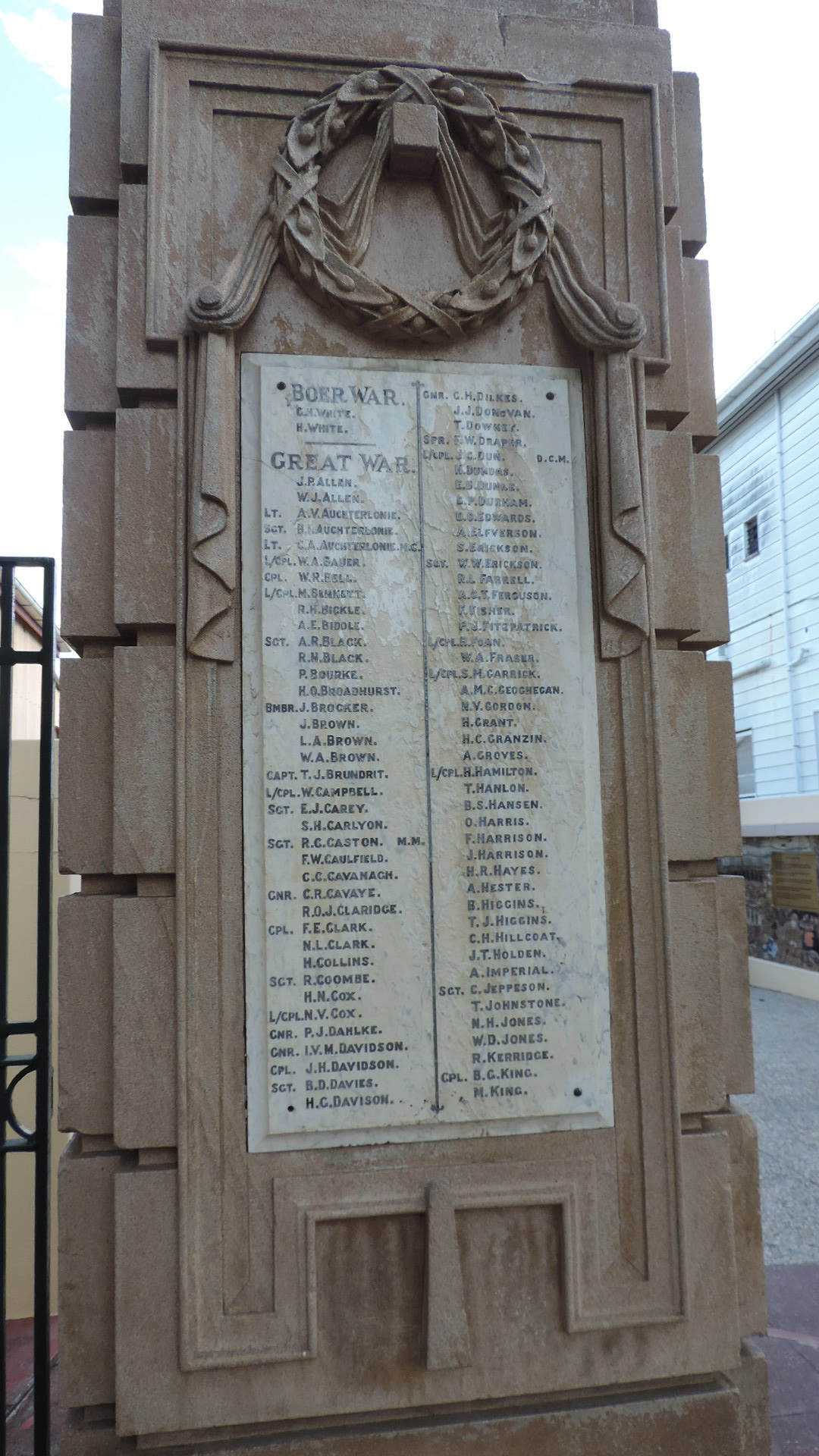
Names of the fallen in the Boer War and World War I (left-hand side), 2015

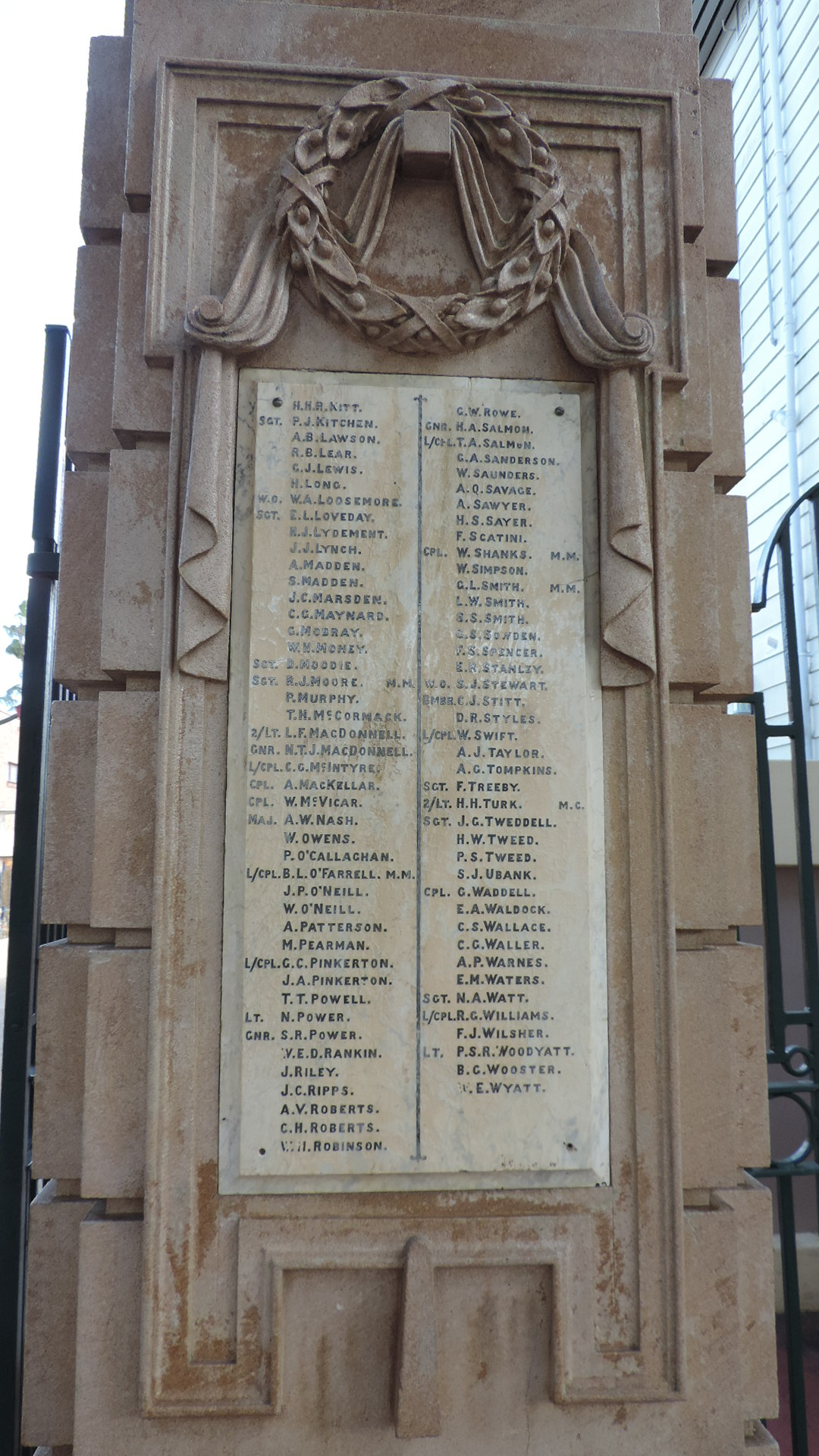
Names of the fallen in the World War I (right-hand side), 2015

All pillars sit on a substantial plinth capped by a torus moulding. From this rises a shaft of banded sandstone which culminates in a stepped element. The entire front face of the pillar projects slightly forward.

The outer pillars are each surmounted by stylised eternal flame finials of sandstone. The front faces bear sandstone plaques with the words The Great War and appropriate dates on the western side and The Boer War and appropriate dates on the eastern side. The lower sides of each plaque is embellished with relief carved festoons of tropical fruit.

The inner pillars are the same standard design as the outer pillars, but at a larger scale. They are surmounted by large urns, draped with swags. The front faces display marble plaques with leaded names of the local Fallen Heroes from the Boer and First World Wars. Above each plate are relief carved laurel wreaths with drapery behind. At the foot of the western pillar is a marble plaque with an inscription to the memory of the fallen.

Green painted wrought iron swing gates allow vehicular traffic between the inner pillars and pedestrian traffic between these and the outer pillars. The gates have central arches at the top and simple decorative elements. Connecting the two inner pillars is an ornamental archway comprising scrollwork and scalloping and two flat plates. On one plate is the word Gympie, while on the other is the word Widgee. A decorative lantern is located at the centrepoint of the arch.

Located behind the main gates is a second set of pillars, similar in design to the main outer pillars. The front faces bear marble plaques with the leaded names of the locals men who served in the Vietnam and Second World Wars. They are joined by the same decorative arch as the front pillars and have the words Lest We Forget on the flat plates. A lantern also hangs from the centrepoint.

== Heritage listing ==
Gympie and Widgee War Memorial Gates was listed on the Queensland Heritage Register on 21 October 1992 having satisfied the following criteria.

The place is important in demonstrating the evolution or pattern of Queensland's history.

War Memorials are important in demonstrating the pattern of Queensland's history as they are representative of a recurrent theme that involved most communities throughout the state. They provide evidence of an era of widespread Australian patriotism and nationalism, particularly during and following the First World War.

The place demonstrates rare, uncommon or endangered aspects of Queensland's cultural heritage.

This particular memorial is rare as it also commemorates those who fell in the Boer War.

The place is important in demonstrating the principal characteristics of a particular class of cultural places.

The monuments manifest a unique documentary record and are demonstrative of popular taste in the inter-war period.

Unveiled in 1920, the Memorial at Gympie demonstrates the principal characteristics of a commemorative structure erected as an enduring record of a major historical event. This is achieved through the use of appropriate materials and design elements.

The place is important because of its aesthetic significance.

As part of the Memorial Park, the Memorial Gates contribute to the aesthetic qualities of the townscape. They are also of aesthetic significance for their high degree of workmanship and design.

The place has a strong or special association with a particular community or cultural group for social, cultural or spiritual reasons.

The Memorial Gates have a strong and continuing association with the community as evidence of the impact of a major historic event and as the focal point for the remembrance of that event.

The place has a special association with the life or work of a particular person, group or organisation of importance in Queensland's history.

They also have special association with Brisbane architect George Rae as an early example of his work, and with Brisbane masonry firm, A L Petrie and Son.
