= George Rae (footballer) =

Scottish footballer

Personal information
- Date of birth: October 1888
- Place of birth: Falkirk, Scotland
- Position: Forward

Senior career*
Years	Team	Apps	(Gls)
–1908	Falkirk Athletic		
1908–1910	Falkirk		
1910–1913	Hibernian	66	(14)
1913	Kirkcaldy United		
1913–1914	Partick Thistle	12	(0)
1914–1919	Dunfermline Athletic	20	(4)
1919–1920	Falkirk	2	(0)
1920–1921	Dumbarton	11	(0)
- * Club domestic league appearances and goals

George Rae was a Scottish professional footballer who played in the Scottish League for Hibernian, Dunfermline Athletic, Dumbarton, Partick Thistle and Falkirk as a forward.

== Personal life ==
Rae served in the Royal Warwickshire Regiment during the First World War and rose to the rank of temporary second lieutenant. He was awarded the Silver Medal of Military Valor.

== Career statistics ==
Appearances and goals by club, season and competition
Club	Season	League			Scottish Cup		Total	
Club	Season	Division	Apps	Goals	Apps	Goals	Apps	Goals
Hibernian	1909–10	Scottish First Division	2	0	0	0	1	0
Hibernian	1910–11	Scottish First Division	21	4	1	1	22	5
Hibernian	1911–12	Scottish First Division	27	8	2	1	29	9
Hibernian	1912–13	Scottish First Division	16	2	5	1	21	3
Hibernian	Total		66	14	8	3	74	17
Partick Thistle	1913–14	Scottish First Division	12	0	0	0	12	0
Dunfermline Athletic	1914–15	Scottish Second Division	20	4	1	0	21	4
Falkirk	1919–20	Scottish First Division	2	0	—		2	0
Dumbarton	1920–21	Scottish First Division	13	0	0	0	13	0
Career total			113	18	9	3	122	21

== Honours ==
Falkirk

- Stirlingshire Cup: 1909–10, 1919–20
