= Street Doctor =

- Starring: Dr Ayan Panja; Dr George Rae; Dr Barbara Murray; Dr Jonty Heaversedge; Dr Maddy Jones
- Country of origin: United Kingdom
- No. of series: 3
- No. of episodes: 22

Production
- Running time: Approximately 30 Minutes

Original release
- Network: BBC One
- Release: January 2007 – May 2008

Related
- The One Show

Street Doctor is a prime-time health series which was first shown in January 2007 on BBC One television.

The format involves four general practitioners (GPs) who take to the streets to diagnose, advise and treat people wherever they might be—at work or out and about. Locations have included high streets, ferries, restaurants, factories, markets, theatres, sports grounds, the Great North Run, race courses and the ballet.

The four GPs who appear in the show are Dr Ayan Panja, Dr Jonty Heaversedge, Dr Barbara Murray, and BMA council member Dr George Rae. They are all full-time GPs practising in the United Kingdom. The second series visited Nottingham, the Isle of Man, Manchester, London, Bristol, Bangor, Edinburgh and York, using locations such as Covent Garden and the Royal Exchange Theatre.

A spin-off from the show called Beach Doctor was also commissioned and was shown as part of BBC One's The One Show in August 2007. Street Doctor had originally been made as a pilot and was commissioned independently of The One Show despite being promoted on it in 2006.

Many elements of Street Doctor 's format have been emulated by various strands and shows on both the BBC and other channels.

The show has been estimated to attract around 4 million viewers and was re-commissioned for 2008. The third series started on Wednesday 2 April 2008 in Chester, the 9 April 2008 episode was in Sheffield, and on 16 April 2008 the doctors visited Oxford.
