= Toowong Memorial Park =

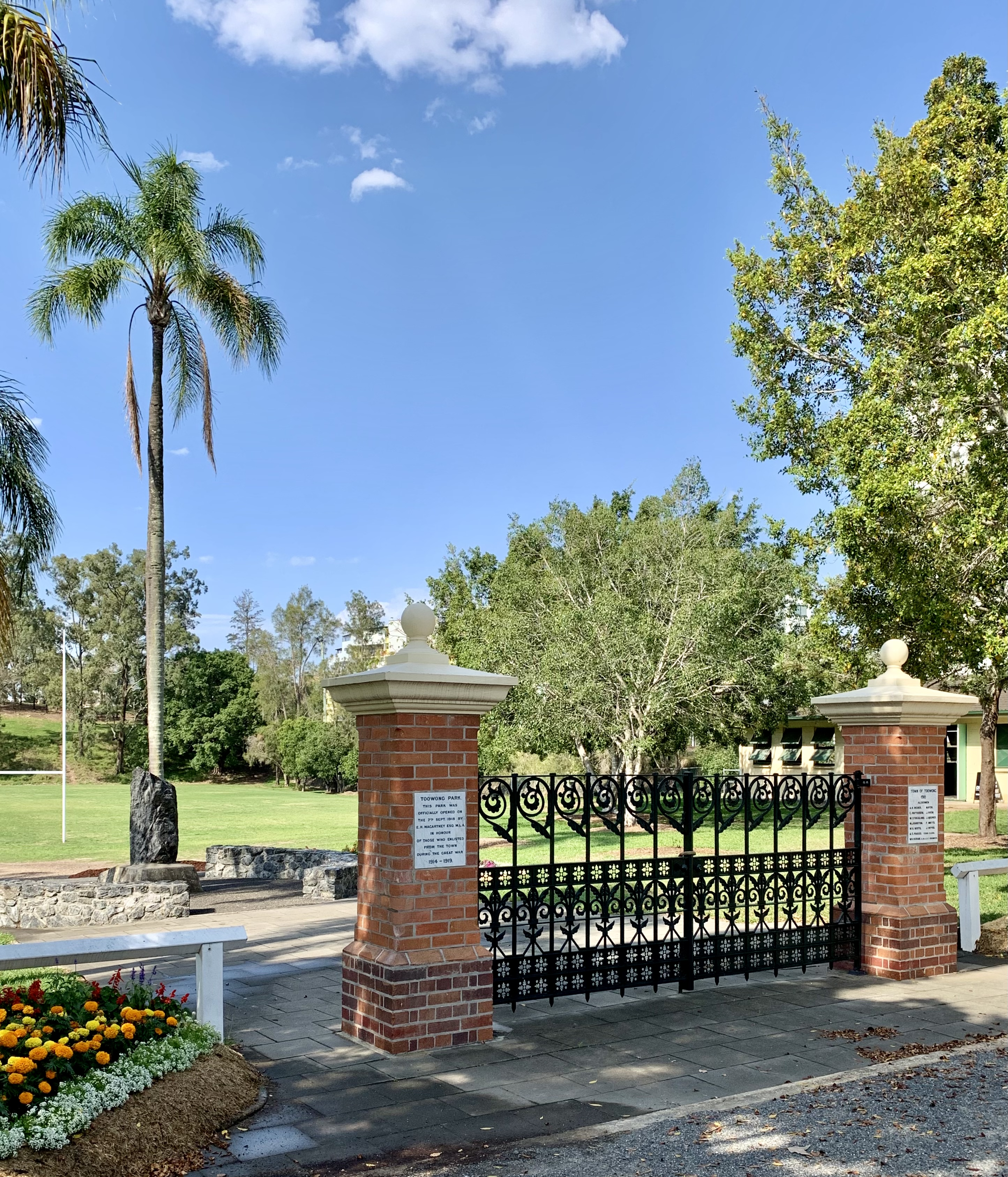
- Entrance to Toowong Memorial Park through the memorial gates, 2020

- Location within Queensland Location within Australia
- 27.4797°S 152.9938°E
- Location: 65 Sylvan Road, Toowong, City of Brisbane, Queensland, Australia

History
- Built: c. 1922

Site notes
- Architect: George Rae

Queensland Heritage Register
- Official name: Toowong Memorial Park
- Type: state heritage (landscape, built)
- Designated: 4 September 2007
- Reference no.: 602459
- Significant period: 1910s, 1920s
- Builders: Andrew Lang Petrie Monumental Works

Toowong Memorial Park is a heritage-listed memorial and park at 65 Sylvan Road, Toowong, City of Brisbane, Queensland, Australia. It was designed by George Rae and built c. 1922 by Andrew Lang Petrie Monumental Works. It was added to the Queensland Heritage Register on 4 September 2007.

== History ==
Toowong Park, bounded by the Ipswich-Brisbane Railway line to the west, Sylvan Road to the south and Dixon Street to the north, was allocated as a park in 1918 by Toowong Town Council. Following the dedication of Toowong Soldiers' Memorial in 1922, it became known as the Toowong Memorial Park. Since this time, Toowong Memorial Park has been important to the community as a central venue for Anzac Day ceremonies, organised and informal sports, and other recreational activities.

The Toowong area (then known as West Milton), was surveyed and divided into several large estates in 1850. In its early days the Toowong area was an upper-middle class suburb, consisting of detached "villas" on large allotments and made popular by its proximity to the central business district. The opening of the Brisbane to Indooroopilly railway line and Toowong station in 1875 triggered a period of rapid development and a large number of shops and houses were established for the increasing number of residents. In 1880 Toowong's first local authority was elected, the Toowong Divisional Board. However, on 30 May 1880 the area was regrouped and the Shire of Toowong was formed. By the end of the nineteenth century, a large amount of the land surrounding many of the early grand homes had been subdivided into estates. Following sustained growth, on the 19 August 1903, the area was declared the Town of Toowong under the provisions of the Local Authorities Act 1902, and the tram lines were extended to the Toowong Cemetery in the same year. In addition to many other achievements during its time, Toowong Town Council was successful in its focus on securing numerous land allotments for recreational use.

Despite the large number of subdivisions that occurred during the later half of the 19th century, a map from 1895 shows the parcel of land bounded by Sylvan Road, Dixon Street and the railway line to retain large allotments. On the 7 September 1918, Toowong Town Council declared the land a park reserve, to be known as Toowong Park. When Toowong was amalgamated to become part of Greater Brisbane in 1925, management of the park passed to Brisbane City Council.

Australia's involvement in the First World War exacted a heavy toll in death and injury. Of a relatively small population of about five million people, 60,000 service people were killed and 152,000 wounded. The outpouring of grief in Australia that accompanied these deaths, and the fact that the dead were buried overseas, led to a period of memorial building across the nation and residents of Toowong were quick to commemorate their soldiers by rededicating Toowong Park as Toowong Memorial Park and erecting a number of memorial features.

The park's memorial gates were erected to mark both the official opening of the park on 7 September 1918, and to honour people from the local community who enlisted during the First World War. They were originally located closer to the centre of the Sylvan Road perimeter; and were moved to their current location near the southeast corner of the park in 1959. In September 1918, a commemorative avenue of palms was also planted in the park.

In 1919 a competition was held to design a memorial for the park. It was won by a young Scottish draftsman, George Rae, who worked in the Brisbane office of renowned architect Lange Powell. The work on the memorial was carried out by Andrew Lang Petrie Monumental Works, who were the largest monumental masonry firm in Queensland at this time. The firm was also responsible for many other First World War memorials throughout Queensland. The memorial cost £700 and was financed by public fundraising.

The new memorial was known as the Toowong Soldiers' Memorial and was located on a prominent hill within the park. It was unveiled by Queensland Governor Sir Matthew Nathan on 2 July 1922. Following the opening of the memorial, the park became known as Toowong Memorial Park. Recorded on marble tablets affixed to the memorial are the names of 101 residents of the Town of Toowong who enlisted in the First World War. In April 1993, the Toowong sub-branch RSL dedicated another memorial cairn, located just inside the memorial gates in the southeast corner, intended as the new location for Anzac Day ceremonies. In the same year, part of the memorial avenue of palms was relocated to allow completion of a second oval rugby union oval. The palm avenue remains in this alignment, leading toward the RSL memorial from the main entrance of the park. On Anzac Day, processions continue to march along this avenue and gather at the new memorial for the Dawn Service.

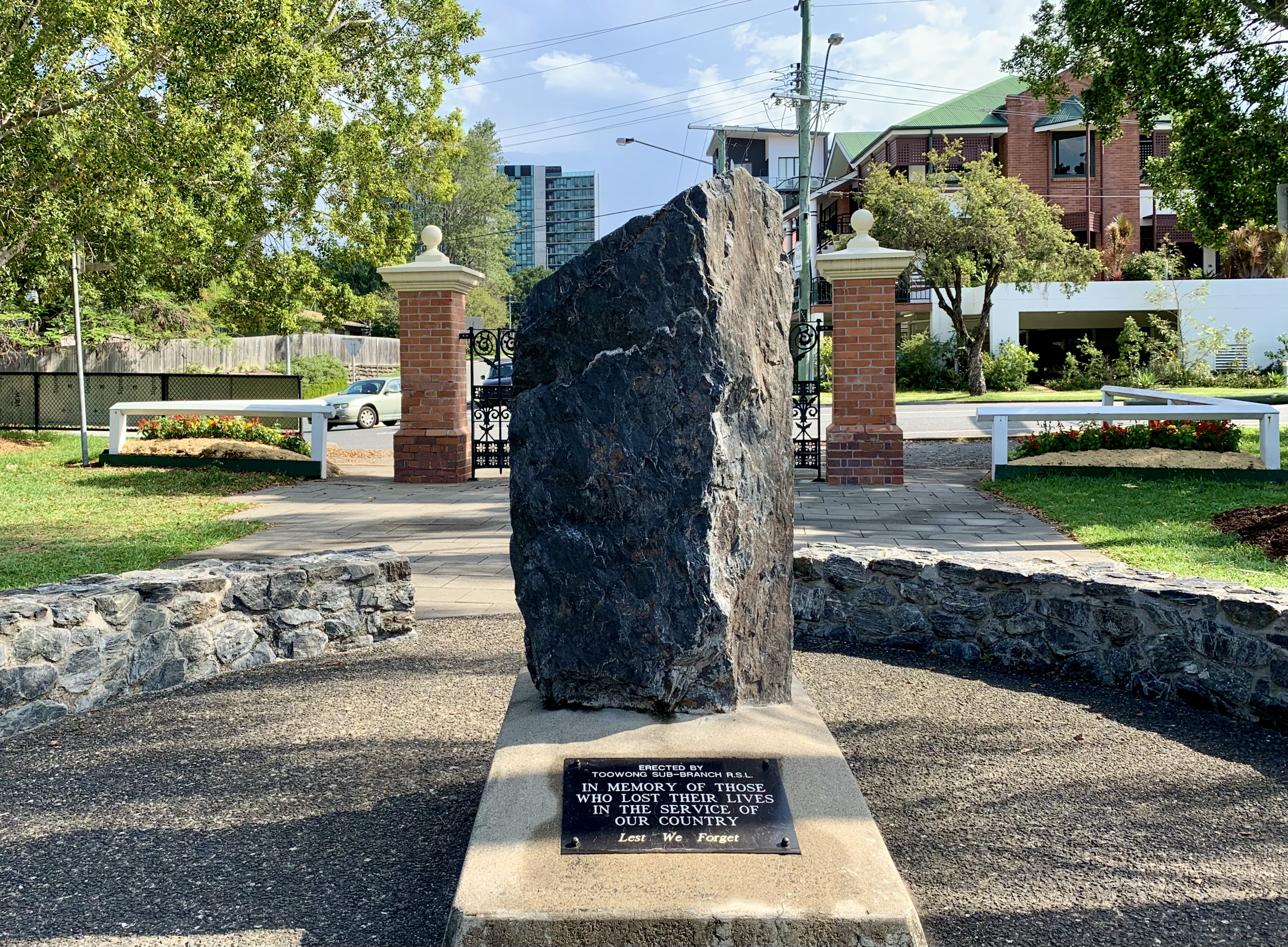
RSL memorial cairn

The park provides an open space for community activities, recreational pastimes and organised sport, a tradition which is continued today. In its early days, the park was the venue for the annual Sunday School picnics, and the Methodist inter-church children's sporting competitions. In 1919, Toowong Council celebrated the signing of the peace treaty at Versailles by throwing a picnic for the local children in the park. More recently, the park has also been home to local Girl Guide and Scout groups, and the former headquarters of both remain in the park.

One of the earliest sporting facilities associated with the park was the Auchenflower Bowls Club, established on Bayliss Street in 1920. The club was sold in 2003 and demolished to make way for townhouses. Part of the land which protruded into the north-west perimeter of the park was resumed by Brisbane City Council. Originally known as the Toowong Rugby Club, the Western Districts Rugby Club (Bulldogs), is the only remaining sporting club to still use the park. Wests Junior Rugby Union Club was formed in 1966 and in 1968 a clubhouse was opened. In 1994 the first Women's team was formed. Sharing the grounds until 1999 was the Toowong Cricket Club, also originally established as a section of the Toowong Amateur Recreation Club in 1948. The Toowong Harriers, one of the oldest athletic clubs in Queensland also used the park during the early 1970s. The park is also home to the Vince Hickey Basketball Stadium and neighbouring public half-court. The stadium was used to host the 1994 World Masters Games, and has also been a venue for the Australian Basketball Championships. It is still currently used for Brisbane Basketball League games.

The Toowong Memorial Park enjoys regular patronage from the Brisbane public for both sporting or recreational purposes and is utilised by the Toowong Returned Services League to conduct remembrance ceremonies throughout the year.

== Description ==
Toowong Memorial Park is bordered by the Main Line railway to the east, Sylvan Road to the south, Dixon Street to the north-east, and Park Lane for a small portion of the north-west perimeter. The remainder of the north-west perimeter is lined by housing predominantly facing Bayliss Street.

The park contains a prominent stony ridge, which runs roughly east to west. In the south and south west, the ridge slopes down towards a large flat area of the ground along Sylvan Road, and in the north, slopes towards Dixon Street. The Dixon Street slope contains the remnants of an avenue of hoop pines.

The former Auchenflower Girl Guide Hut, a timber hall with gabled roof, is located along the north-west boundary, alongside Park Lane. The old Toowong Scout Hall, located in the south-eastern corner of the park, is a rectangular, concrete block building with a hip-roof.

The main oval is located in the south-west corner of the park. Around the northern perimeter of the main oval are numerous buildings and structures of the Western Districts Rugby Football Club. A playground and public toilet facilities are located between the main oval and the far western corner of the park.

A car park is located mid-way along the Sylvan Road boundary and is marked by a row of mature fig trees and smaller trees. Mature figs also encircle the main oval, which is neighboured by another football field to the east. A small stand of palms, from the original location of the avenue, runs alongside the north-eastern side of the main oval. A large section of the original palm avenue, which was relocated in 1993, now runs parallel to Sylvan Road from the car park, and then curves gently towards the memorial gates.

The memorial gates consist of a pair of red brick piers with moulded stone copings painted cream, supporting a set of decorative wrought iron gates. The west pier contains a marble plaque commemorating the enlisted from the town in the First World War and the marble plaque on the east pier lists the aldermen for the Town of Toowong in 1918.

Located in the south-west corner of the park, immediately inside the memorial gates, the RSL memorial cairn. A rough-hewn blue stone boulder monument, standing on a horizontal marble slab, it is encircled by a low blue stone wall which is open to the north and south. A plaque on the cairn records it was erected by the Toowong Sub Branch of the Returned Services League.

The Toowong Soldiers' Memorial is located on the summit of the ridge and is encircled by palm trees. Composed of Helidon freestone, it stands 12 metres (39 ft) high on a 5.75-metre (18.9 ft) square base. It has a fluted Queensland marble drinking fountain, surrounded by carved wreaths and swags. The whole structure is surmounted by a carved cap and ball. Three sides of the monument have marble slabs with the names of the enlisted in lead letters. Twelve stone pillars surround the monument and have metal chains threaded between them. A marble plaque on the eastern pier of the southern opening in this low fence lists those responsible for the erection of the monument.

The Vince Hickey Basketball Stadium, located inside the Dixon Street boundary, is not considered to be significant.

== Heritage listing ==
Toowong Memorial Park was listed on the Queensland Heritage Register on 4 September 2007 having satisfied the following criteria.

The place is important in demonstrating the evolution or pattern of Queensland's history.

War Memorials are important in demonstrating the pattern of Queensland's history as they are representative of a recurrent theme that involved most communities throughout the state. They provide evidence of an era of widespread Australian patriotism and nationalism, particularly during and following the First World War.

The memorial gates, Soldiers' Memorial and avenues of trees, created between 1918 and 1922, are important aspects of the park, demonstrating the theme of remembrance and establishing the layout of the park. They are representative of the process of grieving that was occurring across not only Toowong, but also Queensland and Australia at that time. After the First World War, Toowong Town Council, like most Queensland communities, erected a public memorial to honour local participation in the war.

Toowong Memorial Park is also representative of the importance of sport and recreation in Queensland's history as demonstrated through the sporting ovals and Girl Guide and Scouts Huts.

The place demonstrates rare, uncommon or endangered aspects of Queensland's cultural heritage.

The memorial gates in Toowong Memorial Park are a type of commemorative structure uncommon in Queensland.

The place is important in demonstrating the principal characteristics of a particular class of cultural places.

A public park since 1918 and a memorial park since 1922, Toowong Memorial Park is important as an intact example demonstrating early twentieth century ideals and designs for the layout of such places. Elements within the park include sporting ovals and clubhouses, a Girl Guide hut and Scouts' hut, memorial gates, the Soldiers' Memorial and avenues of palm trees and pines which demonstrate the use of the park for recreational and memorial purposes.

The memorial gates and Soldiers' Memorial are commemorative structures erected as a record of the local impact of a major historical event, and are good examples of their type. Memorial gates are also a less common type of commemorative structure.

The Soldiers' Memorial is also a fine example of the early work of prize winning architect George Rae, who was only 21 years of age at the time, and the craftsmanship of the Brisbane masonry firm, A L Petrie and Son.

The place is important because of its aesthetic significance.

Toowong Memorial Park is important for its aesthetic values as it provides a pleasant vista of open, green space in the otherwise densely populated Toowong landscape. The elements within the park are also important for their aesthetic qualities. The memorial gates provide a dignified entrance and display high quality workmanship and design. The Soldiers' Memorial's elevated position and craftsmanship, make a significant contribution to the park's aesthetic value. The abundance of trees, including mature figs and palms, interspersed with open sporting areas, provide for pleasing vistas within the park.

The place has a strong or special association with a particular community or cultural group for social, cultural or spiritual reasons.

Toowong Memorial Park is important as a community landmark which has been continuously used by the people of Toowong for a variety of social, recreational and memorial functions for almost 90 years. The park, memorial gates and Soldiers' Memorial were commissioned by the Toowong Town Council and are important as a place for remembering the participation and deaths of local Toowong residents in the First World War, and as evidence of the impact of a major historic event. The avenues of palms are also significant for their commemorative function. The park has a long history of use by sporting groups, Girl Guide and Scout groups and strong, ongoing association with the local community, and its aesthetic contribution to the Toowong townscape.
