= Gympie Town Hall =

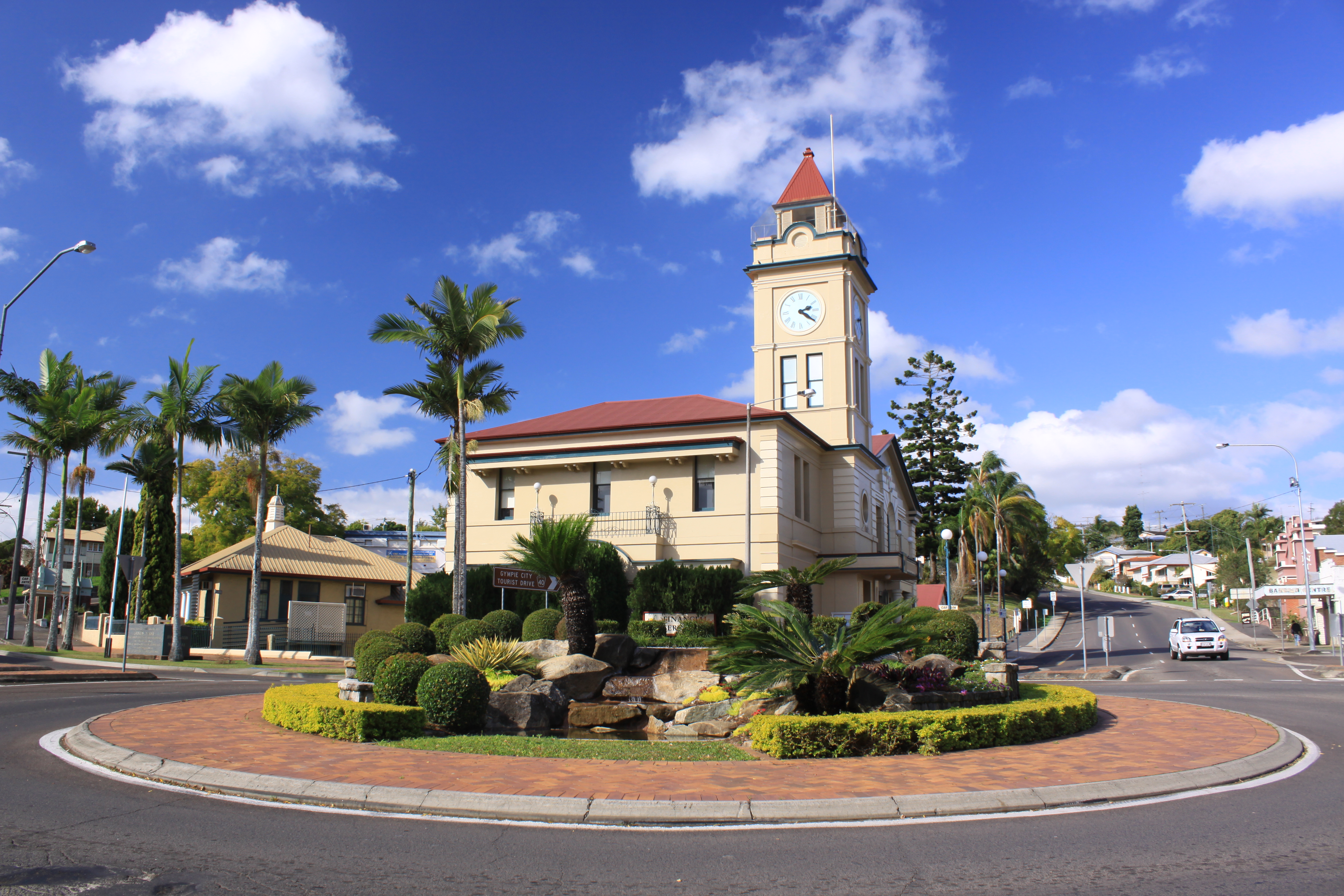
- Gympie Town Hall, 2015

- Location within Queensland Location within Australia
- 26.19°S 152.6659°E
- Location: 2 Caledonian Hill, Gympie, Queensland, Australia

History
- Design period: 1919–1930s (interwar period)
- Built: 1939

Site notes
- Architect(s): Department of Public Works (Queensland), John James Clark
- Architectural styles: Functionalism, Art Deco, Classicism

Queensland Heritage Register
- Official name: Gympie Town Hall Reserve Complex
- Type: state heritage (built)
- Designated: 12 August 2011
- Reference no.: 602789
- Significant period: 1890–
- Significant components: garage, toilet block/earth closet/water closet, other – health/care services: component, hall
- Builders: Marberete Company Pty Ltd, Department of Public Works, Joseph Jew

The Gympie Town Hall is a heritage-listed town hall at 2 Caledonian Hill, Gympie, Queensland, Australia. It was designed by Department of Public Works (Queensland) and John James Clark and built in 1939 by Marberete Company Pty Ltd, Department of Public Works, and Joseph Jew. It was added to the Queensland Heritage Register on 12 August 2011.

== History ==
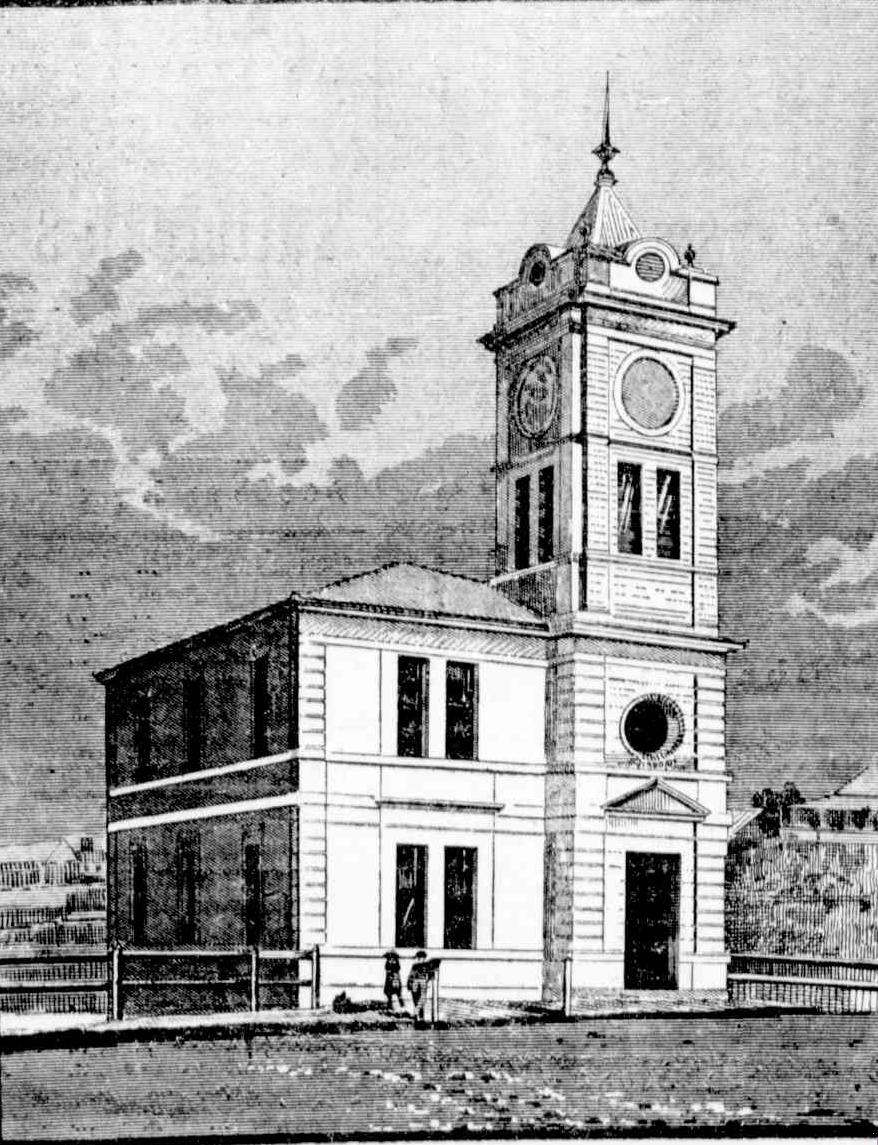
Gympie Town Hall, 1891

The Gympie Town Hall was opened in 1890 on land which had been chosen by the Gympie Town Council in 1883 and was designed by Clark Brothers, who designed several other buildings for the town. It was extended in 1938–1939 by Brisbane architect C H Griffin. The town hall was opened by William Smyth MLA on 4 March 1891 and the first council meeting held in the new chambers took place on the same day.

In 1930, following the 1905 incorporation of Gympie as a city, the new Gympie City Council was considering the construction of a larger town hall to accommodate the growing populations needs. Additions were made to the town hall building in 1938 which included a new post office and reception hall. The Gympie Town Hall's additions were officially opened by the State Treasurer (Mr Frank Cooper) on 21 October 1939.

The completion of the Gympie Town Hall in 1939 was part of a wider pattern of civic building that took place during the second half of the 1930s when numerous town halls were constructed across Australia as an expression of civic pride when the economy was once again on a more secure foundation after the Great Depression.

Between 1977 and 1982 internal alterations to the Gympie Town Hall were undertaken and included architectural work; mechanical and electrical alterations to the auditorium; internal telephone extension relocation and switchboard installation; internal painting of the ground floor; reconstruction of the World War I remembrance alcove; new floor coverings; office equipment; and glass and timber panel partitions.

In 2009 the Gympie Regional Council recommenced meeting in the Gympie Town Hall, after many years of meeting in the former Queensland National Bank building in Channon Street. The remainder of the building continues to be used as office accommodation for council staff.

=== Maternal and Child Welfare Clinic ===
The former Gympie Maternal and Child Welfare Clinic is located in the Town Hall Reserve, facing Mellor Street in central Gympie. It is a concrete rendered building, with an entry portico flanked by four columns, with a rib and pan profile iron roof, including the original fleche. Designed and built by the Department of Public Works, and opened on 24 April 1926, the building is one of ten regional clinics built to a standardised design, of which, only nine remain.

The establishment of baby clinics throughout Queensland following the introduction of the Maternity Act 1922 was part of a national and international movement to improve the health of mothers and babies. The Act also initiated the establishment of a network of free maternity hospitals throughout Queensland, managed under the Motherhood, Child Welfare and Hospital Fund. Financed through the profits of the state run lottery, the Golden Casket, established in 1920, the Act sought to decrease the death rate for mothers and babies; to increase the birth-rate; to expand outback settlement and to train mothers how to care for children and essentially develop a healthy population.

The first baby clinic in Brisbane was established in 1908 and attended by paediatrician Dr Alfred Jefferis Turner, who saw up to 100 babies a week, free of charge. Dr Jefferis Turner was the first resident medical officer of the Brisbane Children's Hospital, appointed in 1889. He made a significant contribution to the development of a diphtheria antitoxin and identified lead in paint as a significant factor in lead poisoning in children. These advances impacted on the reduction of infant mortality rates, but Dr Jefferis Turner was aware that diarrhoeal disease was still a major factor the demise of many babies. There was a higher death rate during the summer months, which could be attributed to poor infant feeding and he embarked on a public health campaign to educate mothers in the hygienic preparation of food, particularly for those infants not breast fed.

Following a conference on child welfare in Sydney in 1916, representatives of women's organisations, benevolent societies and the Creche and Kindergarten Association lobbied the Home Secretary, John Huxham to establish a network of baby clinics in Queensland. In August 1917 he announced that three clinics would be built, which was later expanded to four. At that time the first baby clinic had just been built in Victoria, while New South Wales already had eleven. All were based on the philosophy of New Zealand Doctor, Frederick Truby King, which promoted breast feeding, the training of nurses in maternal and infant welfare and the education of mothers in domestic hygiene.

A national agenda for public health and social reform was implicit in the growth of the town planning movement. The second Australian Town Planning Conference and Exhibition held in Brisbane in mid 1918 included a display illustrating the proper care of babies. The organiser of this conference was Charles Edward Chuter, an officer of the Home Secretary's Department, who was to have a significant impact on local government and on the health system in Queensland. He had managed the finances of the Brisbane General Hospital from 1917, and sought the means to implement the social policies of the recently elected Labour government of T J Ryan. Chuter established the Motherhood, Child Welfare and Hospital Fund, which was financed through the Golden Casket Lottery. He also had significant input into the drafting of the Maternity Act. The decision to operate a regular lottery from 1920, with the profits deposited into the Hospital Trust Account, financed a major building program in maternity hospitals and baby clinics.

The first government baby clinic opened in a rented cottage in Brunswick Street, Fortitude Valley on 8 March 1918, managed by Matron Florence Chatfield of the Diamantina Hospital. Three more clinics opened shortly after at Woolloongabba, Spring Hill and West End. Nurse Chatfield travelled north in October 1920, seeking suitable sites to build clinics in Cairns, Townsville and Rockhampton, preferring a central location, close to the shopping areas and close to public transport. She also sought support from at least one doctor in each town to act as the Honorary Medical Officer, attached to the clinic.

Between October 1923 and November 1924, new baby clinics were erected at Rockhampton, Townsville, Ipswich, Toowoomba, Cairns, Maryborough and Bundaberg. The Fortitude Valley Clinic, which opened in 1924, included a training school for nurses. The training centre staff had been educated in both New Zealand and Sydney and the centre produced eight graduates in 1924 and eleven in 1925. Thirty-five maternity wards were built in hospitals across the state at this time. Between 1926 and 1930 clinics were erected at Gympie, Mackay, Charters Towers and Warwick, with new substantial brick clinics built at Woolloongabba and Herschel Street in the Brisbane central business district. Another large clinic was planned for South Brisbane but was never built.

Ten regional clinics were based on a standard plan produced by the Department of Public Works. These included: Rockhampton, Townsville, Ipswich, Toowoomba, Maryborough, Bundaberg, Gympie, Mackay, Charters Towers and Warwick. The Rockhampton clinic was the first to be opened on Saturday 27 October 1923. It was described in the 1924 Queensland Parliamentary Papers Report of the Department of Public Works as:

A compact tile-roofed one-storey reinforced cement plaster building of attractive design, containing waiting hall 16 ft by 16 ft; a doctor's room 12 ft by 11 ft; treatment room 13 ft by 11 ft; retiring and nurses rooms 11ft by 10 ft with water closet, lavatories, store, press etc. Modern fittings and furnishings have been installed throughout and a septic system provided for conveniences.

The Cairns clinic which opened in January 1924 was not of the standard design, being a larger high set timber structure, built on part of a railway reserve fronting Martyn Street.

The selection of a site for a baby clinic for Gympie occurred during the early part of 1925 with regular correspondence between the local Member of the Queensland Legislative Assembly for Gympie, Thomas Dunstan, the Assistant Minister for Works and the Home Secretary James Stopford. The Under Secretary George Chuter and the Mayor Alderman George Thomas undertook a site inspection on 7 March and agreed that part of the Town Hall Reserve facing Mellor Street was the best location. The council agreed to allocate a site within the Town Hall reserve, because the clinic would be of benefit to the district. It passed the resolution on 19 March 1925, and verbal agreement was made by the council that it would provide fill for the site. The architect Willian Ewart visited in April and assured the Town Clerk that the plans and specifications were in hand and the building would be completed as soon as possible. The proposed building was specified as a concrete one storey structure with a Marseilles tiled roof and Doric pillared entrance, including a waiting room for mothers, infant's treatment room, kitchen, bathroom, ladies' retiring room and day room for the nurses. The standard design baby clinics were all founded on the same plan drawn up in January 1923, with some amendments to suit each individual site. The Gympie Clinic was built with two toilets; one accessible from within the clinic, and one with an external door, adjacent to the Town Hall, accessible to the public. (A separate men's toilet was located nearby.) Two nurses were appointed to the clinic, with one stationed at the clinic and the other largely devoted to visiting mothers in their own homes within the district.

The building, which cost £2,355, was opened on Saturday 24 April 1926 by the Minister for Works, James Kirwan. He referred to the clinic as the "Temple of the Babe", an analogy first used by the Assistant Home Secretary Mr Frank Brennan at the opening of the Toowoomba Baby Clinic in December 1923. Kirwan reiterated the government policy promoting motherhood and child welfare, indicating that the clinic had already begun operation prior to the official opening. Nurse McGrath had already begun her rounds of the district, visiting 83 babies, and 25 mothers had consulted the clinic. He said the building, was a beautiful structure which was an architectural adornment to the city of Gympie. When the Director of Infant Welfare, Dr Jefferis Turner wrote his first annual report in June 1927, he indicated that the Gympie Clinic had a good relationship with the local maternity nurses, and it had outperformed some older ones in the state, in terms of the numbers of new born babies visited by the clinic sisters.

In 1933, the Gympie Town Clerk advised the Department of Works that a large amount of spoil had been generated in the process of excavating for a new sewer. This had been used to fill the Town Hall Reserve, but had in fact filled part of the lower flight of steps at the rear of the baby clinic. It advised that the landing would be extended to provide easier access to the clinic and the remainder of the lower steps would lead to the yard. During the early 1930s the clinic sister experienced difficulties sleeping because of the constant noise from the public toilet in the clinic building adjacent to her bedroom. At that time it was agreed to lock the female toilet at 11.00pm.

The back landing was enclosed with lattice in 1936. By 1941, heavy rain had caused subsidence of this and earlier fill, causing damage to the back steps and requiring the installation of a 6-foot-square (1.8 m) concrete slab at the foot of the stairs.

The Gympie Town Council wrote to the Department of Public Works in June 1950, indicating that the town hall was being repainted and suggested that the baby clinic be painted at the same time. Tenders were called in September and the exterior painting proceeded. Some interior painting was also carried out at this time with repairs to the front stairs and front gate, and painting of exterior Venetian blinds. In 1956 the interior walls and furniture was painted. The connection of sewerage in May 1964 led to further alterations and additions to the interior including a complete internal and external repaint, in pastel shades. The bathroom was upgraded with a new bath and hand basins. New cupboards were built in the kitchen and new linoleum was laid throughout. The furniture was also repainted.

Plans for further additions to provide living accommodation were drawn up in April 1964. The proposed 22-by-21-foot (6.7 by 6.4 m) extension was to comprise two bedrooms, a bathroom, laundry, WC, dining room and new street access. However the Gympie City Council was in opposition to any extensions to the clinic because it would partly encroach on recent improvements to the car park, and new access roadways within Town Hall Reserve. The council wrote to the Secretary of Lands Administration enquiring as to the original agreement reached in relation to land allocated prior to the construction of the baby clinic. The Land Administration was unable to present any formal documentation of the initial allocation of the site, as it had been the product of a verbal agreement between the MLA at the time, the Hon T Dunstan, the Mayor, Aldermen and Town Clerk of Gympie. While the council passed a motion approving the erection of the baby clinic on the Town Hall Reserve, it appears that no formal agreement was made on land allocation for the clinic. The planned extensions did not proceed.

It is unclear when the tile roof was replaced with iron, but a number of clinics had experienced problems with the tiled roof, with the Townsville clinic's replaced by 1927.

The Maternal and Child Health Clinic services were transferred to the Gympie Hospital in 1992. The former baby clinic building was then occupied by the State Emergency Service (later the Gympie Regional Emergency Management Team) for fifteen years. This team was transferred to Caloundra in 2007. The Cooloola Family and Community Development Workers then mounted a petition to request a lease of the building to re-establish a clinic providing maternal and child health services, collaboratively run by the Cooloola Community Hub staff and the Gympie Child Health Services. It appears that no action was taken on this proposal. The Gympie Regional Council's Youth Development Unit now occupies the building.

=== Art Deco Men's Toilet Block ===
The Art Deco Men's Toilet Block in Mellor Street and sited on Gympie's Town Hall Reserve was erected c. 1920s. It is one of only two known toilet blocks in this architectural style in Queensland, the other reported to be at Mareeba.

Public toilets in Mellor Street were in existence in 1925 as Council minutes reveal that the Chamber of Commerce requested the provision of a light at the public lavatory in Mellor Street. However, the toilet block does not appear on a partial site plan for the reserve drawn in 1925 when the Gympie Maternal and Child Welfare Clinic was being planned for the site. The Art Deco toilet block does not reflect the architectural style of the nearby Gympie Town Hall (designed 1938), which leads to the conclusion that the toilet block was constructed before 1938.

== Description ==
The Gympie Town Hall precinct comprising Town Hall, Garage, former Maternal and Child Welfare Clinic and Men's Toilet Block is located at the top end of Nash's Gully on a large wedge-shaped site at the fiveways intersection of Caledonian Hill, Calton Hill, and Mary, Lawrence and Mellor Streets, and is bound to the north by Alma Street in Gympie's central business area.

The Gympie Town Hall is a stately two storey masonry building with part basement and a grand bell tower. The building is prominently located on a busy intersection and has a two street frontage to Caledonian Hill and Mellor Street. Its elevated bell tower together with its high quality of design gives it considerable aesthetic appeal.

The Town Hall, constructed in two stages, has an asymmetrically composed exterior form with Neo-classical characteristics which include the use of columns, a dominant pediment and decorative cornicing and quoins at the buildings corners to give the building a sense of solidity and robustness. Its exterior is carefully detailed and finished with smooth cement-render ruled to imitate ashlar. The bell tower is positioned over the main public entrance into the building and the surrounding roof, clad in corrugated metal sheeting is hipped over the c. 1890 portion and gabled over the c. 1938 portion.

The building's south-facing Caledonian Hill facade has two major components reflecting its staged construction.

The c. 1890 western end features a cantilevered street awning over the western entrance detailed with decorative cornicing and circular motifs. Horizontal banding visually distinguishes the building's two floor levels. Tall, rectangular windows puncture the western end of the elevation while a circular porthole style window is centrally located above the western entrance. From here the bell tower rises and features tall, rectangular windows and clock faces to all four sides. It is capped with a pyramidal roof and a scalloped parapet wall forms a solid balustrade allowing access to the bell chamber. Access into the c. 1890 end of the elevation is via timber paneled doors which open onto an octagonal-shaped and timber-lined entrance vestibule. A decorative leadlight fanlight is located above the entrance. Another pair of glazed and paneled swing doors on pivoting hinges provides access into the lower vestibule. Floors in the entrance vestibule are terrazzo with a central motif pattern.

The c. 1939 eastern end is a symmetrical composition with large stucco quoins and capitals visually supporting the raked moulded cornice to the gable. The centrally placed entrance is framed by a projecting balcony with a wrought iron balustrade supported on Doric- style columns. A tall, arched doorway with ruled stucco keystone and reveals opens onto the balcony and is framed by tall rectangular windows with timber framed casements. Windows on the lower level are timber framed and recessed into the masonry facade and ornate wrought iron bars secure the openings. The entrance door has been replaced with an aluminum hinged door.

The elevation facing west to Mellor Street has similar detailing to the main elevation. It is symmetrical in layout with stucco quoins emphasizing the corners while horizontal banding visually distinguishes the building's two floor levels. A false balcony runs along the upper floor level with decorative wrought iron balustrading and art nouveau style lights at each end. A large arched window framed with ruled stucco reveals, lintel and keystone rises from the lower level and is finished with a shallow awning formed from masonry supported on oversized decorative brackets. On the upper floor three tall rectangular windows with timber-framed double-hung sashes are sheltered by a timber framed window awning supported on pairs of carved timber brackets. Eaves gutters to the main roof and the upper window awning are formed from metal and are quad-profiled.

The northern elevation where tall rectangular windows and a large arched leadlight window are located is simpler in detail. A lean-to roofed structure containing amenities is located on the lower level while a more substantial c. 1939 timber-framed verandah is located on the upper level accessed by timber-framed service stairs. The land is retained at the building line to allow access and light into a basement level and service yard. A lean-to structure has been recently constructed to the eastern end of the elevation.

The symmetrical eastern elevation comprises stucco quoins at each corner. Large arched windows are located on the upper floor. A gable roofed side porch projects towards a service area on the lower floor and features a large arched window flanked by smaller timber-framed casement windows. Decorative square pilasters are located at the corners.

Rectangular in plan with projecting wings to the east and northeast corner, the building is organised over two levels. The ground floor houses a foyer space, a former public office and clerk's office, a former post-office space, a former post-masters office together with several other offices to the north. Located on the first floor are the council chamber and vestibule, a former mayor's reception room and office, a kitchen and enclosed verandah.

The ground floor foyer space has generous internal openings consisting of pairs of timber-paneled doors with lead-light glazed pivoting fanlights above. Walls and ceilings are plaster with decorative paneling formed by plaster cornicing with some areas lined with timber paneling. Timber joinery is intact throughout with varnished finish. At the base of the public staircase is a memorial board enclosure with decorative timber screens. Floors are lined with terrazzo. A single pendant light hangs centrally from the ceiling.

Other rooms on this level have similar though simpler detailing. In the former public office to the west, walls are hard plaster with elaborately moulded cornices. Timber joinery including architraves, window sashes and skirtings are painted though some timber joinery in the former public office has a varnished finish. Full-height partition walls have been erected in the former post office public space. Floors are lined with recent carpet. Door furniture has generally been replaced though some china and brass door handles remain.

Access to the first floor is via an elegant timber staircase with walls and balustrades of paneled timber. A round handrail is fixed with brackets to the balustrade and follows the curve of the staircase. Treads and risers are lined with carpet. Natural light enters the stairwell through the large arched leadlight window which is framed by wall mounted Art Deco light fittings. The vaulted ceiling over the stair is simply detailed and forms an archway to the upper vestibule. The upper level vestibule has walls lined with hard plaster and timber-paneling. Plaster ceilings have moulded plaster cornices. Timber skirting boards, architraves architrave blocks are intact throughout the room and all interior timber work and joinery has a varnished finish. Internal openings are generous in height and doors feature tall glazed pivoting fanlights. The first floor offices have varnished joinery including doors, architraves and picture rails and unusual decorative pelmets. Skirtings in these rooms have been painted.

The council chamber is a finely detailed room with timber-paneling to the perimeter of the room including columns. Early glass, wall-hung pendant lights remain. Floors are carpeted.

The tower is accessed from the first floor via a narrow timber staircase and by timber ladders within the tower itself to the clock and bell chamber. The clock is in working order with faces, featuring Roman numerals, housed in each elevation. Above the clock, a bell chamber contains a bell and hammer. The bell is formed from cast metal and both the bell and the hammer are painted – the crown and yoke are hidden behind a fibrous cement soffit. The bell chamber is screened in each corner by louvred timber panels.

Few early furnishings remain in the building apart from honour boards, framed portraits and timber seating in the upper vestibule.

Early brick foundations are visible in the basement along with the timber floor boards, joists, posts and beams. Rock formed retaining walls also remain. Walls to the eastern end of the basement are rendered and have concrete slab floor. To the east of the Town Hall is an asphalt carpark where a 1938–1939 garage is located. The double garage with gabled roof clad in pre- painted corrugated metal sheeting is contemporary and sympathetic to the Town Hall addition. It has a masonry facade to Caledonian Hill with other walls timber framed and clad in fibrous cement sheet, all with a painted finish. Mown lawns and trimmed hedges address the fiveways intersection which is separated from the building by wrought iron picket fencing and a stand of palm trees. The setting to Caledonian Hill is more utilitarian with a wide paved footpath abutting the building at the boundary line.

The building's bell tower can be seen from various hillside locations within the town and as such symbolises and reinforces the importance of civic leadership and is a significant landmark in Gympie. The building dominates its site and together with its tall bell tower has a powerful presence in the streetscape. It is a landmark within Gympie and forms part of a majestic group of late 19th-century buildings in the town.

=== Maternal and Child Welfare Clinic ===
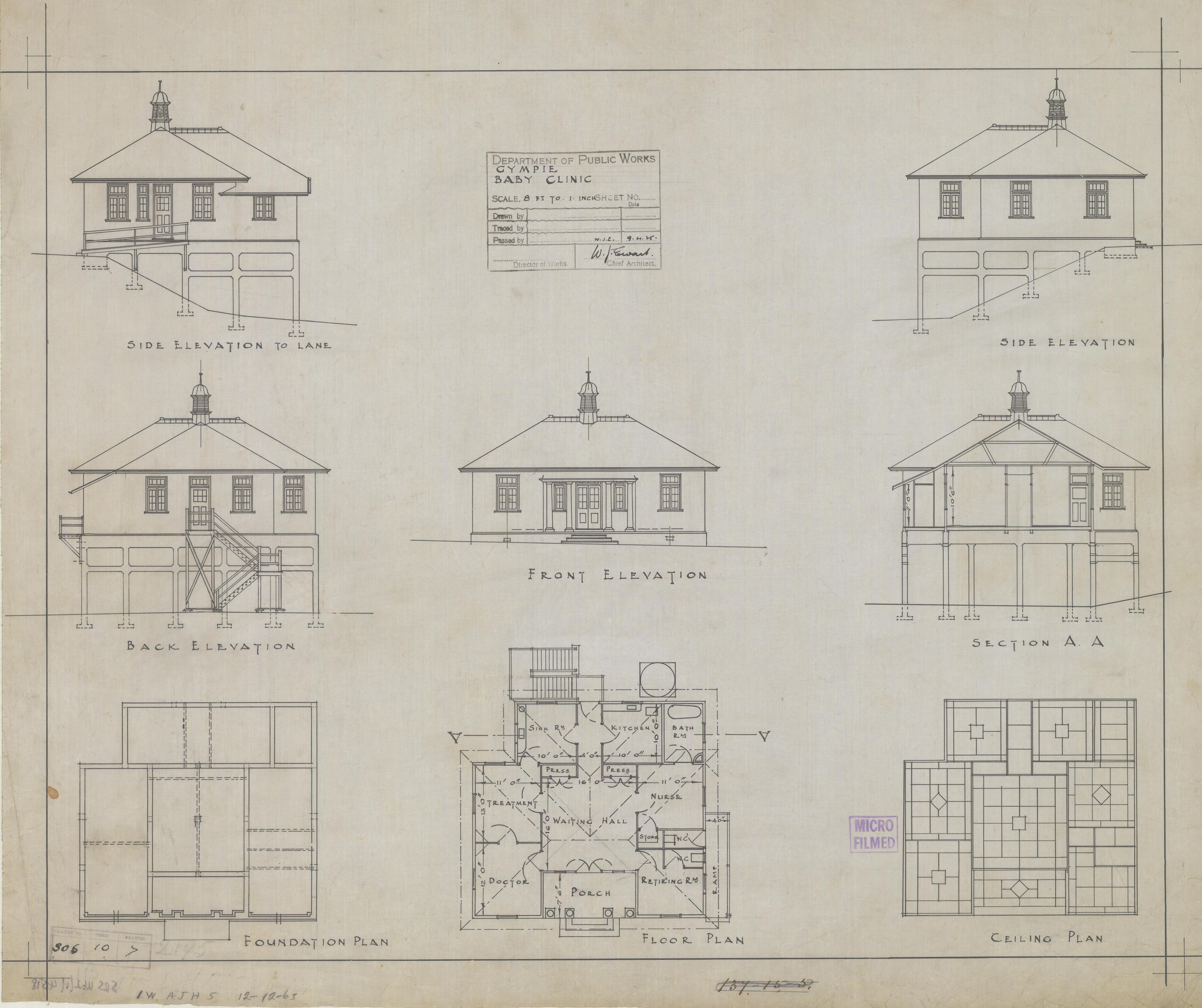
Architectural plans, Gympie Baby Clinic, 1925

The former Gympie Maternal and Child Welfare Clinic faces north-west onto Mellor Street and is flanked by the entry to the council car park on the northern side and the Town Hall on the southern side. With its symmetrical form and portico derived from a classical temple it displays elements of an Interwar Classical style. It is a single storey reinforced concrete structure with a painted roughcast finish, a multi-hipped roof clad in pre-painted square-fluted sheeting with battened eaves and an original fleche centred along its main ridge.

Two concrete steps and a recessed concrete paved portico flanked by four Tuscan columns form the entrance to the building from Mellor Street. Original exterior joinery generally survives to all elevations with original obscure glazing to all fanlights and doors. Windows generally comprise single or paired six-light timber casements with two or four-light fanlights above respectively and timber sills. The bathroom in the south-east corner has a smaller pair of four-light casements. Original doors comprise a six-light French entrance door, a six-light high waist rear door and a four-light high waist female public toilet door, all with four-light fanlights above. Some fanlights have been removed to accommodate air conditioning units with fixed aluminium louvred awnings over and the single casement toilet window on the north-east elevation has been infilled.

The building, which in 2011 is the office for Gympie Regional Council's Youth and Community Development, is generally square in plan and symmetrical in layout retaining its original partition walls with rooms opening off each side of the former waiting room and rear corridor. To the left, from front to back, are the former doctor's room and treatment rooms; and to the right are the former mother's retiring room, external female public toilet, nurse's bedroom/bathroom and kitchen. The former retiring room has been adapted as a store and the toilet remodelled. The nurse's bedroom incorporates a large storage cupboard. The kitchen retains its 1960s fitout and the former nurse's bathroom with raked ceiling is now used for storage. Most internal doors have been replaced with sliding doors but borrowed lights with obscure glazing remain. Ceiling are lined with fibrous cement sheeting.

The ceilings are lined with fibrous cement sheeting and cover strips, decoratively placed. All ceilings retain lattice ventilation panels with some partially concealed by later fluorescent light fittings. Interior walls are a combination of rendered concrete and fibrous cement sheeting with cover battens. Ceilings are fibro with decorative placement of the cover strips, as defined by the original architect's plans.

The former clinic is flanked at the front by a rendered concrete fence with metal balustrade and metal gate on Mellor Street. Entry to the female public toilet is via a timber ramp and landing, accessible through a timber gate from Mellor Street. This ramp is supported by timber posts. A privacy screen of lattice has been erected around the landing. An original enamelled cast iron sink is situated on the landing for hand washing. Under the landing there is access to a storage space under the building. The landing outside the back door also has a lattice screen. Four timber steps descend to a concrete slab. The building retains a cylindrical galvanised iron water tank on a concrete stumped tank stand, located external to the bathroom and kitchen area.

=== Art Deco Toilet Block ===
The Art Deco Men's Toilet Block is located in the northern corner of the reserve and fronts Mellor Street amid an elevated garden bed of native shrubs to the rear and sides at the corner of Alma Street. To the rear of the building is the Town Hall public carpark, the entrance of which is west of the toilet block.

The Art Deco Men's Toilet Block is a small masonry T-shaped building with a stepped parapet concealing gabled roofs clad in corrugated pre- painted metal sheeting. It is constructed of mid-brown face brick on a concrete base and with painted cement rendered banding at shoulder height extending across the parapet at the front and continuous around the building to the fascia board.

The Mellor Street elevation comprises two simple entrances at each end beneath a continuous rendered masonry hood. Above the hood, three centrally located vertical fins extend to the top of the parapet between a simple string course above which a short stretcher course of brick is featured in the parapet on either side of the fins. A fluorescent light is located centrally on the horizontal hood below the decorative fins.

Openings in the side elevations are limited to two high-level terracotta vents and the rear elevation has a projecting gable with a central vertically aligned window. Each side of the projecting gable is a window of the same dimensions but with a concrete block and breeze block infill. The gable to the main roof has flat sheet cladding with three vertical, decorative timber cover strips.

The toilet block comprises two rooms, with both entrances opening into the larger which houses a stainless steel urinal fixed along the front wall of the building. On the opposite wall, to the left of stainless steel hand basin, is the entrance to a single lavatory stall. The lavatory window opening is fitted with a small profile steel window grille providing light and ventilation together with a ventilation screen located above the door head along the length of the stall wall. A box fluorescent light is sited above the hand basin. The interior has painted brickwork walls, a battened fibrous cement sheeted ceiling and a tiled floor. The interior fittings are not regarded as significant.

== Heritage listing ==
Gympie Town Hall Reserve Complex was listed on the Queensland Heritage Register on 12 August 2011.
