= George Rae (physician) =

George Rae is a British doctor and one of the presenters of the television programme Street Doctor, a prime time medical reality TV series on BBC One. The programme began its second series in 2008.

He practises in Whitley Bay in the north-east of England.

He is a member of the BMA Council.
