= 1909–10 Hibernian F.C. season =

Hibernian
1909–10 season
- Manager: Dan McMichael
- Scottish First Division: 8th
- Scottish Cup: Semi-Final
- Average home league attendance: 13,721 (down 618)

During the 1909–10 season Hibernian, a football club based in Edinburgh, finished eighth out of 18 clubs in the Scottish First Division.

== Scottish First Division ==
Match Day	Date	Opponent	H/A	Score	Hibernian Scorer(s)	Attendance
1	21 August	Third Lanark	A	1–0		6,000
2	28 August	Celtic	H	1–0		18,000
3	4 September	Port Glasgow Athletic	A	2–0		3,000
4	18 September	Kilmarnock	H	2–1		4,000
5	20 September	Rangers	H	1–0		12,000
6	25 September	Aberdeen	A	0–1		10,500
7	2 October	Motherwell	A	1–3		6,000
8	9 October	Third Lanark	H	0–0		4,000
9	16 October	Queen's Park	A	2–1		10,000
10	23 October	Heart of Midlothian	H	1–4		14,000
11	30 October	Clyde	A	1–2		6,000
12	6 November	Dundee	H	0–0		8,000
13	13 November	St Mirren	H	0–0		4,000
14	20 November	Kilmarnock	A	0–4		5,000
15	27 November	Falkirk	A	0–2		5,000
16	4 December	Airdrieonians	H	3–0		4,000
17	11 December	Hamilton Academical	A	1–1		2,000
18	18 December	Port Glasgow Athletic	H	2–1		3,000
19	25 December	Partick Thistle	A	1–3		4,500
20	1 January	Heart of Midlothian	A	0–1		14,000
21	3 January	Morton	H	2–1		4,000
22	8 January	Queen's Park	H	1–0		3,000
23	15 January	Morton	A	0–2		4,000
24	12 February	Clyde	H	0–1		3,000
25	5 March	Falkirk	H	1–1		3,000
26	26 March	Rangers	A	0–1		12,000
27	2 April	St Mirren	A	0–3		4,000
28	9 April	Partick Thistle	H	3–1		3,500
29	13 April	Dundee	A	2–4		4,000
30	18 April	Aberdeen	H	1–2		1,500
31	23 April	Motherwell	H	1–0		1,000
32	25 April	Celtic	A	0–0		4,000
33	27 April	Airdrieonians	A	2–0		2,000
34	30 April	Hamilton Academical	H	1–0		1,000

=== Final League table ===
P	Team	Pld	W	D	L	GF	GA	GD	Pts
7	Third Lanark	34	13	8	13	62	44	18	34
8	Hibernian	34	14	6	14	33	40	–7	34
9	Airdrieonians	34	12	9	13	46	57	–11	33

=== Scottish Cup ===
Round	Date	Opponent	H/A	Score	Hibernian Scorer(s)	Attendance
R1	22 January	Hamilton Academical	A	0–0		10,000
R1 R	29 January	Hamilton Academical	H	2–0		10,000
R2	5 February	Ayr	A	1–0		3,000
R3	25 February	Heart of Midlothian	A	1–0		25,000
SF	12 March	Dundee	H	0–0		17,000
SF R	19 March	Dundee	A	0–0		23,000
SF 2R	12 March	Dundee	N	0–1		20,000

== See also ==
- List of Hibernian F.C. seasons
