= George Rae (architect) =

Australian architect

George Rae (born 1901) was an Australian architect. He designed some of Brisbane's best interwar apartment buildings. A number of his works are listed on the Queensland Heritage Register.

== Early life ==
George Rae was born on 8 March 1901 in at 20 Avon Street, Glasgow, Scotland, son of Alexander Don Renwick Rae and his wife Agnes McLean McPherson.

== Career ==
From 1927 to 1931, George Rae worked for Atkinson, Powell and Conrad. From 1931 to 1933, he was in partnership with Lange Leopold Powell.

In his early thirties and one of Brisbane's most successful young architects, Rae had established his own architectural practice in Brisbane in 1933. Rae designed a variety of buildings, including new forms of architectural construction to Brisbane such as picture theatres and residential flats. His more substantial purpose-designed flat buildings are amongst the most important of their type and their period in Brisbane.

== Works ==
His works include:

- Gympie and Widgee War Memorial Gates erected in 1920
- Toowong Soldiers' Memorial erected c. 1922
- Carrington (corner of Warry Street and Gregory Terrace, Spring Hill) erected in 1933
- Highview (on Dornoch Terrace, Highgate Hill) designed in 1933–34
- Casa del Mar (44 Moray Street, New Farm) erected in 1934
- Greystaines (240 Kingsford Smith Drive, Hamilton) constructed in 1934
- Green Gables (one of the Julius Street Flats) (corner of Julius and Moray streets, New Farm) erected in 1935.
- Cinema Taj, Abadan, Iran opened in 1944.
- Cinema Regent, Murwillumbah, New South Wales, Australia opened in 1947.
- Oceanic motel, Kirra Beach, Queensland opened in 1959
