= List of public art in the London Borough of Barnet =

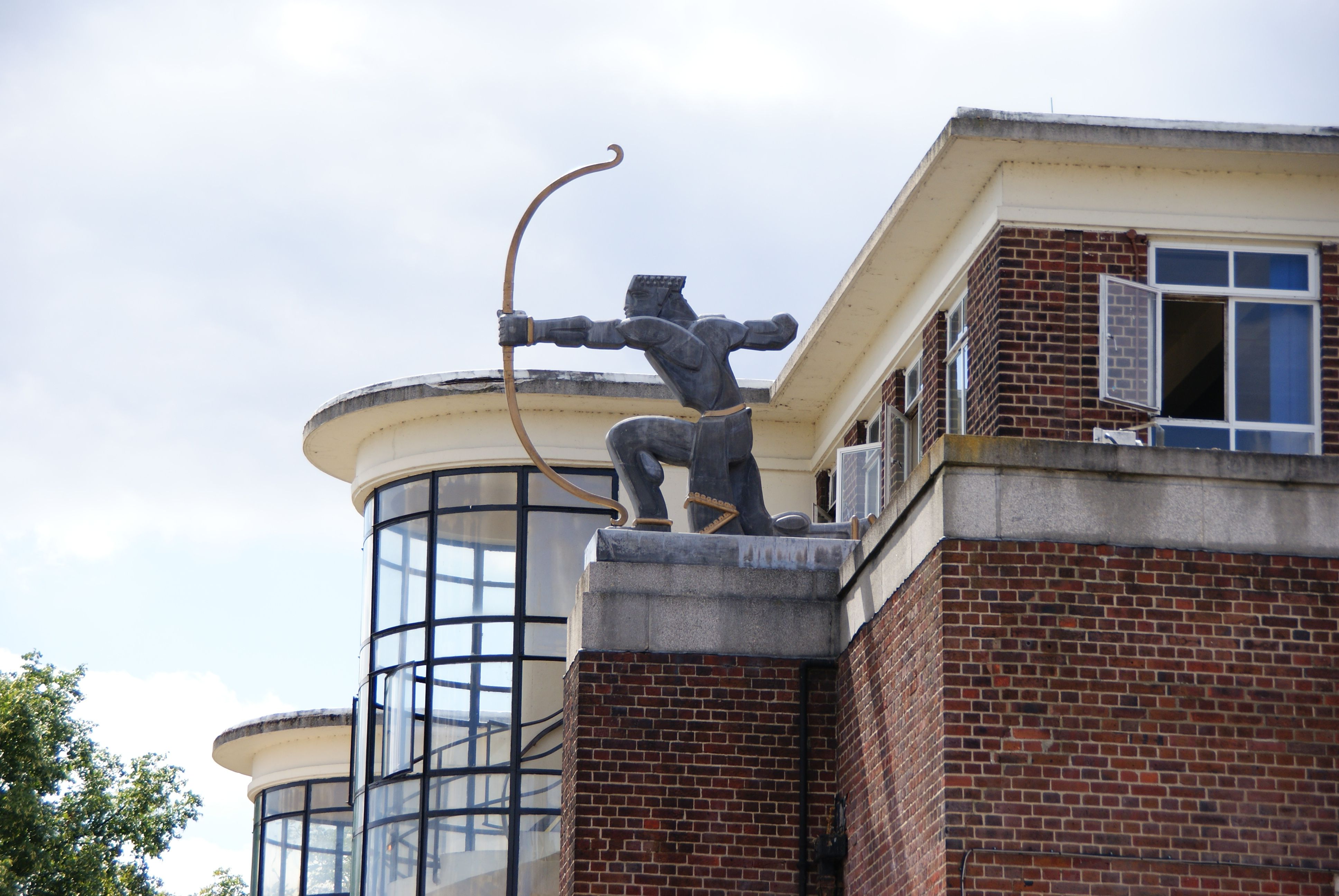
The Archer by Eric Aumonier at East Finchley tube station

This is a list of public art in the London Borough of Barnet.

== Arkley ==
Image	Title / subject	Location and coordinates	Date	Artist / designer	Architect / other	Type	Designation	Notes
More images	Arkley War Memorial	Junction of Barnet Road and Rowley Green Road 51.6477°N 0.2319°W	1920	?	—N/a	Celtic cross	Grade II	

== Barnet Vale ==
Image	Title / subject	Location and coordinates	Date	Artist / designer	Architect / other	Type	Designation	Notes
	Saint Mark, Christ as the Good Shepherd and Saint Alban	St Mark's Church 51.6528°N 0.1850°W	1909, 1917 and 1926	Nathaniel Hitch	John Loughborough Pearson	Statues in niches	Grade II	
	Figure with bowl	Hadley Heights, 134 Hadley Road 51.6578°N 0.1828°W	2001	"A.H."	—N/a	Sculpture	—N/a	

== Brent Cross ==
Image	Title / subject	Location and coordinates	Date	Artist / designer	Architect / other	Type	Designation	Notes
	Here we come, here we rise	Staples Corner 51.5715°N 0.2297°W	2023	Lakwena	IF_DO	Façade	—N/a	Constructed around an electrical substation
	Time passes & still I think of you	Brent Cross West railway station 51.5687°N 0.2269°W	2023	Giles Round	—N/a	Frieze	—N/a	

== Chipping Barnet ==
Image	Title / subject	Location and coordinates	Date	Artist / designer	Architect / other	Type	Designation	Notes
More images	Barnet Boys School Boer War Memorial	Opposite Christ Church, St Albans Road 51.6585°N 0.2045°W	1903	?	—N/a	Obelisk	Grade II	Unveiled in July 1903 by Field Marshal Lord Grenfell.
More images	Chipping Barnet War Memorial	Outside St John the Baptist's Church, Wood Street 51.6532°N 0.2015°W	1921	?	—N/a	Celtic cross	Grade II	Unveiled 5 April 1921 by General the Lord Byng of Vimy.

== Colindale ==
Image	Title / subject	Location and coordinates	Date	Artist / designer	Architect / other	Type	Designation	Notes
	Field	Alderney Close 51.5928°N 0.2399°W	2018	Jo Chapman	—N/a	Sculpture	—N/a	

== East Barnet ==
Image	Title / subject	Location and coordinates	Date	Artist / designer	Architect / other	Type	Designation	Notes
More images	East Barnet War Memorial	Junction of Church Hill Road and East Barnet Road 51.6426°N 0.1629°W	1920	?	A. E. Prentice (builder)	Celtic cross	Grade II	Unveiled 27 June 1920.

== Finchley ==
Image	Title / subject	Location and coordinates	Date	Artist / designer	Architect / other	Type	Designation	Notes
More images	La Délivrance	Henly's Corner 51.5909°N 0.2000°W	1914–1918	Émile Oscar Guillaume	—N/a	Statue	Grade II*	Unveiled 20 October 1927 by David Lloyd George.
More images	Finchley Garden Village War Memorial	Village Road 51.5987°N 0.2080°W	1924	?	—N/a	Pedestal lamp	Grade II	Unveiled 6 December 1924.
More images	Finchley War Memorial	Ballards Lane, North Finchley, outside United Services Club 51.6123°N 0.1778°W	By 1925	?	?	War memorial with relief	—N/a	
	Saint Philip the Apostle	St Philip's Church 51.5975°N 0.1978°W	1933	?	T. H. B. Scott	Mosaic	—N/a	
More images	The Archer	East Finchley tube station 51.58716°N 0.16442°W	1939–1940	Eric Aumonier	Charles Holden and L. H. Bucknell	Architectural sculpture; statue	Grade II	
	Carving of Dick Turpin on tree	Great North Road 51.6024°N 0.1724°W	c. 1998	Students of Barnet College	—N/a	Relief	—N/a	
More images	A Conversation with Spike Spike Milligan	Grounds of Stephens House, 17 East End Road 51.5967°N 0.1942°W	2014	John Somerville	—N/a	Statue on bench	—N/a	
	Susanna Wesley	East Finchley Methodist Church, High Road, East Finchley	2022	Simon O'Rouke	—N/a	Wooden statue	—N/a	Unveiled 2022, the first public sculpture of Wesley.

== Friern Barnet ==
Image	Title / subject	Location and coordinates	Date	Artist / designer	Architect / other	Type	Designation	Notes
More images	Statue of Queen Victoria with the attributes of Peace	Friary Park 51.61842°N 0.16079°W	1862	Joseph Durham	—N/a	Statue	Grade II	Unveiled 4 February 1911. Originally conceived by Prince Albert as the crowning feature of the Memorial to the Great Exhibition in South Kensington, the statue was substituted for one of the Prince himself after his death. Exhibited at the 1862 International Exhibition, it was afterwards installed in the nearby gardens of the Royal Horticultural Society. It was donated to Friary Park shortly before the park's opening by the businessman Sydney Simmons. The figure was re-dedicated as a memorial to Edward VII, who had recently died and who was sometimes called "the Peacemaker".
More images	Friern Barnet Parishioners War Memorial	Churchyard of St James the Great 51.6212°N 0.1638°W	1921	?	—N/a	Memorial cross	—N/a	Unveiled in July 1921.

== Golders Green ==
Image	Title / subject	Location and coordinates	Date	Artist / designer	Architect / other	Type	Designation	Notes
	Calvary	St Edward the Confessor's Church, Finchley Road 51.5764°N 0.1967°W	1915	Attributed to Joseph Armitage	Arthur Young	Architectural sculpture	Grade II	
More images	Golders Green War Memorial	Golders Green town centre 51.5716°N 0.1955°W	1923	—N/a	Possibly Frank T. Dear	Clock tower	Grade II	Unveiled 21 April 1923.

=== Golders Hill Park ===
Image	Title / subject	Location and coordinates	Date	Artist / designer	Architect / other	Type	Designation	Notes
	Water Baby	Golders Hill Park 51.56827°N 0.18700°W	1950	Edward Bainbridge Copnall	—N/a	Sculptural fountain	—N/a	
	Gazebo	Golders Hill Park 51.56744°N 0.18844°W	1983	Wendy Taylor	—N/a	Sculpture	—N/a	
	Golders Hill Girl	Golders Hill Park 51.56801°N 0.18634°W	1991	Patricia Finch	—N/a	Sculpture	—N/a	
More images	Diogenist	Golders Hill Park 51.56784°N 0.18423°W		Mark Batten	—N/a	Sculpture	—N/a	

== Hendon ==
Image	Title / subject	Location and coordinates	Date	Artist / designer	Type	Designation	Notes
	Statue of Robert Peel	Hendon Police College 51.5941°N 0.2403°W	1855	William Behnes	Statue	Grade II	
More images	Hendon War Memorial	Junction of Watford Way and the Burroughs 51.5856°N 0.2303°W	1922		Memorial cross	Grade II	Unveiled 23 April 1922.
More images	Family of Man	Hendon Town Hall, The Burroughs 51.58835°N 0.22879°W	1981	Itzhak Ofer	Sculpture	—N/a	Unveiled by Prime Minister Margaret Thatcher. Commemorates the twinning of Barnet with Ramat Gan, Israel
	Sky Dance	RAF Museum 51.59739°N 0.23785°W	2003	Kisa Kawakami	Sculpture	—N/a	
	No. 601 Squadron RAF Memorial	RAF Museum	2009	Sam Bofey	Sculpture	—N/a	Unveiled 13 May 2009.

== Mill Hill ==
Image	Title / subject	Location and coordinates	Date	Artist / designer	Type	Designation	Notes
	Gate of Honour	Mill Hill School 51.6192°N 0.2303°W	1920	Stanley Hinge Hamp	Propylaeum	Grade II	Unveiled 30 October 1920.
More images	Mill Hill War Memorial	The Ridgeway 51.6209°N 0.2326°W	1920	Frank E. Whiting	Pylon	Grade II	Unveiled 14 November 1920.
More images	Middlesex Regiment War Memorial	The Ridgeway 51.6203°N 0.2318°W	1922	?	Obelisk	Grade II	Unveiled 5 November 1922 at Inglis Barracks by the Prince of Wales (the future Edward VIII). Moved to this site in 2012.
More images	Civic Pride	Fiveways Corner 51.6011°N 0.2342°W	2001	David Annand	Sculptures	—N/a	

== Monken Hadley ==
Image	Title / subject	Location and coordinates	Date	Artist / designer	Type	Designation	Notes
More images	Hadley Highstone Commemorates the Battle of Barnet	Great North Road 51.66584°N 0.19895°W	c. 1740		Obelisk	Grade II	
	David Livingstone	Livingstone Cottage, Hadley Green Road 51.6608°N 0.1969°W	1913	?	Portrait medallion	Grade II	
More images	Monken Hadley War Memorial	Monken Hadley Common, Camlet Way 51.6622°N 0.1922°W	1920	Mr Callard	Memorial cross	Grade II	Unveiled 19 December 1920 by Lieutenant-Colonel Francis Fremantle. Apparently inspired by a 15th-century market cross in Inveraray, Argyll, Scotland.

== New Barnet ==
Image	Title / subject	Location and coordinates	Date	Artist / designer	Type	Designation	Notes
More images	New Barnet War Memorial	Junction of Station Road and Lytton Road 51.6497°N 0.1753°W	1921	Newbury Abbot Trent	War memorial with sculpture	Grade II	Unveiled 20 March 1921.

== Totteridge ==
Image	Title / subject	Location and coordinates	Date	Artist / designer	Type	Designation	Notes
More images	Totteridge War Memorial	Junction of Totteridge Lane and Barnet Lane 51.6335°N 0.2010°W	1922	Charles Carrick Allom	Memorial cross	Grade II	Unveiled 26 March 1922.
