= Peter Hollins =

Peter Hollins may refer to:

- Peter Hollins (sculptor) (1800–1886), British sculptor
- Peter Hollins (businessman) (born 1947), British businessman

== See also ==
- Peter Hollens, American singer-songwriter, producer and entrepreneur
