= Catherine Loveday =

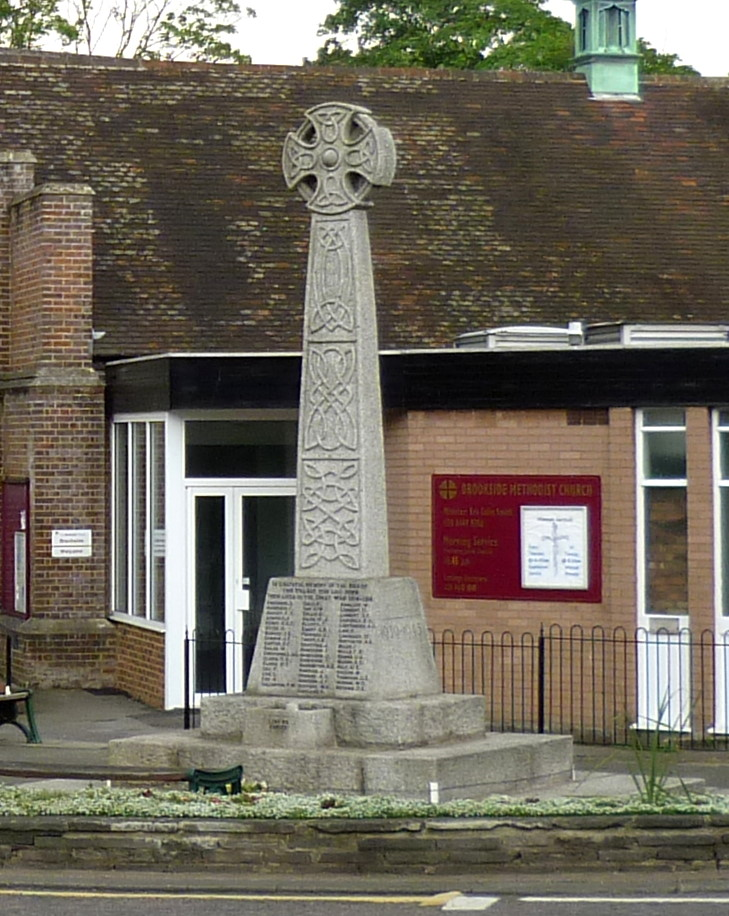
East Barnet war memorial

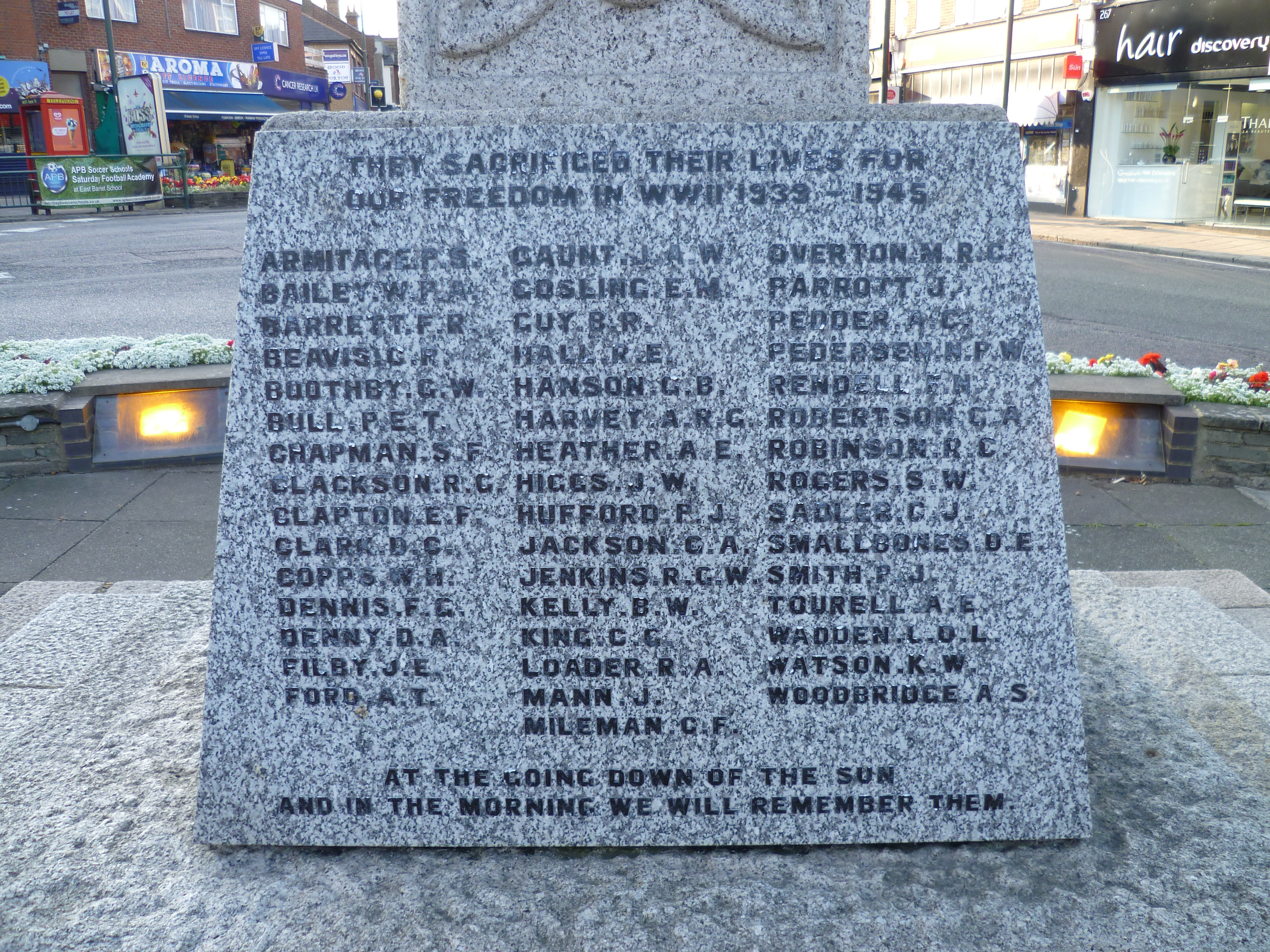
The plaque added to East Barnet war memorial for men killed in the Second World War. Catherine Loveday's father, S. F. Chapman, on the left.

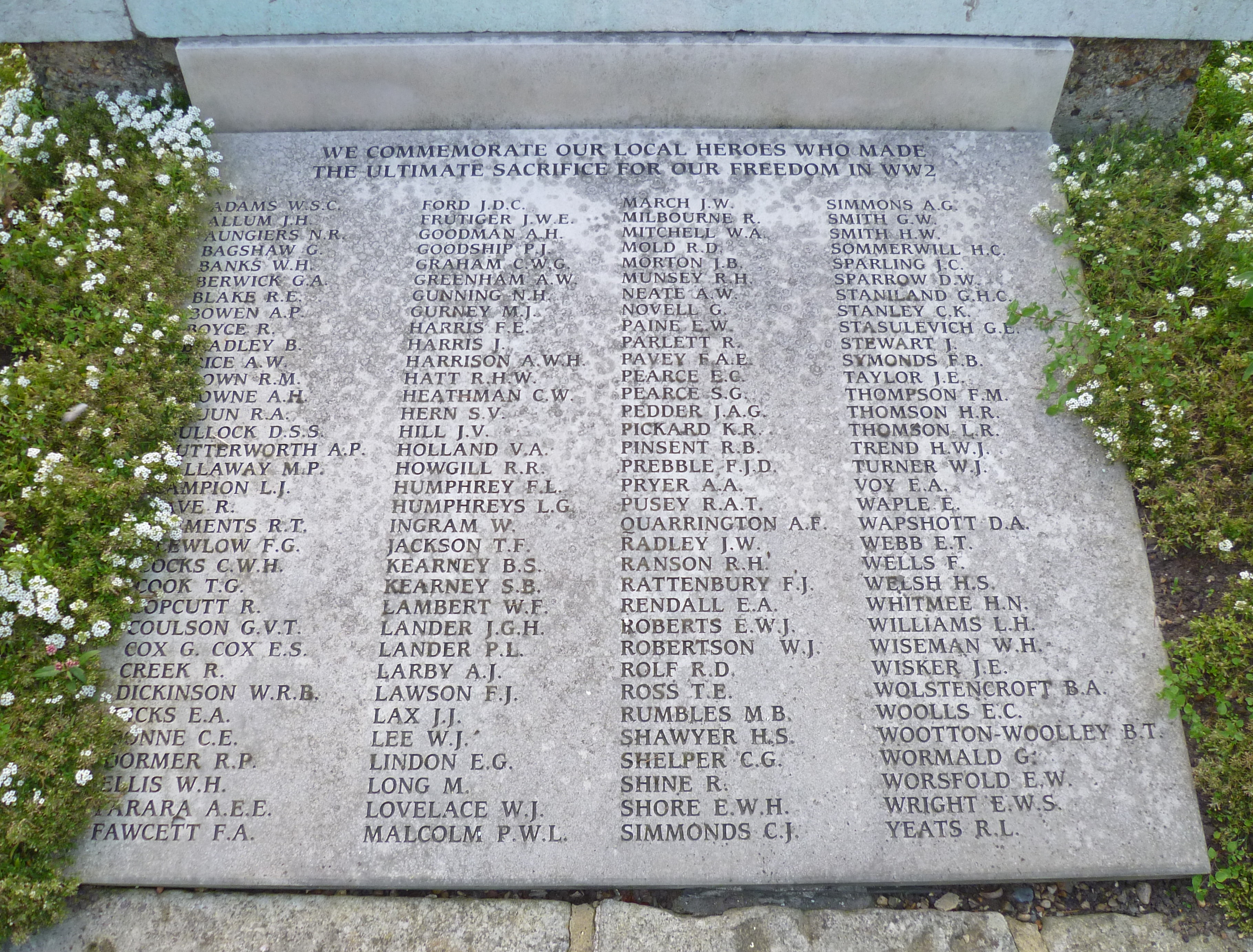
The plaque added to New Barnet war memorial in 2011 as a result of Loveday's campaign

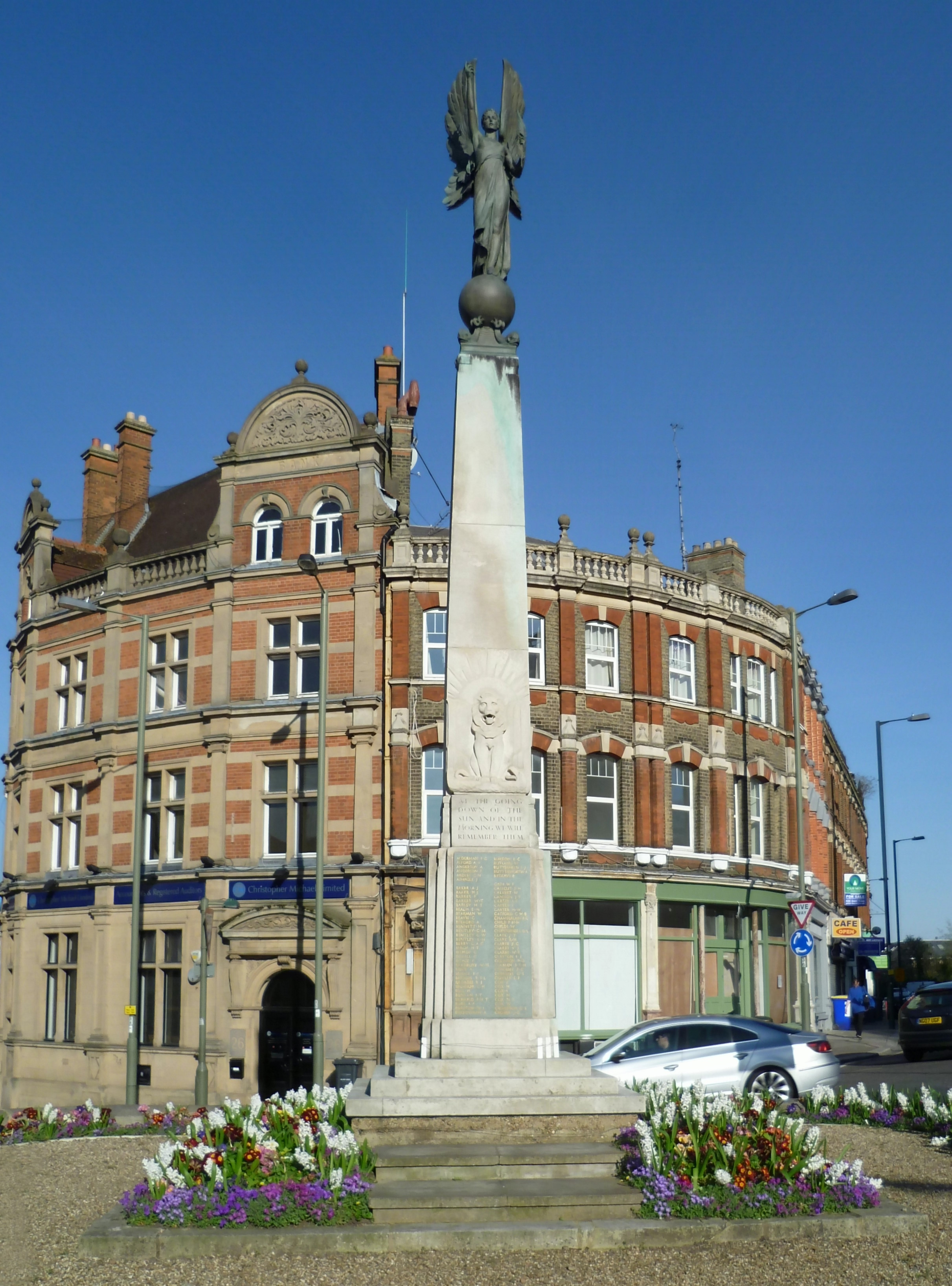
New Barnet war memorial in 2015.

Catherine Iris Pamela Loveday (born 1938) is an English campaigner for the recognition of the dead on London war memorials. Her work has resulted in the addition of names to the East Barnet, New Barnet and Hendon war memorials.

== Early life ==
Catherine Loveday was born in June 1938. She is the daughter of Stanley Frederick Chapman of East Barnet, who died on 20 May 1941 during the Second World War. He was serving as a gunner with the 6/3 Maritime Regiment of the Royal Artillery. He was the son of Frederick George and Emma Ada Chapman, and the husband of Alice May Chapman of New Barnet. His name is recorded on the Chatham Naval Memorial.

Catherine Loveday was educated at East Barnet Grammar School (1949–54) where she was known as Iris Chapman. She left school after completing her O levels and did not undertake further study at that time.

== Later life ==
Loveday married and had a son and a daughter. One of her jobs was as an educational adviser to science students at the Open University. She married twice, for the second time to George, around 1986, and acquired three stepsons. She enrolled at the Open University and earned her BA at the age of 50 and her BSc (Hons) five years later.

== Campaigning ==
As a child, the failure of the East Barnet war memorial to mention her father puzzled Loveday, so in later life, she launched a campaign to have his name added to the memorial, which it was in 1995. At that time, it was the only Second World War name to be included, but Loveday later succeeded in having a further 35 men added. She then moved on to the memorials at New Barnet and Hendon.

In 2011, Loveday succeeded in having the names of 136 men added to the New Barnet memorial on a new plaque made of Portland stone. In August 2015, she managed to have the names of 228 men added to the Hendon war memorial. In September 2015, the memorial was rededicated in a special service. The new Hendon plaque was designed by John Tebb of High Barnet whose brother, Frederick George Tebb, is named on the memorial. Loveday has identified a further 1,000 names to be added to the Finchley memorial and 500 more for the Edgware memorial, and is raising funds to pay for plaques for both.

== Awards ==
In March 2011, Loveday received a Civic Award from the London Borough of Barnet in recognition of her work.

== Appointments ==
Loveday is a trustee of the Barnet War Memorials Association.
