= East Barnet School =

Location
- 5 Chestnut Grove; East Barnet, London, EN4 8PU; England; 51.64446°N 0.15453°W

Information
- Type: Academy
- Mottoes: "I want to learn" "Do the right thing"
- Established: April 1937
- Founder: Allan Clayton
- Department for Education URN: 136658 Tables
- Ofsted: Reports
- Headteacher: Leann Swaine, BSc, MA, NPQH
- Staff: 240+
- Gender: Co-educational
- Age: 11 to 18
- Enrolment: 1,400+
- Houses: Chama, Keller, Murray, Tutu
- Colours: Maroon/Blue Tie; Maroon Kilt; Black Blazer/Trouser; White Shirt
- Nickname: EBS
- Website: https://www.eastbarnetschool.com

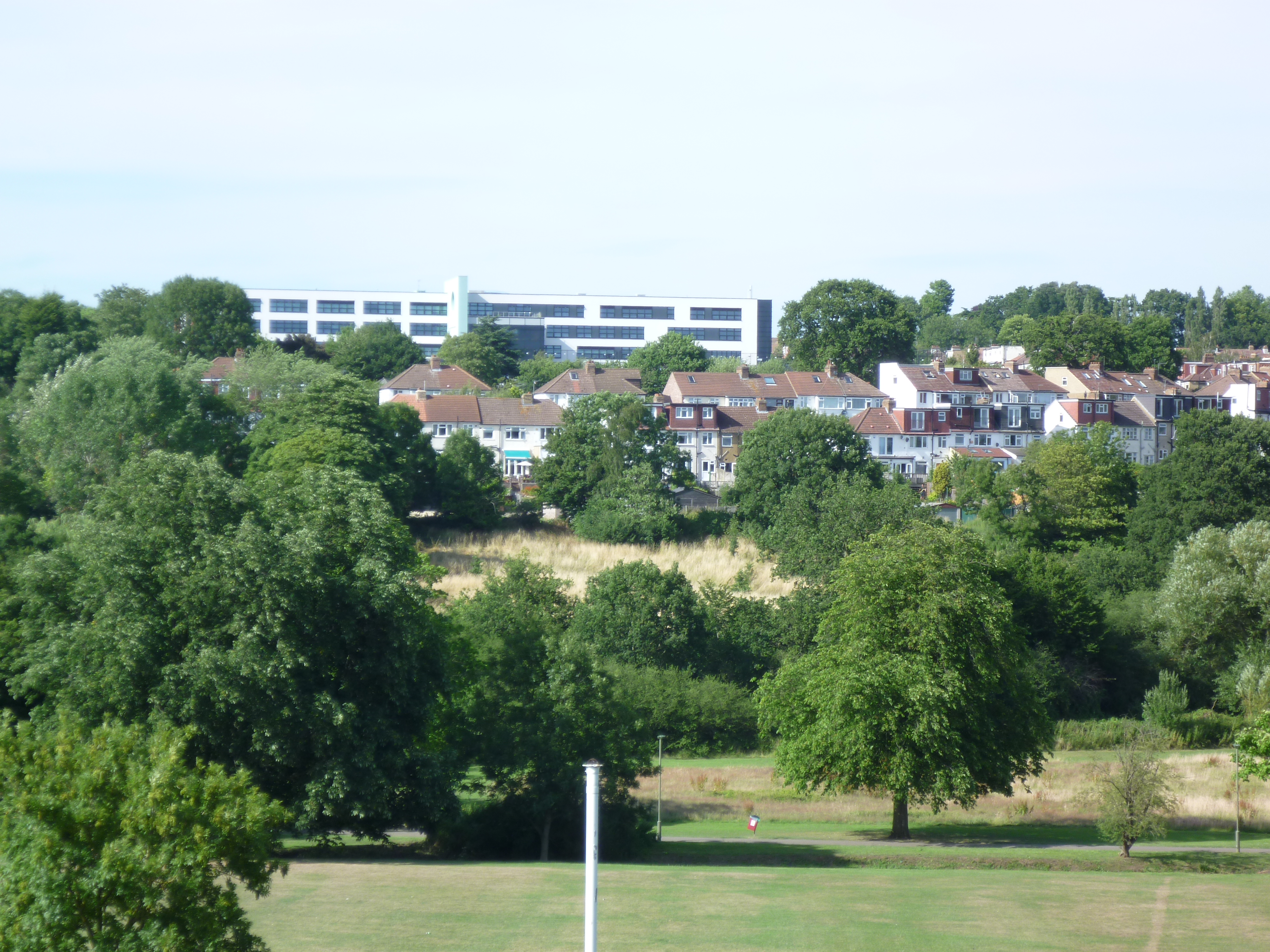
The view of the new building of East Barnet School from Oak Hill Park.

East Barnet School is a secondary school with academy status at Chestnut Grove in East Barnet, London, England. It has a specialism in technology, and is a Leadership Partner School.

== History ==
There has been a school on the current site since 1937. East Barnet Modern School opened in January of that year, when Allan Clayton was appointed Headteacher to prepare for the arrival of sixty four students in April, mostly as transfers from other secondary schools. They were not in the same age group, but spread over four years, so that each Form was extremely small. By September 1937, the school had two hundred students, with an initial two form entry. The school was renamed East Barnet County School in 1939, then in 1945, to reflect the curriculum and academic standards, renamed once more and became East Barnet Grammar School.

The original premises had been built to accommodate three hundred and fifty students, but by 1947, it was housing five hundred and forty seven. Various additions of classrooms and science laboratories were made between 1948 and 1958 and major building work between 1961 and 1965 added a new assembly hall, gymnasium, music rooms and a dining hall.

Due to local government reorganisation, on 1 April 1965 the school ceased to be a Hertfordshire County Council school, and became part of the new London Borough of Barnet.

In September 1971, East Barnet Grammar School had another name change, becoming known as East Barnet Senior High School, a comprehensive school for pupils aged 14–18. At the same time, the John Hampden School in Westbrook Crescent, New Barnet, became East Barnet Junior High School. Students automatically transferred from the junior to the senior school at the end of their third year.

In 1976 the two schools were combined as East Barnet School, an 11–18 co-educational comprehensive, operating from two sites: the Lower School (Westbrook Crescent) and Upper School (Chestnut Grove). In the late 1980s the usage of the two sites was swapped. Students in Years 7 to 10 were now on the Chestnut Grove site and Years 11 to 13 were at the Westbrook Crescent site.

In 2005, JCoSS, the Jewish Community Secondary School put forward a bid to the DfES to obtain the Westbrook Crescent site and for the government to pay for a new £46 million Jewish school on this site. Barnet Council agreed as long as the old Chestnut Grove site was rebuilt. The earliest possible date for a new school was 2009. The bid was rejected in autumn 2005.

In February 2006, it was announced that JCoSS had been chosen to be part of a government pilot scheme pilot to help parents influence new school provision. The Barnet Times reported that East Barnet School would be rebuilt on the Chestnut Grove site by September 2007 and JCoSS would open on the Westbrook Crescent site in September 2009.

Planning applications for both schools (East Barnet & JCoSS) were submitted to Barnet Council in May 2007. On both sites, new buildings were constructed on land that had been playing fields. This was to enable East Barnet School to continue to operate during the construction phase. Following completion of the new school buildings, the original buildings were demolished and replaced by all weather sports pitches and car parking facilities.

In May 2007, the Barnet Times reported that the transport and environment implications of the JCoSS plan were the subject of a campaign, spearheaded by local residents who formed the Barnet Safe Children & Environment Group.

Planning permission for the redevelopment of the Chestnut Grove site by East Barnet School was granted in July 2007. It was reported that construction was due to start in January 2008, with the school occupying the new building from September 2009.

Planning permission for the redevelopment of the Westbrook Crescent site by JCoSS was granted by Barnet's planning committee in August 2007. The public gallery and three committee rooms at Hendon Town Hall were packed by opponents and supporters of the scheme. The Barnet Times reported that the new Jewish school would open in September 2010.

In January 2008, it was reported that Barnet Council had stopped the architects working on the design of East Barnet School because of concerns over an alleged budget overrun of £6 million. Building Design Partnership denied that there was a problem and could deliver the £25 million project on budget. The opening of the new Chestnut Grove building would be delayed until 2010. JCoSS did not believe that the delay would affect their plans for the Westbrook Crescent site, although they still had to raise £50 million.

A fresh planning application for the East Barnet School building was submitted by new architects Frank Shaw Associates Ltd in April 2008. The new design follows the same basic site layout as before, but the curved glass roofed elliptical building is replaced by a simple oblong box. The plans were agreed by the borough planning committee in June 2008.

The new building was completed in May 2010 and work on the grounds and remaining sports areas continued until December 2010. Students and staff transferred into the school in June 2010. The Westbrook Crescent site was taken over by JCoSS, a newly built Jewish Community Secondary School, which also opened its doors to new students in the same year.

The Project Faraday science facilities at East Barnet School were opened by Nobel Laureate Sir Tim Hunt F.R.S. on 5 October 2010. The current East Barnet School building was officially opened on 15 March 2011 by H.R.H. The Duke of Gloucester K.G. G.C.V.O. There were representatives present from all year groups since the first student intake of 1937.

== Headteachers ==
- Ms L Swaine (2018–present)
- Mr Nick Christou (1998–2018)
- Mr Richard D. Hurdman (1971–98)
- Mr Angus Johnston (1960–71)
- Mr Allan Clayton (1937–60)

== Chair of Governors ==
- Mr John Ireton (2018–present)
- Mr Christopher Costigan (2014–17)
- Mr Nicholas Mottershead (2011–14)
- Mr Jonathan Hewlings (2006–11)
- Mrs Flo Armstrong (2001–06)

== Notable former pupils ==
East Barnet Grammar School

- Prof John Stollery CBE FREng FRAeS (1930–2013), President from 1987 to 1988 of the Royal Aeronautical Society, and Professor of Aerodynamics from 1973 to 1995 at Cranfield University
- John Wrighton MB, BS, FRCS (10 March 1933–), who won two gold medals at the 1958 European Championships in Stockholm, Sweden: in the men's individual 400 metres and in the 4x400 metres relay. He also represented Great Britain at the 1960 Summer Olympics in Rome, Italy and was Team Captain, reaching the quarter-finals in the 400 metres, and came fifth in the 4 x 400 metres final.
- Alan Coren – (27 June 1938 – 18 October 2007) was an English humourist, writer and satirist who was well known as a regular panellist on the BBC radio quiz The News Quiz and a team captain on BBC television's Call My Bluff. Coren was also a journalist, and for nine years was the editor of Punch magazine.
- Leonard Lewis, produced When the Boat Comes In and Juliet Bravo
- Oonagh McDonald CBE (1938–), Labour MP from 1976 to 1987 for Thurrock
- Catherine Loveday, campaigner for the recognition of the dead on London war memorials
- Peter Hollins (1947–), Chief Executive from 1998 to 2001 of British Energy, and from 2003 to 2013 of the British Heart Foundation
- Andrew Seber CBE MA (1950-) Chief Education Officer for Hampshire 1998 to 2005, national president Confederation of Education Service Managers 2002 to 2004, governor National College for School Leadership 2006 to 2010
