= John Stollery =

British engineer

John Stollery CBE FREng Hon FRAeS
- Born: 21 April 1930; Sible Hedingham, Essex, England
- Died: 28 June 2013 (aged 83)

Academic background
- Education: East Barnet School
- Alma mater: Imperial College London

Academic work
- Discipline: Aeronautical engineering
- Institutions: De Havilland; Imperial College London; Cranfield Institute of Technology

Professor John Leslie Stollery, CBE, FREng, Hon FRAeS (21 April 1930 – 28 June 2013) was a British engineer and academic. He was Professor of Aerodynamics at Cranfield University. He served as president of the Royal Aeronautical Society from 1987 to 1988 and Editor-in-Chief of its The Aeronautical Journal from 1996 to 2006. He pioneered the 'Gun Tunnel' that is widely used in aerospace engineering.

== Early life ==
Stollery was born on 21 April 1930 in Sible Hedingham, Essex, England, to Edgar and Emma Stollery. He was educated at East Barnet Grammar School, North London from 1941 to 1948. He sat the School Certificate and the Higher School Certificate. He went on to study aeronautical engineering at Imperial College London. In 1951, he graduated with a Bachelor of Science (BSc) degree and stayed to complete a Master in Science (MSc) in 1953.

== Career ==
In 1952, he joined the Aerodynamics Department at De Havilland. However, he left the company in 1956 to return to academia.

In 1956, he was appointed lecturer in aerodynamics in the Department of Aeronautics at his alma mater Imperial College London. He worked with Donald Campbell as a part of the design team on both the Bluebird car and boat projects. There was a need to develop new test facilities as flight speeds increased and so he developed the 'Gun Tunnel'. He was promoted to Reader in Aerodynamics in 1962, in recognition of this important innovation. He was visiting professor at the Cornell Aeronautical Laboratory, Buffalo, New York, USA in 1964 and at the Air Force Research Laboratory, Wright-Patterson Air Force Base, Ohio in 1971.

In 1973, he was appointed to a Chair, as Professor of Aerodynamics, at Cranfield Institute of Technology (now Cranfield University). He served as head of the Institute's College of Aeronautics from 1976 to 1986. He served as Dean of the Faculty of Engineering between 1976 and 1979. He was Visiting Professor at the National Aeronautical Laboratory, Bangalore, India in 1977. He was Pro-Vice-Chancellor of the Institute between 1982 and 1985. He was Visiting Professor at the University of Queensland, Brisbane, Australia in 1983. He once more headed the College of Aeronautics from 1992 to 1995. He retired from academia in 1995 and became Professor Emeritus of Cranfield University.

Outside academia, he held positions on government committees and aviation related organisations. He was Chairman of the Defence Technology Board, Ministry of Defence between 1986 and 1989. He was Chairman of the Aviation Committee, Department of Trade and Industry between 1986 and 1994. He was president of the Royal Aeronautical Society from 1987 to 1988. From 1990 to 2000, he was a member of the Airworthiness Requirements Board of the Civil Aviation Authority.

== Later life ==
Following his retirement from academia, he served as Editor-in-Chief of the Royal Aeronautical Society's The Aeronautical Journal from 1996 to 2006.

Stollery died on 28 June 2013, aged 83.

== Honours ==
In 1972, he was awarded the higher doctorate Doctor of Science (DSc) in recognition of his collective research. In 1992, Stollery was elected Fellow of the Royal Academy of Engineering (FREng). In the 1994 Queen's Birthday Honours, he was appointed Commander of the Order of the British Empire (CBE) 'for services to the Aviation Industry'.

In February 2013, his former students, colleagues and friends held a one-day colloquium on "High-Speed Flows" in his honour. Participants came from as far afield as the USA, Japan and Korea.

Professional and academic associations
Preceded by John Fozard	President of the Royal Aeronautical Society; 1987–1988	Succeeded by Dr P.H Calder
