= Robin Jeffrey (businessman) =

Scottish engineer and businessman

Robin Campbell Jeffrey (19 February 1939 – 4 November 2018) was a Scottish engineer and businessman, who became executive chairman of British Energy.

== Early life ==
He was the son of Robert Jeffrey and Catherine Campbell McSporran. He attended Lenzie Academy and Kelvinside Academy, and studied for a BSc in Mechanical Engineering at the Royal College of Science and Technology (University of Strathclyde), where he was later a visiting professor, and a PhD at Pembroke College, Cambridge.

== Career ==
=== Babcock & Wilcox ===
1966–1979 Babcock and Wilcox Research Station, Renfrew.

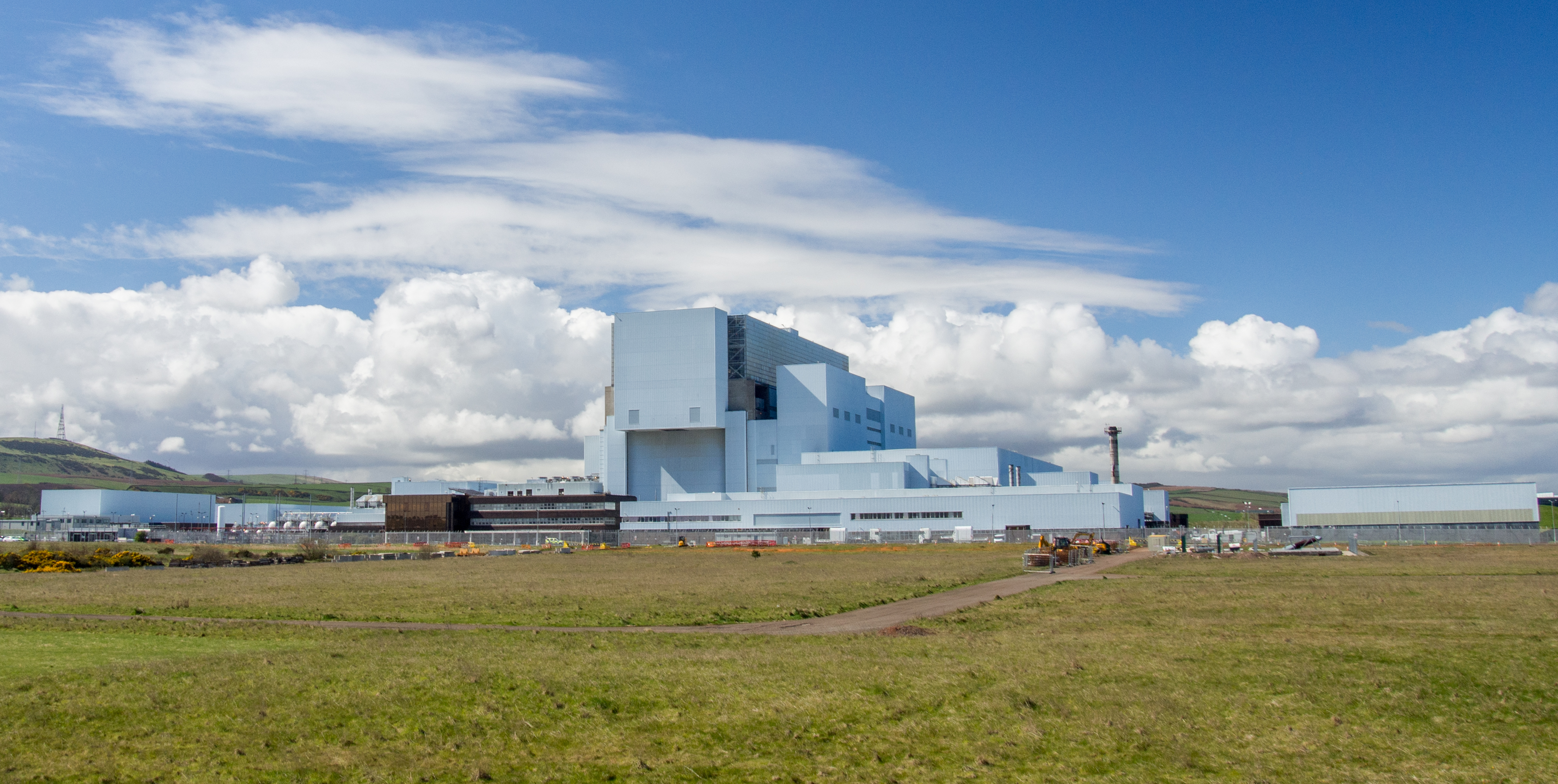
He was the Project Manager of Torness Nuclear Power Station, seen here in April 2016

=== South of Scotland Electricity Board ===
From 1980–88 he was the project manager for the design and construction of Torness Nuclear Power Station, which was delivered on time and to budget.

=== Scottish Nuclear ===
He was chief executive of Scottish Nuclear from 1992–1995.

=== British Energy ===
British Energy was formed in 1996 and he was deputy chairman from 1996–2001. He was chairman and chief executive of British Energy from June 2001 to November 2002.

=== London Regional Transport ===
Jeffrey was a non-executive board member of London Regional Transport.

== Personal life ==
He married in 1962 and has two sons and a daughter. He died on 4 November 2018 at the age of 79.

Business positions
Preceded by Peter Hollins	Executive Chairman of British Energy; June 2001 – November 2002	Succeeded by Sir Adrian Montague (Chairman); Mike Alexander (Chief Executive)
Preceded by	Chairman of Scottish Nuclear; 1995–1998	Succeeded by
Preceded by	Chief Executive of Scottish Nuclear; 1992–1995	Succeeded by
