= La Délivrance =

Sculpture by Émile Oscar Guillaume

Coordinates: 51.59090°N 0.20002°W

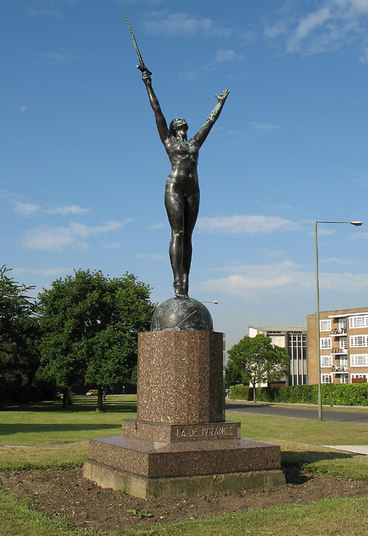
La Délivrance in Finchley, 2006

La Délivrance is a 1914 bronze statue by the French sculptor Émile Oscar Guillaume (1867–1942). The statue was created as a celebration of the First Battle of the Marne, when the German army was stopped before capturing Paris in August 1914.

A 4.9m high example of the work has been displayed on public land at Henly's Corner, a major road junction at the bottom of Regents Park Road at the southern edge of Finchley in north London, now in the London Borough of Barnet, since 1927. Another example has been located in the French city of Nantes since 1927.

== Statue ==
The statue was created by Guillaume in 1914, originally called La Victoire. It depicts a naked female figure standing on tip-toe with both feet on a bronze hemisphere. She lifts her face to the sky and holds both arms aloft, with a sword in her right hand.

== Finchley statue ==
In 1920 Guillaume exhibited his statue at the Paris Salon, where it won the Hors Concours Medal. It was bought by Lord Rothermere, who presented the statue to the Urban District of Finchley. However Finchley Council needed a war memorial to commemorate the First World War, and intended placing the new statue at the main entrance of Finchley's recreation ground, Victoria Park. Lord Rothermere, incensed by this, informed Finchley that the statue was to be placed at its present location, so that he might see it when driving to see his mother, who lived at Totteridge, or the council could not have it at all.

The statue was mounted on a granite plinth and was unveiled on 20 October 1927 in front of a crowd, believed to have been around 8,000 people, by the former prime minister, David Lloyd George.

The statue has had a number of local names including "Dirty Gertie", "The Wicked Woman", (due to corrosion before a restoration in 1938) "Gangrene Gertie" and (most popular – to the exclusion of its real name) "The Naked Lady".

The statue became a Grade II listed building in April 1983, upgraded to Grade II* in February 2016. An information panel was placed in front of the statue by the Finchley Society in September 2007.

== Nantes statue ==
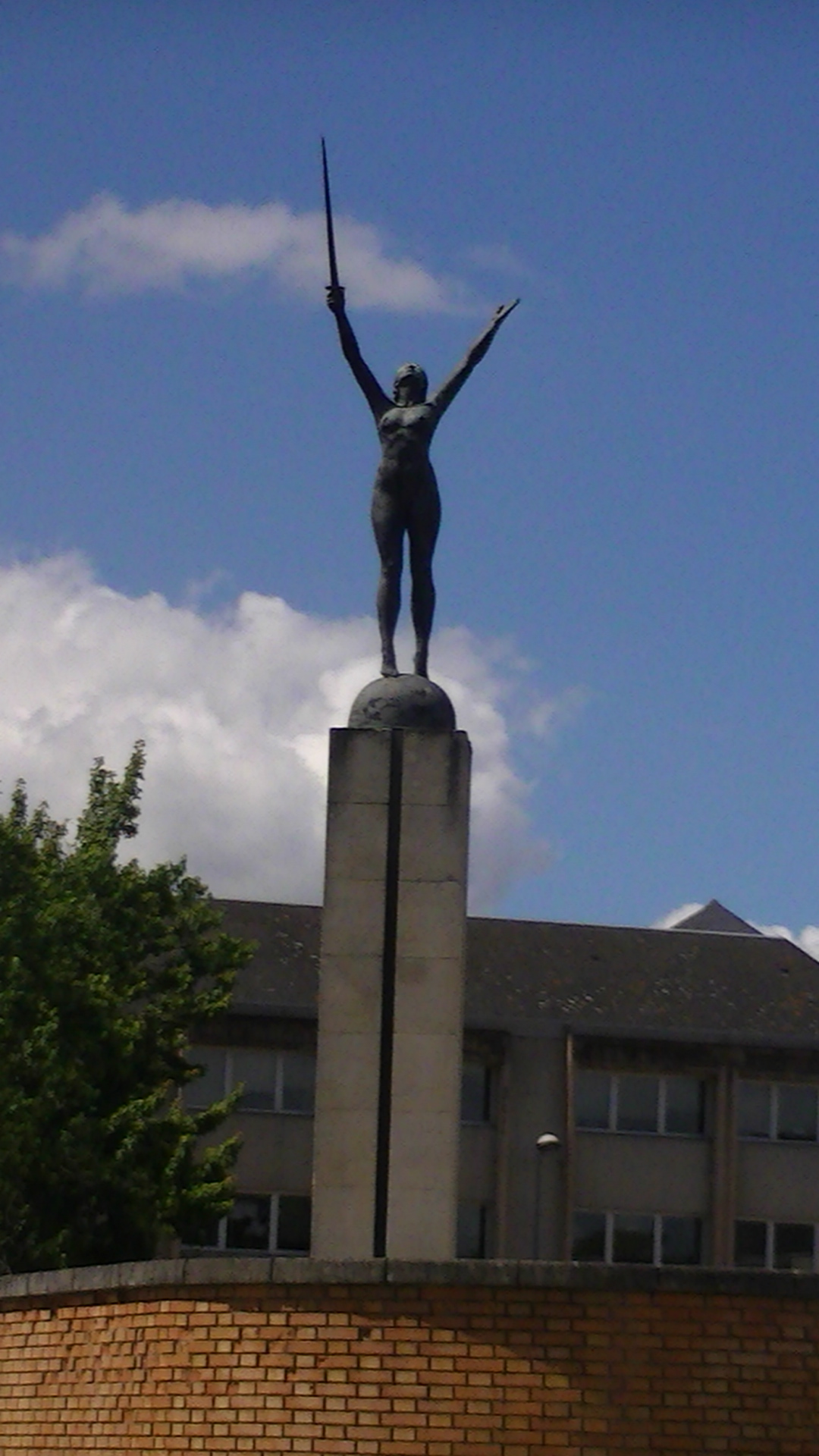
Statue in Nantes in 2012

On Friday, 17 October 1919, the French newspaper Le Matin announced that 11 copies of the statue, renamed La délivrance, would be created by the founders Maison F. Barbedienne and offered to 11 cities of France and Belgium, occupied or destroyed by the Germans: Amiens, Brussels, Colmar, Liège, Lille, Metz, Reims, Mézières, Saint-Quentin, Strasbourg, Verdun. The statues were cast in a variety of sizes, from 1.1 metres (3 ft 7 in) to 2.6 metres (8 ft 6 in) high.

The first of these statues was offered to Lille, greatest of the cities occupied during World War I. It was unveiled there on 19 October 1919 in a central public park, the Jardin Vauban in the Esquermes district. The nudity of the statue was a cause of trouble and led to withdrawal of the statue in the following years, and it was stored in the Palais Rameau.

In 1927, this copy was given to the city of Nantes and displayed beside the memorial tablets listing the city's war dead at the Quai Ceineray. After being removed and reinstalled at least twice, it has stood in its present position beside the Hôtel de region since 1987.

Another but smaller copy of the statue exists in the small French town of Chéroy, Yonne, and others may still exist in some of the French cities chosen in 1919.

== See also ==
- List of public art in the London Borough of Barnet
- Grade I and II* listed buildings in the London Borough of Barnet
- Grade II* listed war memorials in England
