= East Barnet War Memorial =

War memorial in London

Coordinates: 51°38′33″N 0°09′46″W

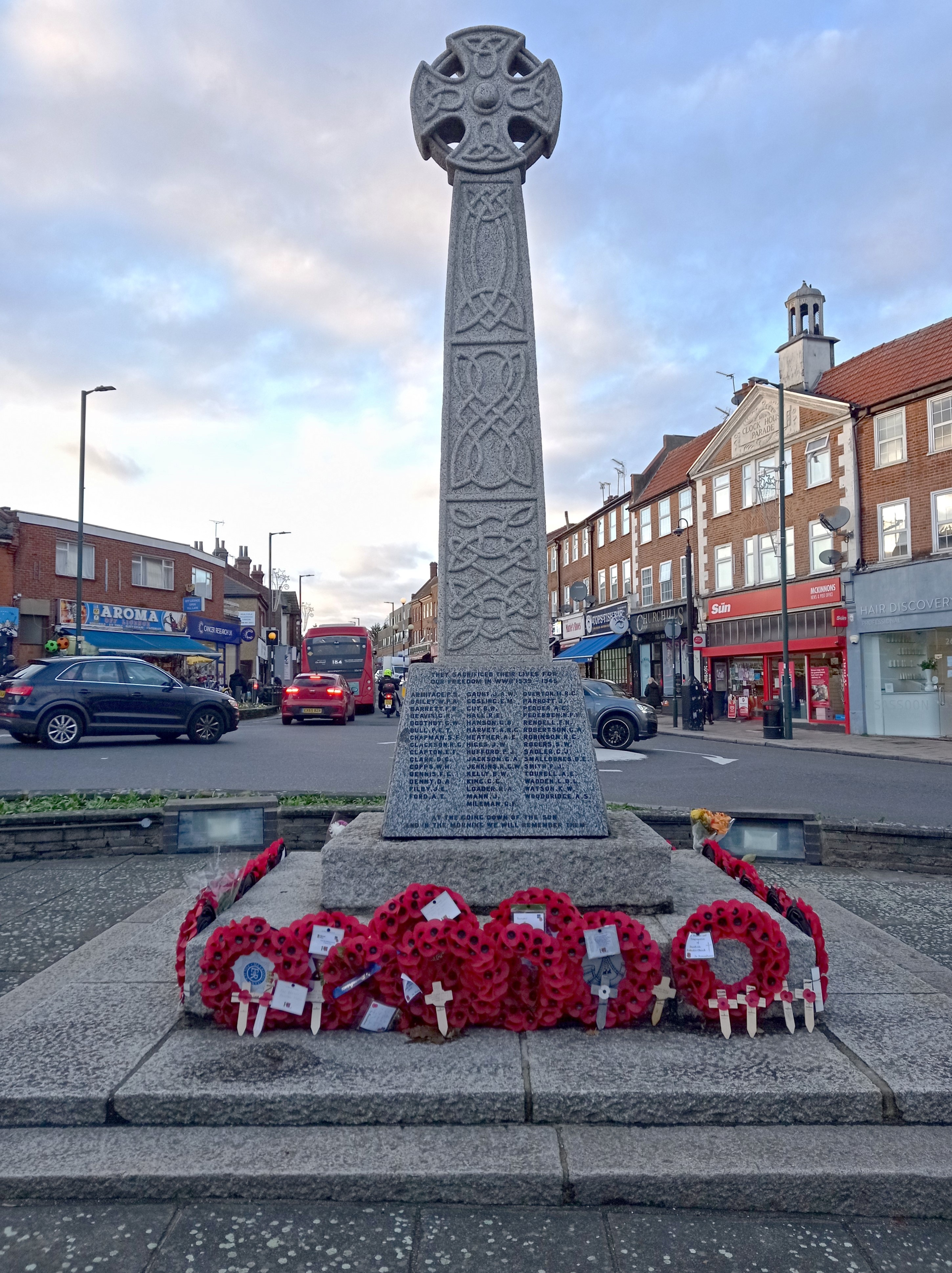
East Barnet War Memorial with 2023 Remembrance Day wreaths

East Barnet War Memorial is a memorial to the dead of the First and Second World Wars from East Barnet, London. It was unveiled on 27 June 1920 and originally stood on the crossroads of East Barnet Road and Church Hill Road, but was later moved a short distance so that it now stands in front of the Brookside Methodist Church.

== Catherine Loveday's campaign ==
As a child, Catherine Loveday was puzzled by the absence of her father's name on the East Barnet War Memorial, so in later life she launched a campaign to have his name added to the memorial, which it was in 1995. At that time, it was the only Second World War name to be included but Loveday later succeeded in having the names of a further 35 men added. She then moved on to the memorials at New Barnet and Hendon.

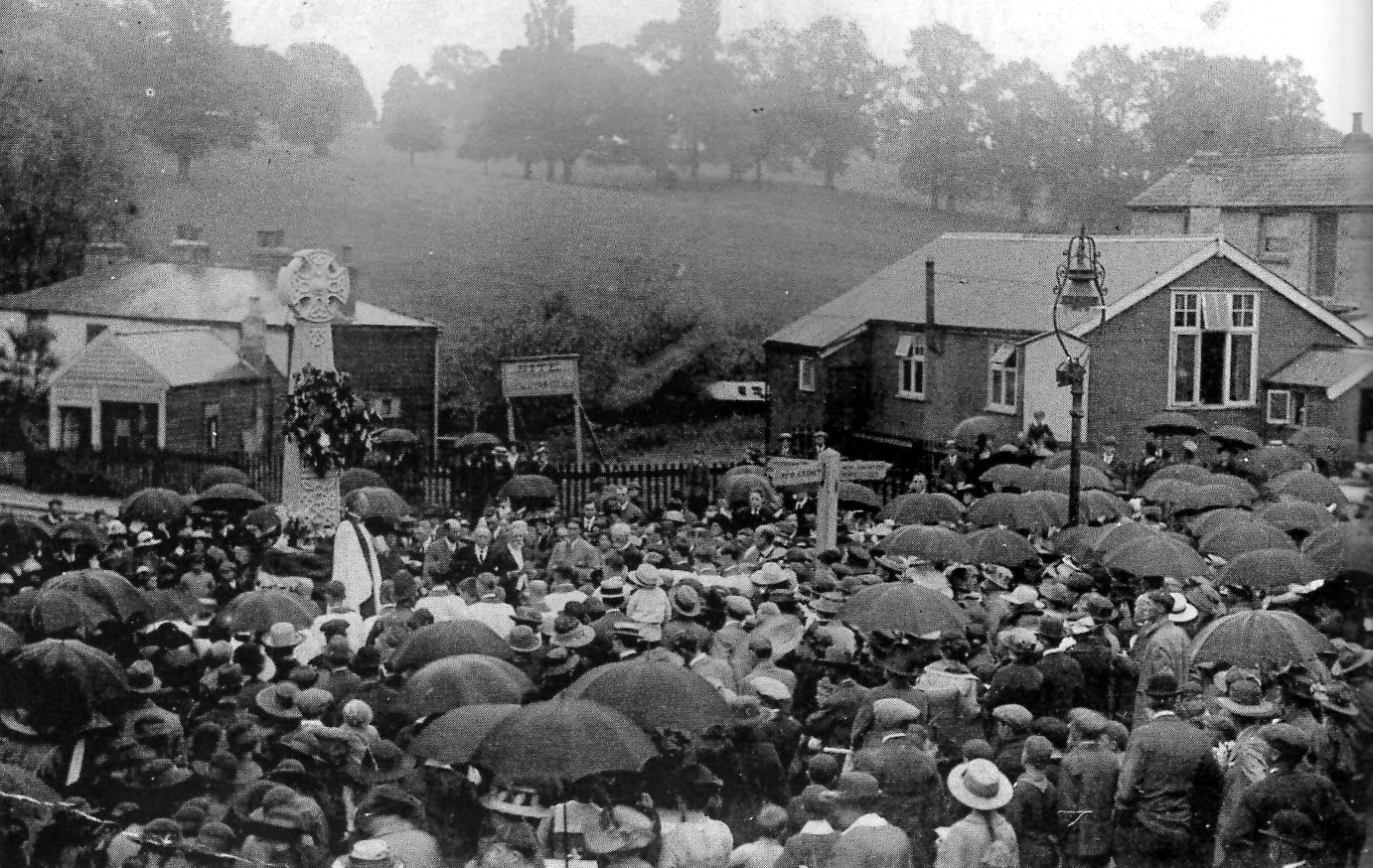
The unveiling of East Barnet war memorial, 27 June 1920.

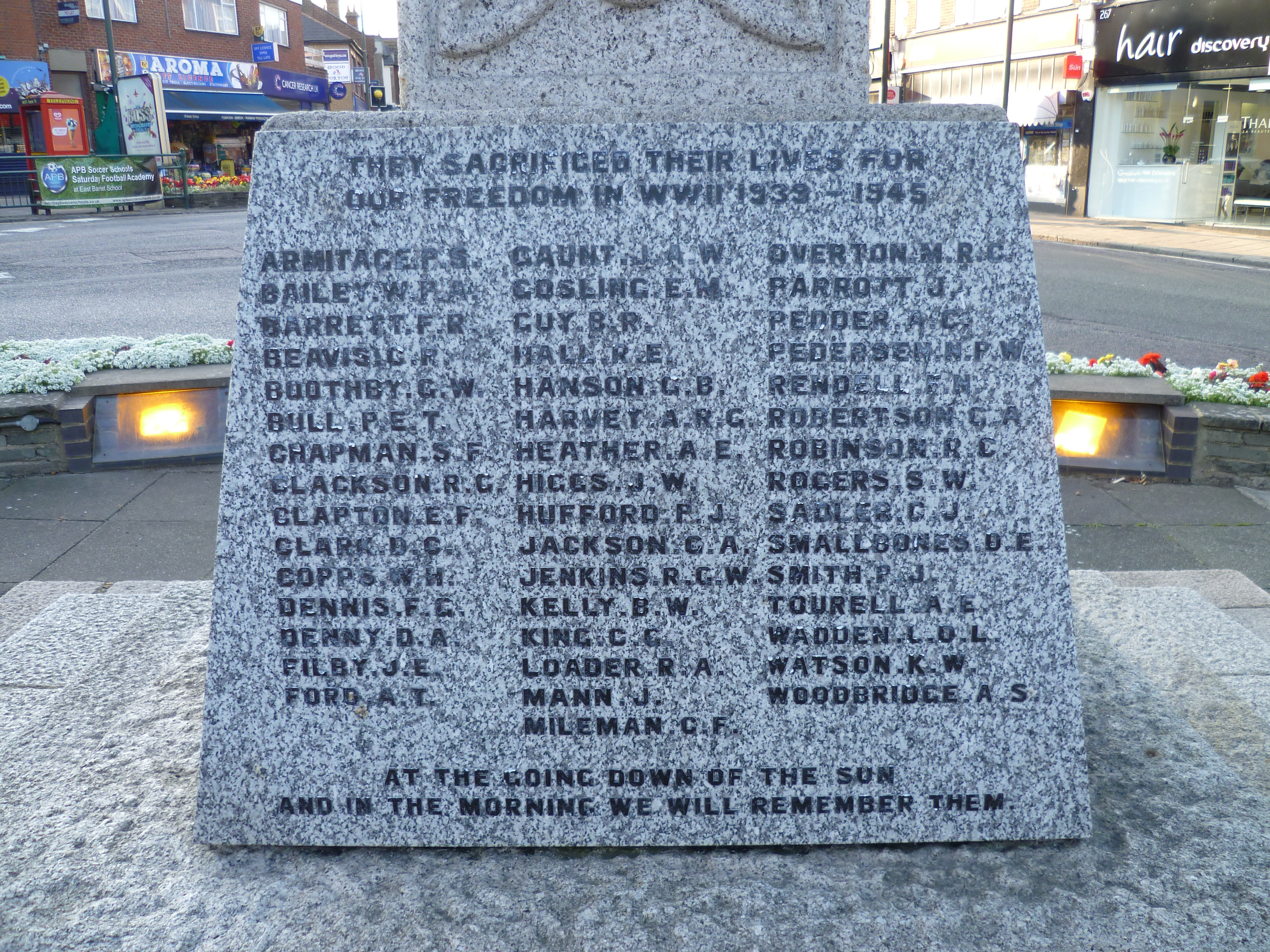
The plaque added to East Barnet war memorial for men killed in the Second World War. Catherine Loveday's father, S. F. Chapman, on the left.
