= Hendon War Memorial =

War memorial in London

Coordinates: 51.5856°N 0.2303°W

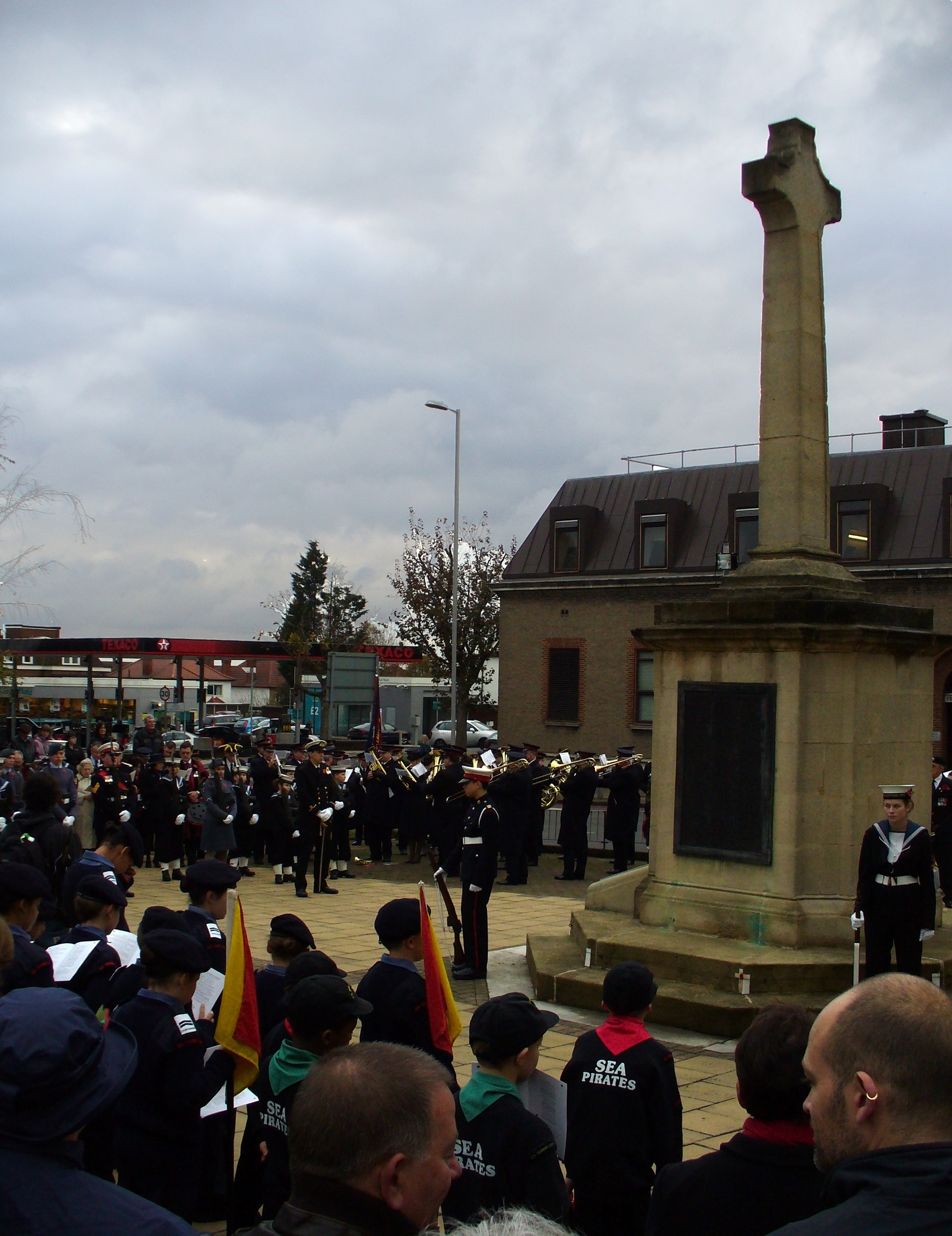
Hendon War Memorial, London. Remembrance Sunday 2009

Hendon War Memorial in Hendon, North London is located on the central reservation at the junction between Watford Way and The Burroughs. It was unveiled on St George's Day, 23 April 1922, but was moved to its present location in 1962.

== History of the area ==
By 1906, Sir Audley Neeld was building on the land that had been Renters Farm, starting with a new road from Station Road to Queens Road, later called Vivian Avenue. The eventual estate used many names associated with the family: Dallas, Audley, Elliot, Graham, Rundell, Vivian, Algernon and Neeld. Other names are associated with Neeld estates in Grittleton, including Alderton, Foscote, Sevington, and Allington.

Hendon Central Underground station and the Watford Way were constructed in 1923. Originally, the road was planned to cut through the Neeld Estate, but in January 1924 a local ratepayers' group in Hendon Central, backed by Hendon Urban District Council, petitioned the County Council and central government, and the route was changed so that it would pass up Queen's Road (better known now as Hendon Way).

== See also ==
- List of public art in Barnet
