= Arkley War Memorial =

War memorial in London

Coordinates: 51°38′52″N 0°13′55″W

- United Kingdom
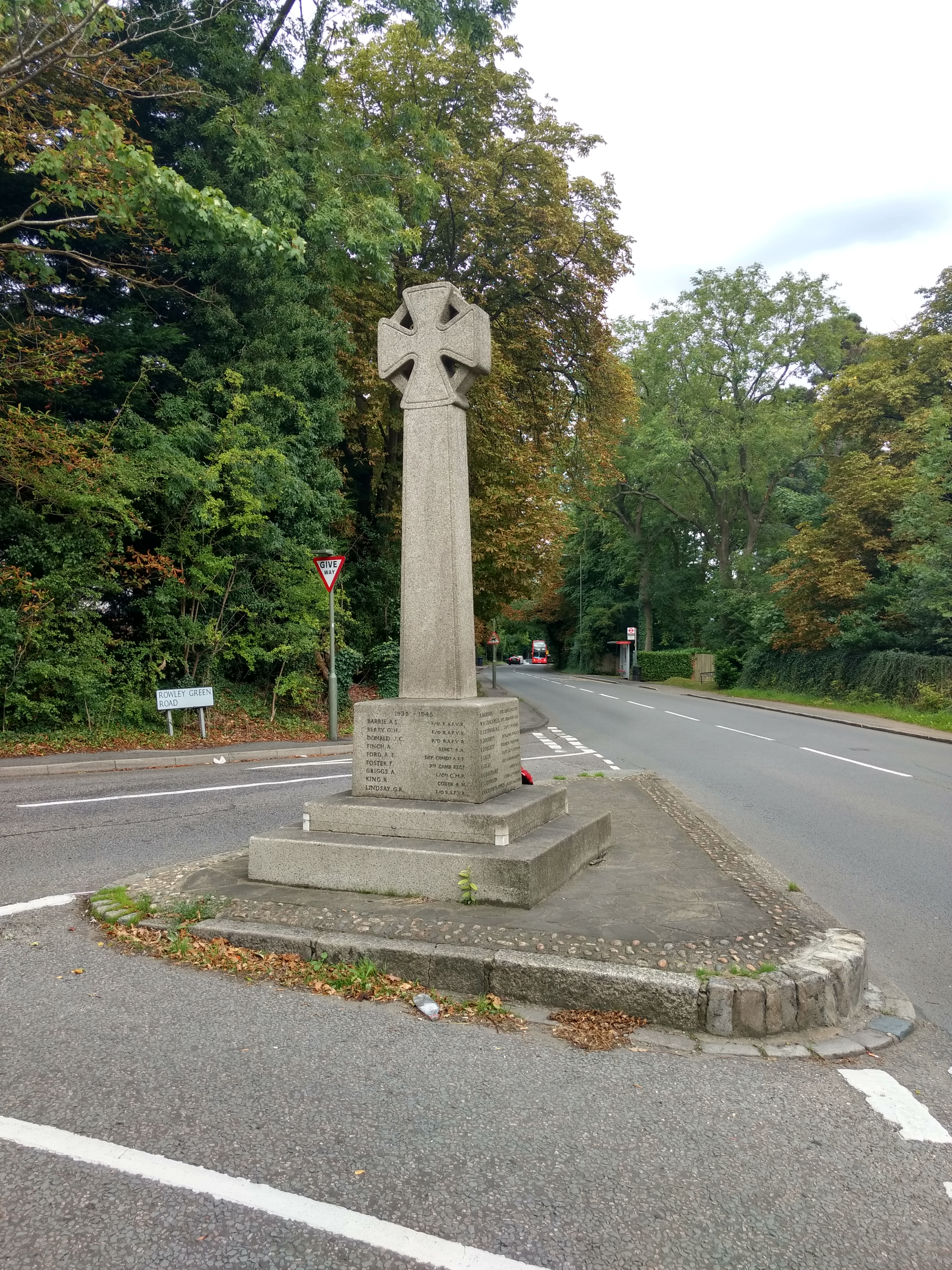
- For men from Fordham killed in the First and Second World War
- Unveiled: 1920
- Location: Arkley

Arkley War Memorial is a war memorial in Arkley, in the London Borough of Barnet. It was unveiled in 1920 to commemorate World War I, with later additions for World War II. It is grade II listed with Historic England.
