= St James the Great, Friern Barnet =

Church in north London, England

Coordinates: 51.6210°N 0.1636°W

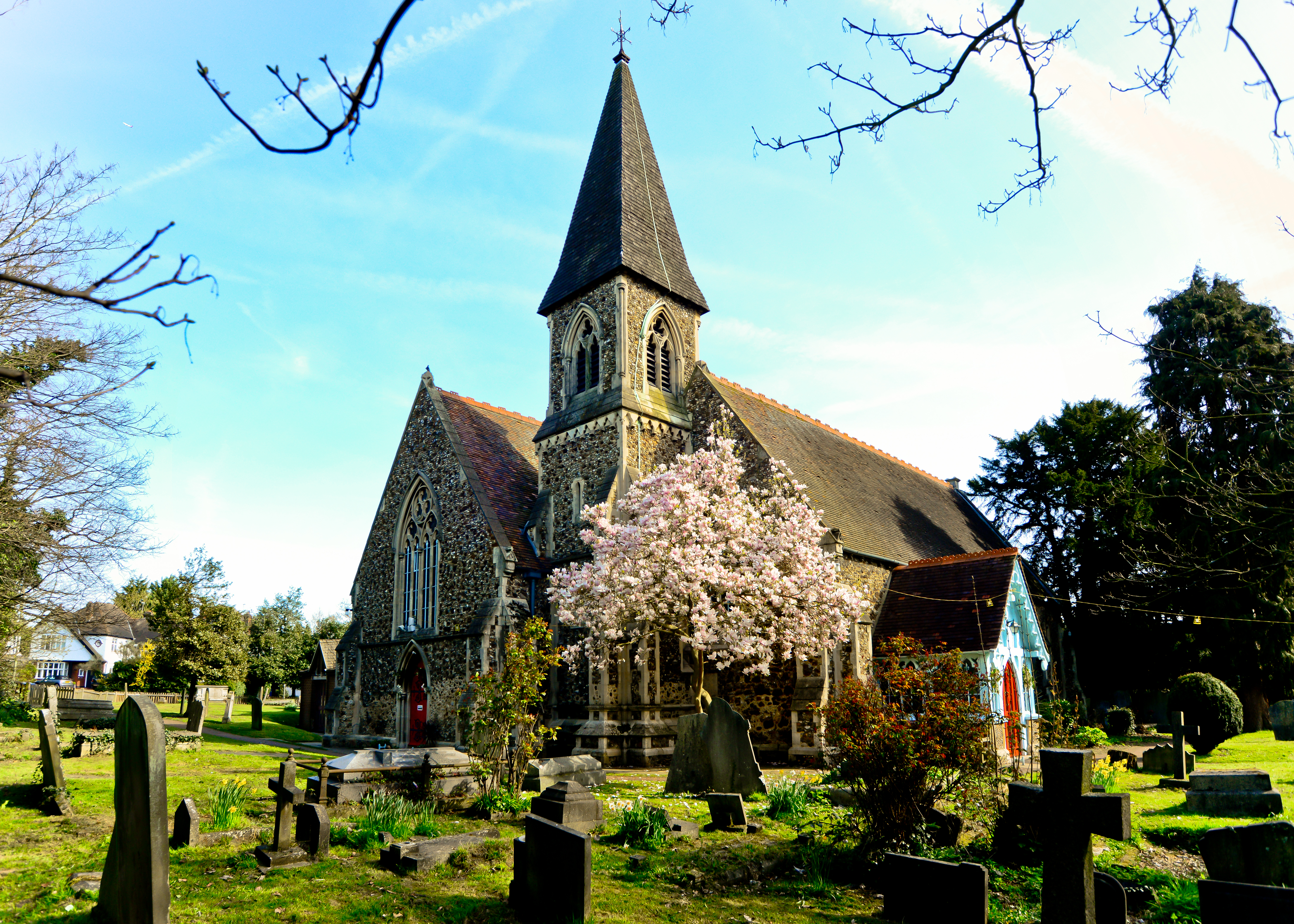
St James the Great, Friern Barnet

St James the Great, Friern Barnet, is a former Church of England church in Friern Barnet, north London. It is currently leased to the local Greek Orthodox community as St Katherine's. Church of England services for Friern Barnet have been transferred to St John the Evangelist on Friern Barnet Road.

== History and architecture ==
The church stands on the corner of Friern Barnet Lane and Friary Road. It is of medieval origin, with one Norman fragment, a much restored south doorway, surviving. The church as it exists today largely dates from a rebuilding of 1853 by the architects Edward and William Habershon. It consists of a nave, chancel, south aisle and porch, vestry, and a south-west tower with a spire. The exterior is of flint, with stone dressings.

The Friern Barnet Parishioners War Memorial stands in the churchyard.
