= Peter Hollins (businessman) =

British businessman

Peter Thomas Hollins (born 22 October 1947) is a British businessman, and a former chief executive of British Energy, which ran most of Britain's nuclear power stations, and was part of the FTSE 100 Index.

== Early life ==
He was born in Hendon, Middlesex. He attended East Barnet Grammar School (became the comprehensive East Barnet School in 1971). He attended Hertford College, Oxford, from 1966 to 1970, gaining a degree in chemistry.

== Career ==
Hollin's joined BOC in 1970, working there for three years.

=== ICI ===
He joined ICI in 1973, as part of their marketing department. In the late 1980s, he worked with halomethanes (these compounds destroyed the ozone layer), then moving in 1987 to ICI Soda Ash Products. From 1989 to 1992 he was General Manager of ICI Resins BV (ICI Holland at Waalwijk). He then worked for a joint venture of ICI and Enichem, of Italy, called European Vinyls Corporation (EVC Brussels), as Chief Operating Officer until 1998. The company was floated on the Amsterdam Stock Exchange in 1994. It was the world's biggest producer of PVC.

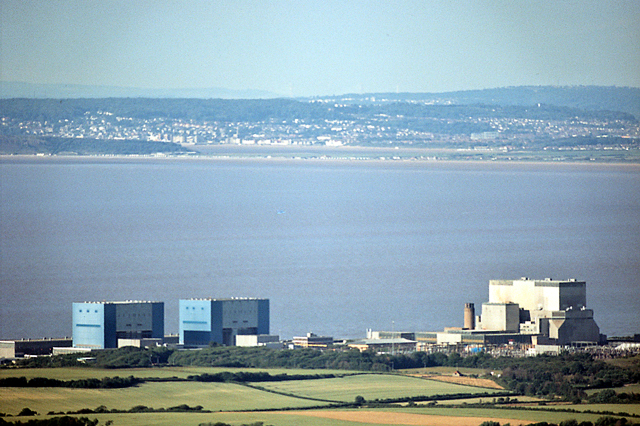
Hinkley Point A (left, closed in 2000) and B (right, still running) nuclear power stations in June 2004

=== British Energy ===
He became chief executive of British Energy in 1998. Nuclear Electric had become British Energy in 1996. On 7 June 2001 he resigned as chief executive. From 2000 to 2001 he earned £330,000.

=== British Heart Foundation ===
He became director general of the British Heart Foundation (BHF) in 2003, in this role until his departure in 2012.

=== NHS ===
In April 2016 he became chairman of the University Hospital Southampton NHS Foundation Trust.

== Personal life ==
He is fluent in Dutch, German and French. He married Linda Pitchford in 1973 in Barnet, they have two daughters (born 1977 and 1979), and live in Brockenhurst in south Hampshire. He has previously lived in Edinburgh.

== See also ==
- Nuclear power in the United Kingdom

Non-profit organization positions
Preceded by	Chairman of CLIC Sargent; September 2014 -	Succeeded by Incumbent
Preceded by	Chief Executive of the British Heart Foundation; November 2003 - March 2013	Succeeded by
Business positions
Preceded by Robert Hawley	Chief Executive of British Energy; February 1998 - June 2001	Succeeded by Robin Jeffrey
