= Christ Church Barnet =

Coordinates: 51.6587°N 0.2044°W

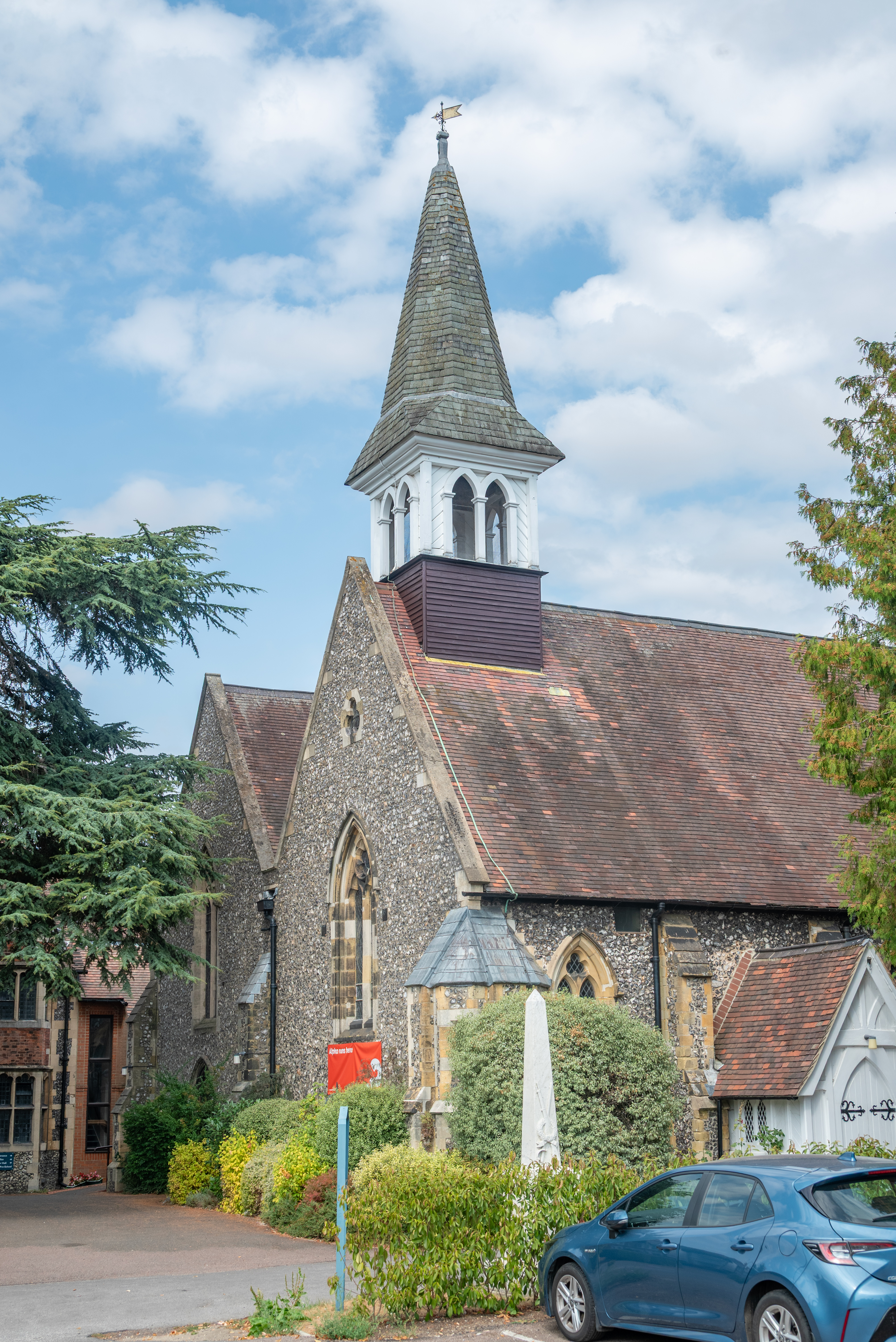
- Christ Church Barnet
- Christ Church Barnet
- Country: England
- Denomination: Church of England
- Website: www.ccbarnet.org.uk

Architecture
- Heritage designation: Grade II

Administration
- Diocese: London
- Archdeaconry: Hampstead
- Deanery: Central Barnet
- Parish: Christ Church Barnet

Clergy
- Vicar: Andy Rimmer

Christ Church Barnet, is a Church of England church in St Albans Road, Chipping Barnet.

== History ==
The church was designed by George Gilbert Scott and built between 1845 and 1852. It has been grade II listed on the National Heritage List for England since November 1982.

William Pennefather (1816-1873), the popular evangelist and author of several well-known hymns, was vicar here from 1852 to 1864, just after the village had been linked to central London by train. During those years the vicarage at Christ Church Barnet was a recognised centre of the Evangelical movement.

== Parish ==
The parish of Christ Church Barnet was founded in 1845 to serve the rapidly expanding population of High Barnet as a daughter church to St Giles Church, South Mimms, in the neighbouring Diocese of St Albans. It is one of the most northerly parishes on the edge of the London Diocese following boundary changes in 1965 when the church was transferred to the Edmonton area. Christ Church is not typical of a London parish since it is surrounded on two sides by parishes in the Diocese of St Albans. While on the one hand it is part of a typical commuter town, having access to links into and around London (being on the end of the Northern Line and close to a number of arterial roads – M25, A1M, M1), the major part of the land use is rural, made up of fields and green space (with three working farms and three golf courses). The populated part of the parish is in the High Barnet Ward and has a population of 4,750, made up of more than 3,000 residences, most of which are owner occupied. The parish is served by the Spires shopping centre, a public library, a market and three schools:

- Christ Church School
- Foulds Primary School
- Queen Elizabeth's School - a state funded boys grammar school

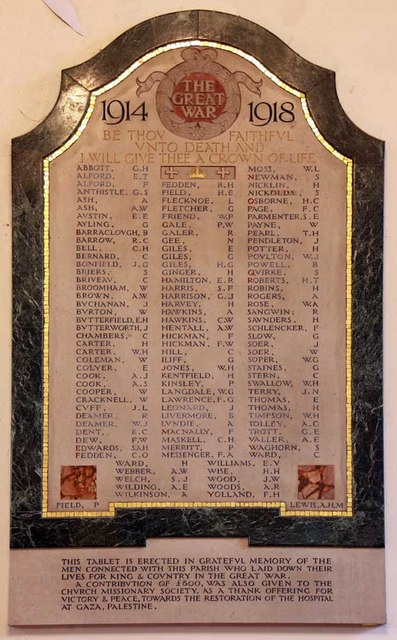
First World War wall monument

== Graves ==
The church's cemetery is on the opposite (western) side of St Albans Road, a short distance to the north, and contains a number of war graves. A memorial to former pupils of Barnet Boys School who died in the Second Boer War stands near the church. There is also a wall monument to deaths in the First World War, inside the church.

== Gallery ==
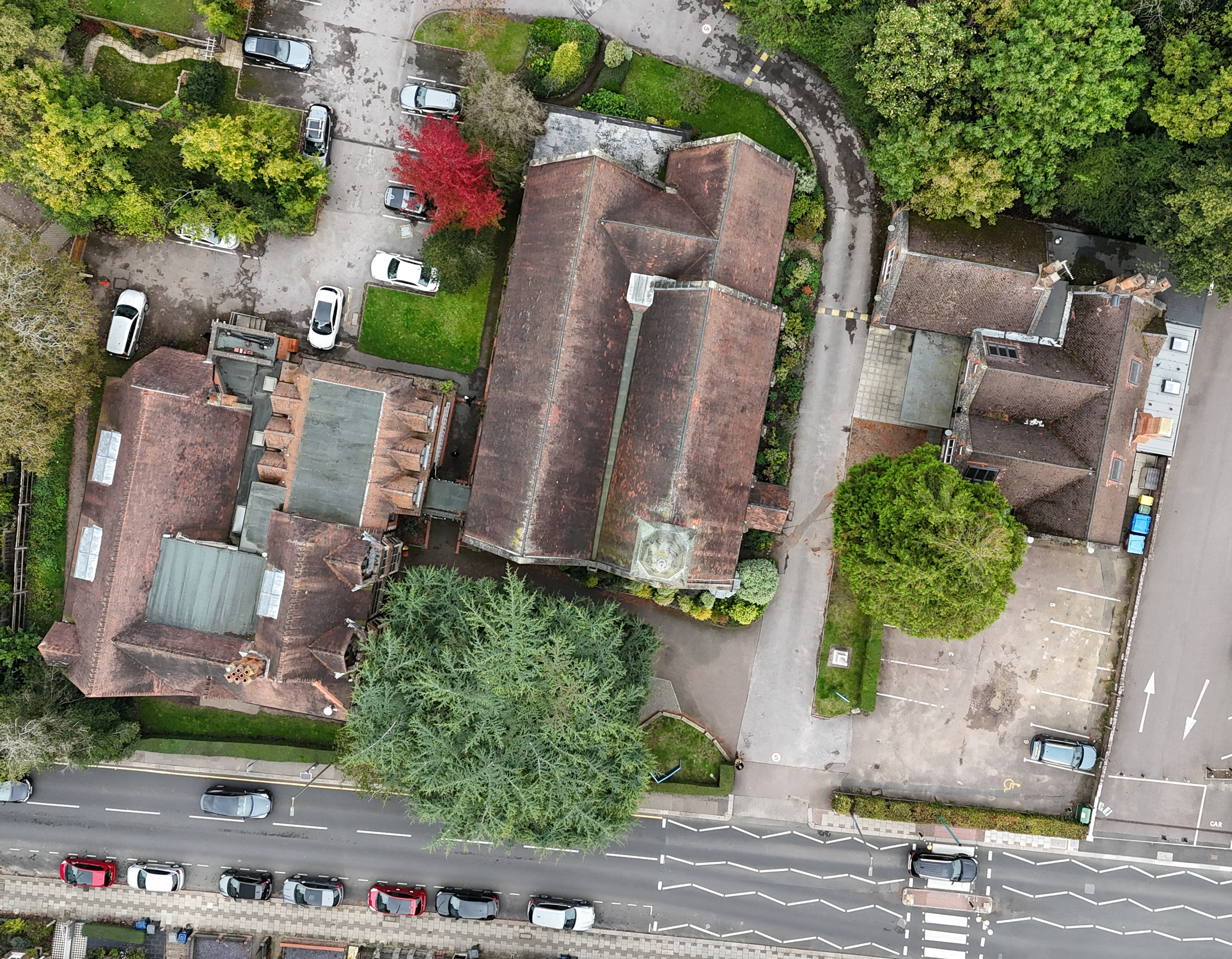
Aerial photo of Christ Church Barnet, Pennefather Memorial Hall, and Open Door Centre

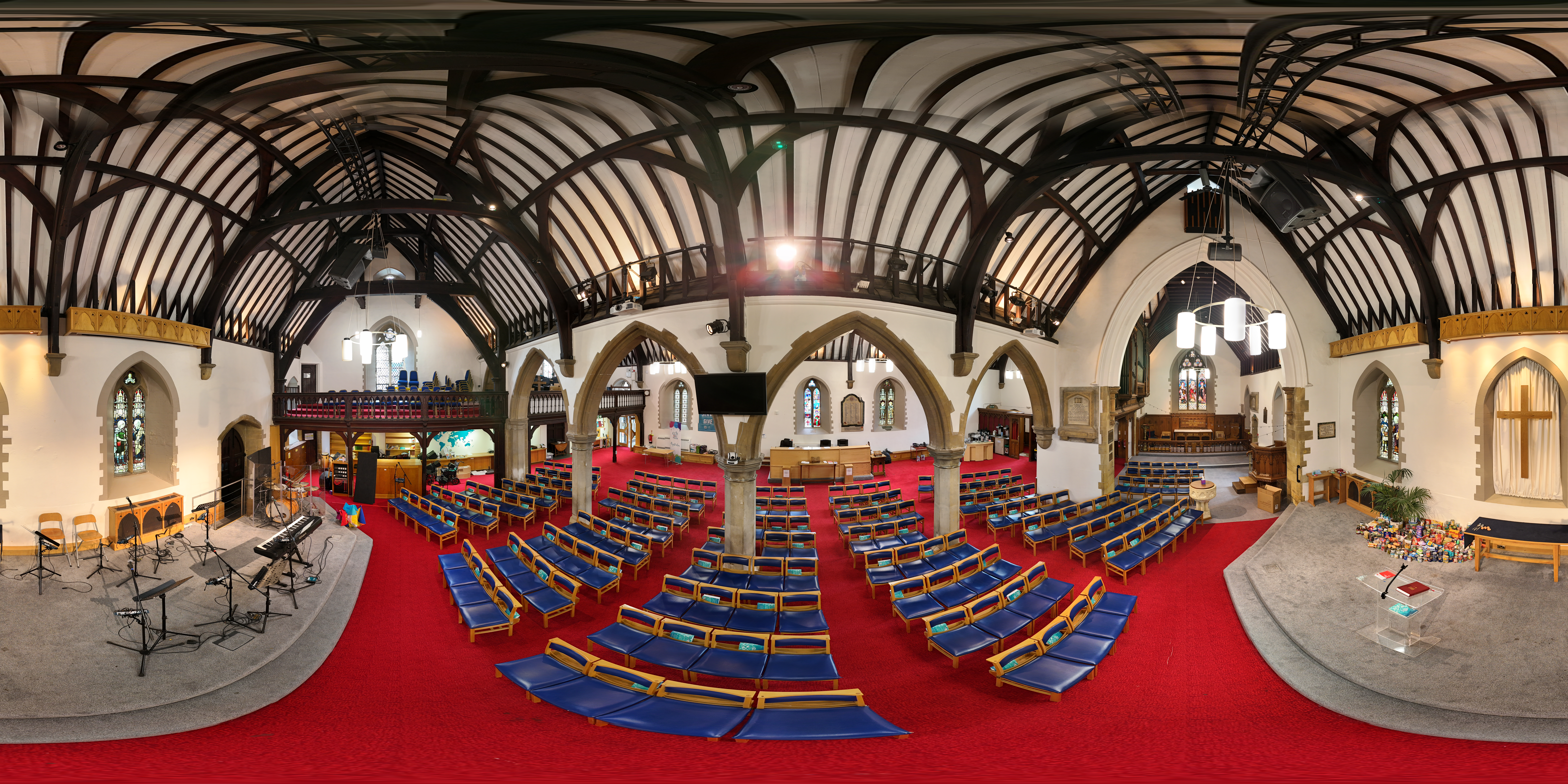
360 degree interior photo of Christ Church Barnet

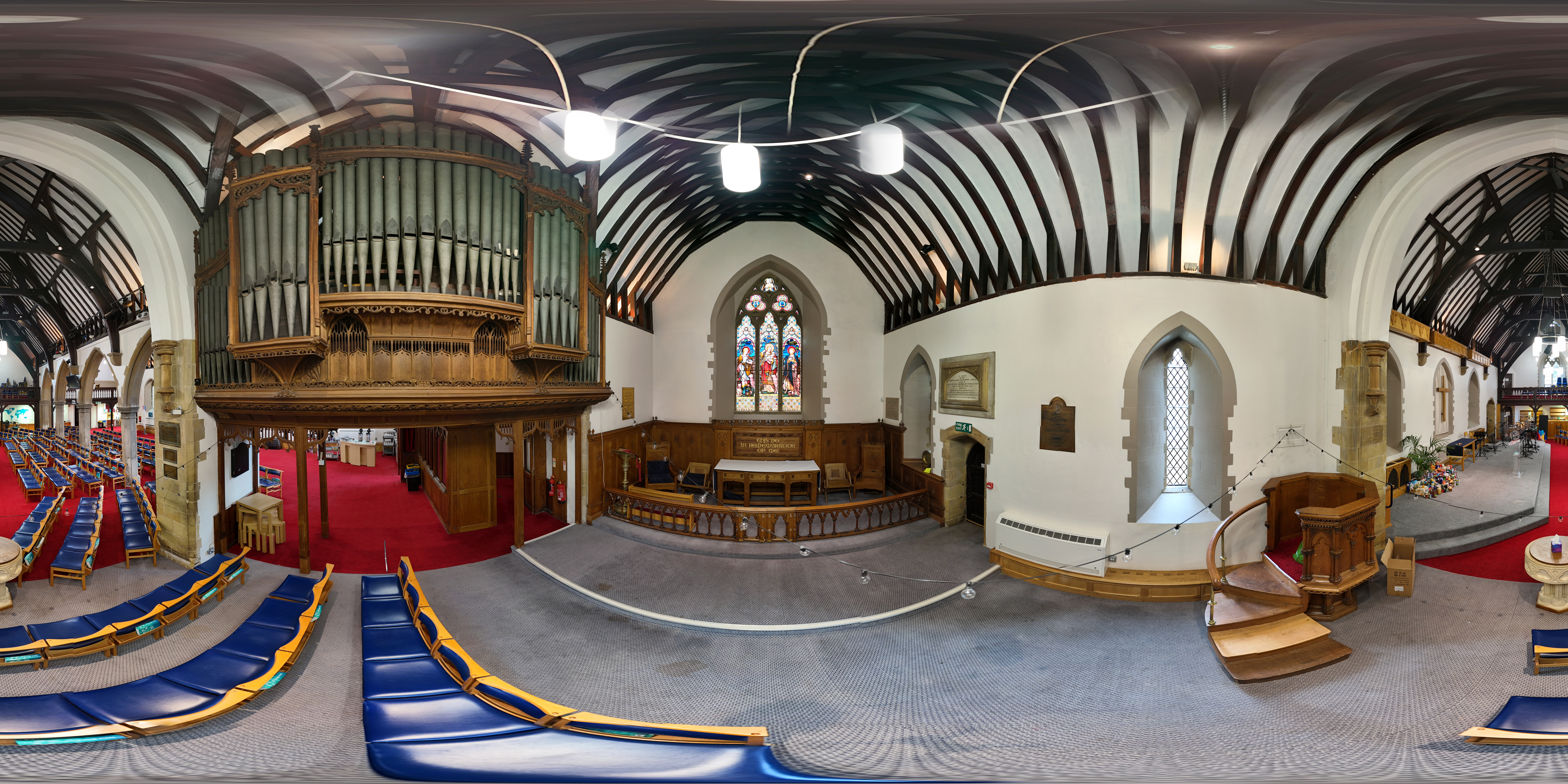
360 degree photo of the Chancel in Christ Church Barnet

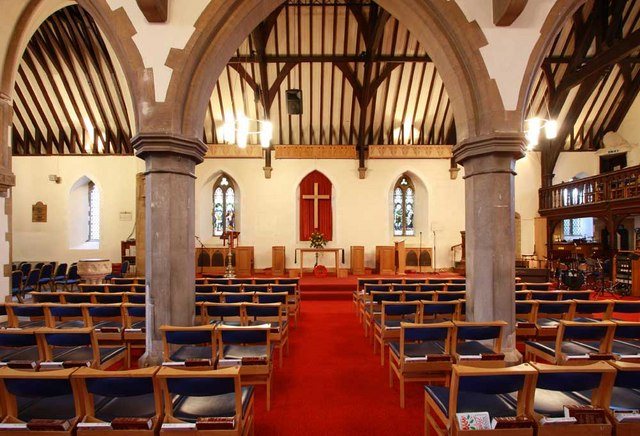
Interior, looking south

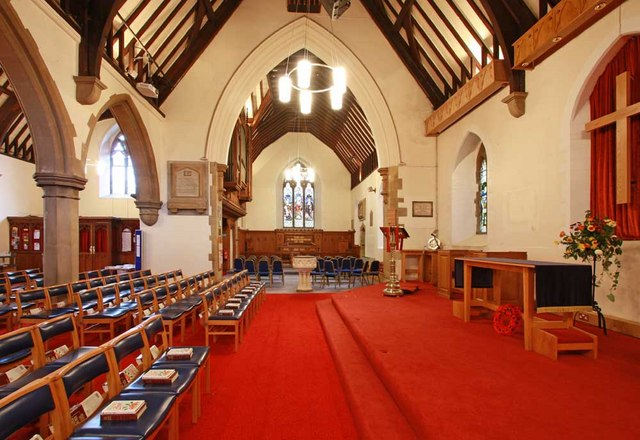
Interior, looking east

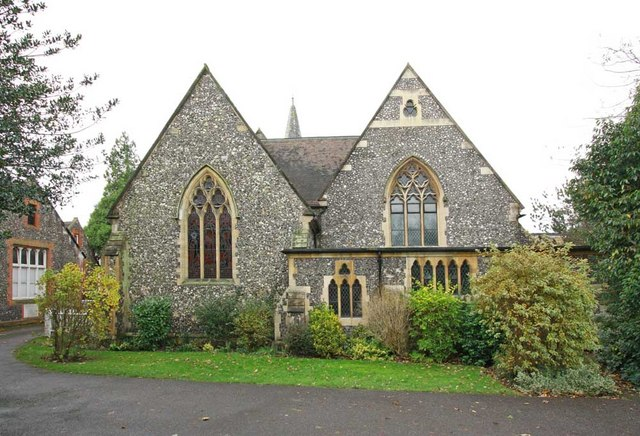
The back of the external church building

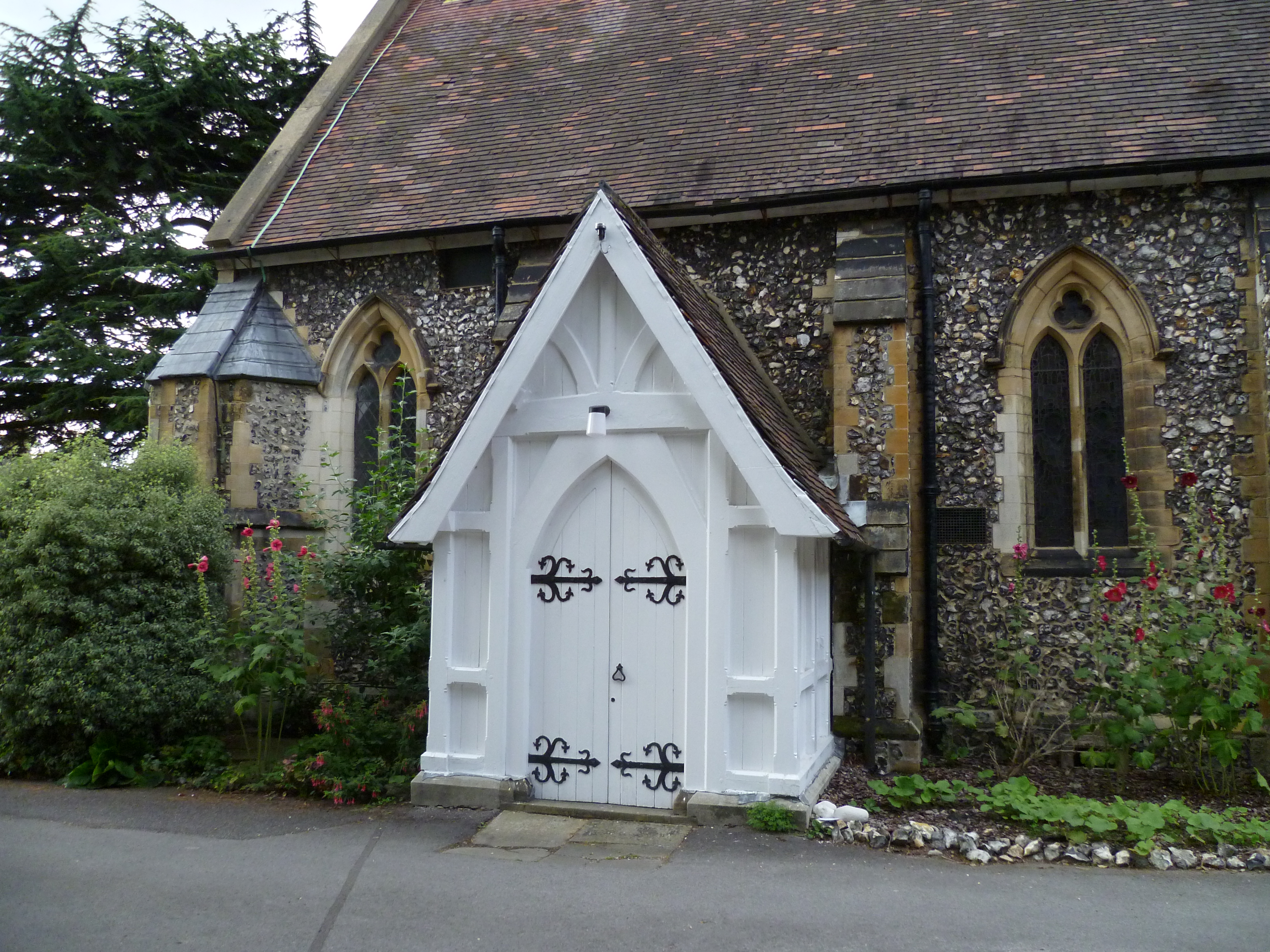
The side of the external church building

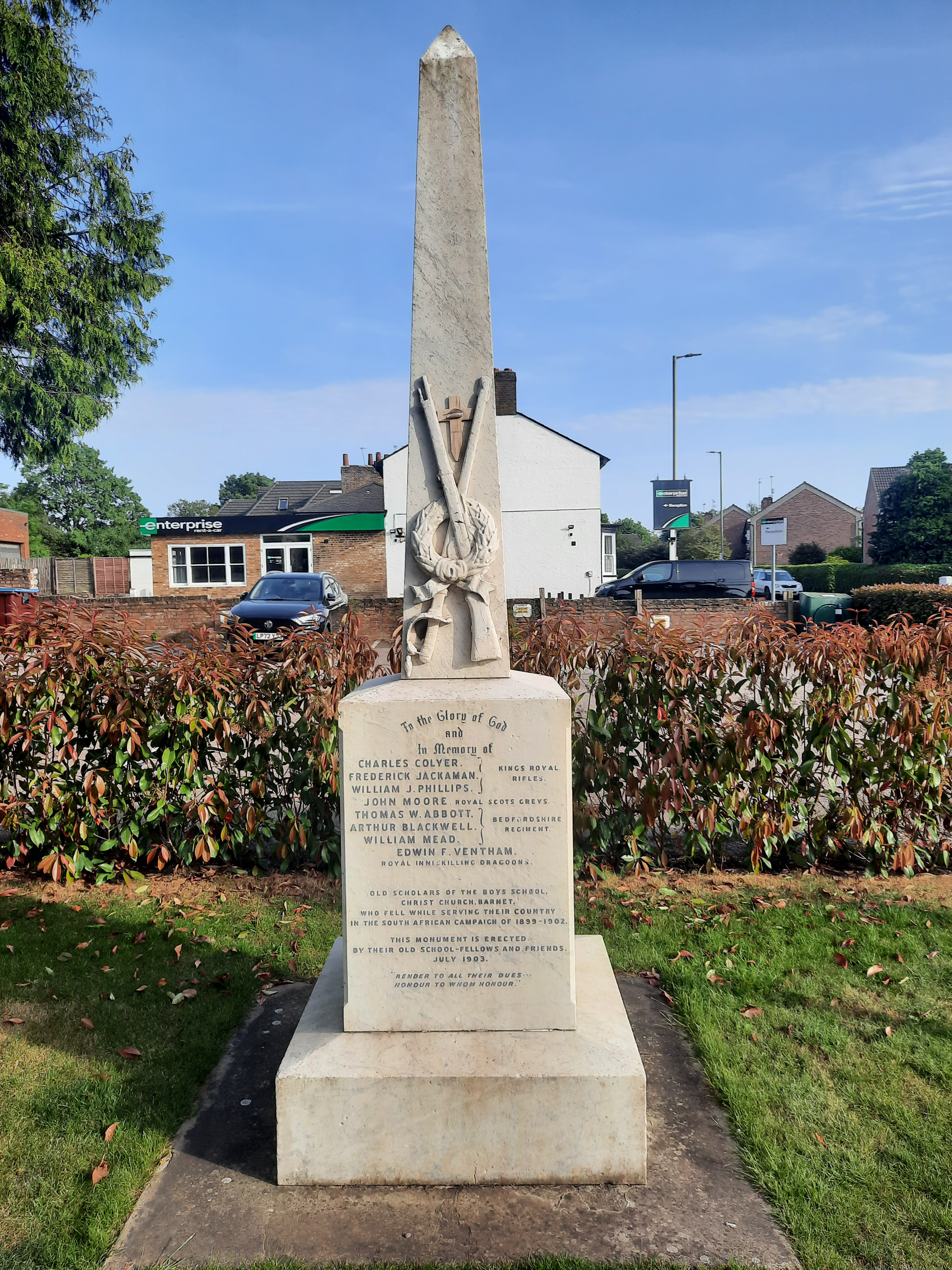
War memorial to the fallen of the Second Boer War
