= Barnet Boys School Boer War Memorial =

War memorial in Chipping Barnet, London

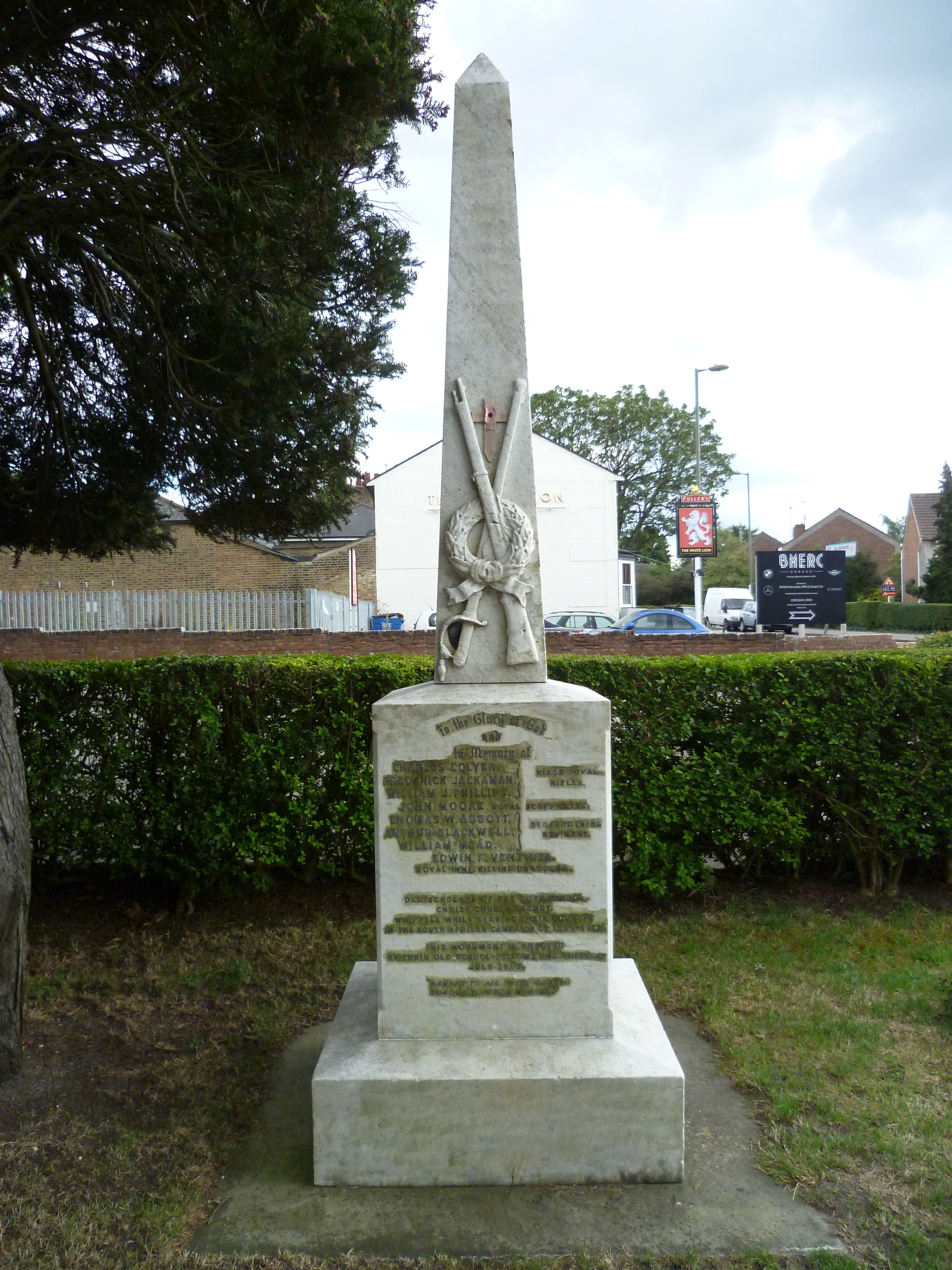
- Location: Chipping Barnet, London
- Coordinates: 51°39′30″N 0°12′16″W
- Type: War memorial

The Barnet Boys School Boer War Memorial is located opposite Christ Church on the St Albans Road in Chipping Barnet, London. It marks the deaths of the eight former pupils of Barnet Boys School who died in the Second Boer War of 1899 to 1902 and was unveiled by Field Marshal Lord Grenfell in July 1903. It has been grade II listed on the National Heritage List for England since June 2017. The heritage listing describes the monument as "simple yet dignified".

== Description ==
The memorial is in the form of a marble obelisk on a square marble pedestal base on a marble platform on a paving slab. It is decorated by a relief sculpture of a crossed rifle and sword on its front and back imposed over a laurel wreath. On the front face of the pedestal is inscribed.

"To the Glory of God / And / In Memory of / (names, with regiments) / OLD SCHOLARS OF THE BOYS SCHOOL / CHRIST CHURCH, BARNET. / WHO FELL WHILE SERVING THEIR COUNTRY / IN THE SOUTH AFRICAN CAMPAIGN OF 1899–1902 / THIS MONUMENT IS ERECTED / BY THEIR OLD SCHOOL-FELLOWS AND FRIENDS / JULY 1903. / "RENDER TO ALL THEIR DUES/ HONOUR TO WHOM HONOUR".
