= Friern Barnet Parishioners War Memorial =

War memorial in London

Coordinates: 51°37′16″N 0°09′50″W

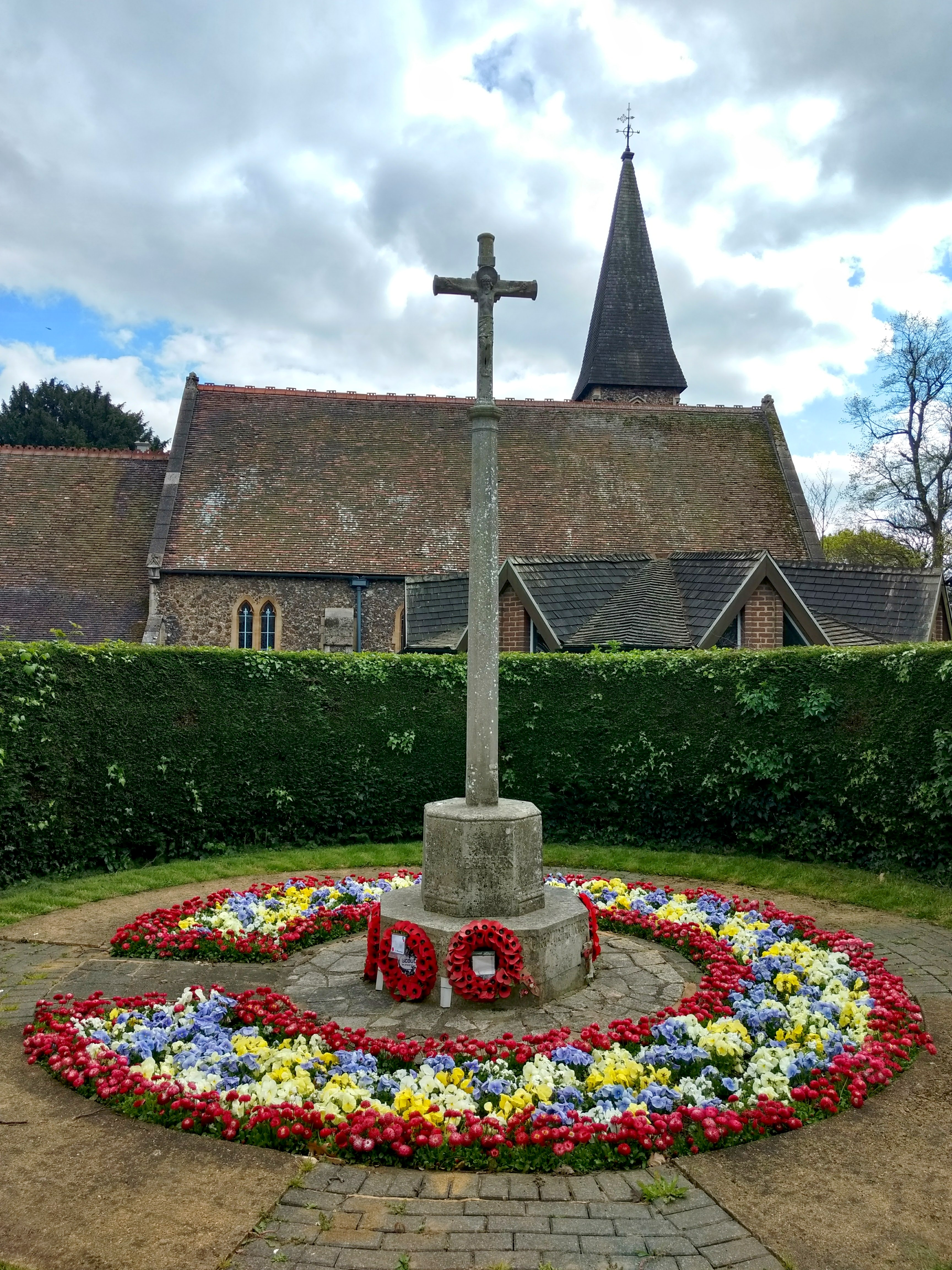
Friern Barnet Parishioners War Memorial

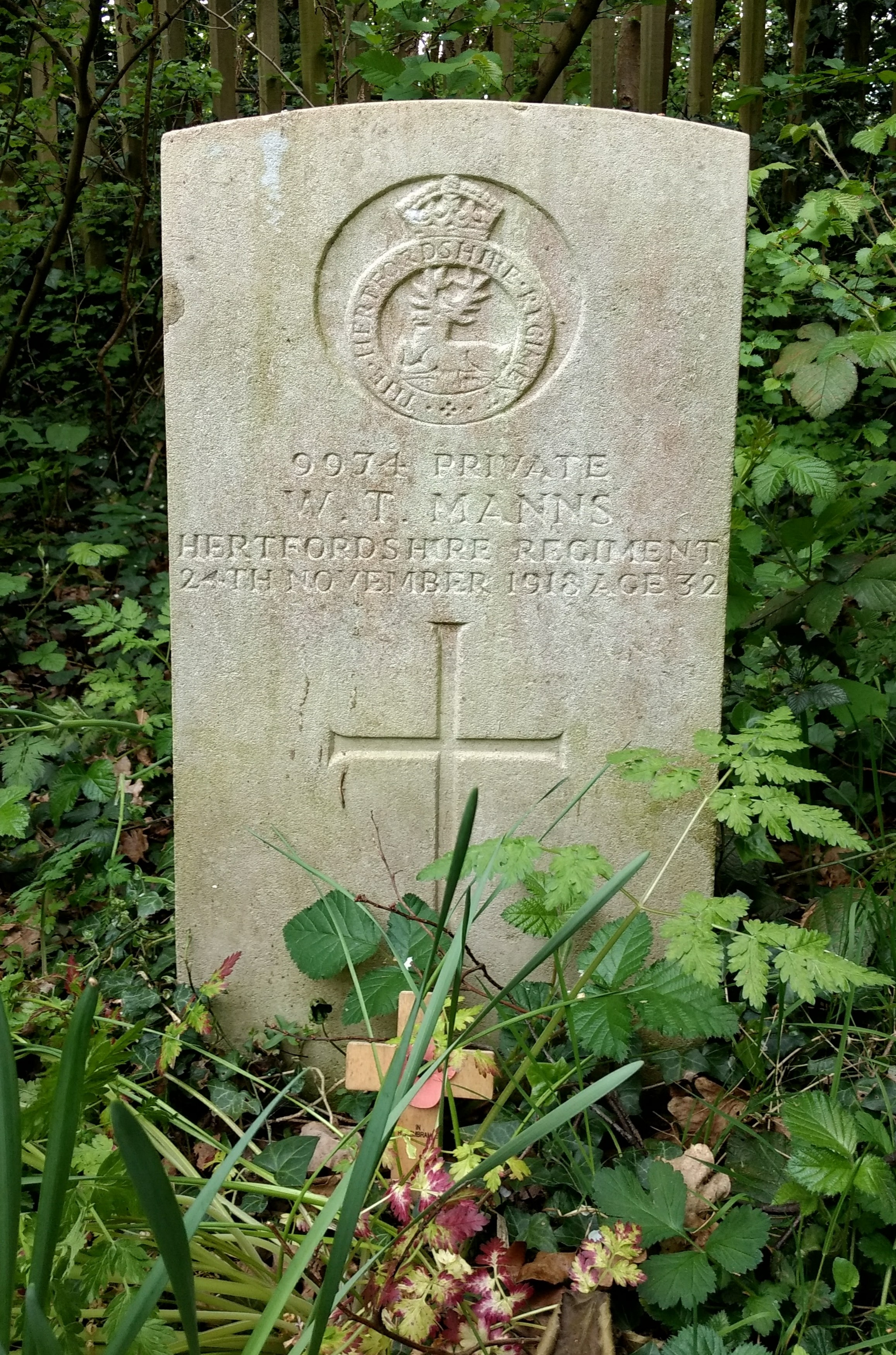
The grave of William Manns of the Hertfordshire Regiment at St James the Great. Manns was born in Friern Barnet and baptised at St James's in 1898. He died in 1918.

Friern Barnet Parishioners War Memorial is located in the churchyard of St James the Great, Friern Barnet Lane, London. It commemorates those of the parish who died on active service during the First World War.

== Names ==
The memorial commemorates eighty-five men and two women, soldiers, sailors, airmen or nurses, who died on active service during the First World War and who were living in the ecclesiastical parish of St James and St John, Friern Barnet, at the time of their enlistment in the services or who were regular worshippers at either of those churches. Eligibility for the memorial was not limited to church members. Two further individuals, Ivor Davies and James Cottamare, are memorialised inside the church. Second World War deaths are also memorialised inside the church and in the graveyard.

== The memorial ==
The memorial, by Martin Travers of Fulham, takes the form of a stone Latin cross and was dedicated in 1921 by the Reverend Edward Gage Hall, the rector of Friern Barnet. It bears the inscription:

1914–1919/ BROTHERS WHO DIED FOR OUR HOMES AND COUNTRY, WE SALUTE YOU, AND COMMEND YOU TO THE REDEEMER'S KEEPING/ [NAMES] / "WHOSE GLORY WAS REDRESSING HUMAN WRONG"
