= New Barnet War Memorial =

War memorial in London

Coordinates: 51°38′59″N 0°10′31″W

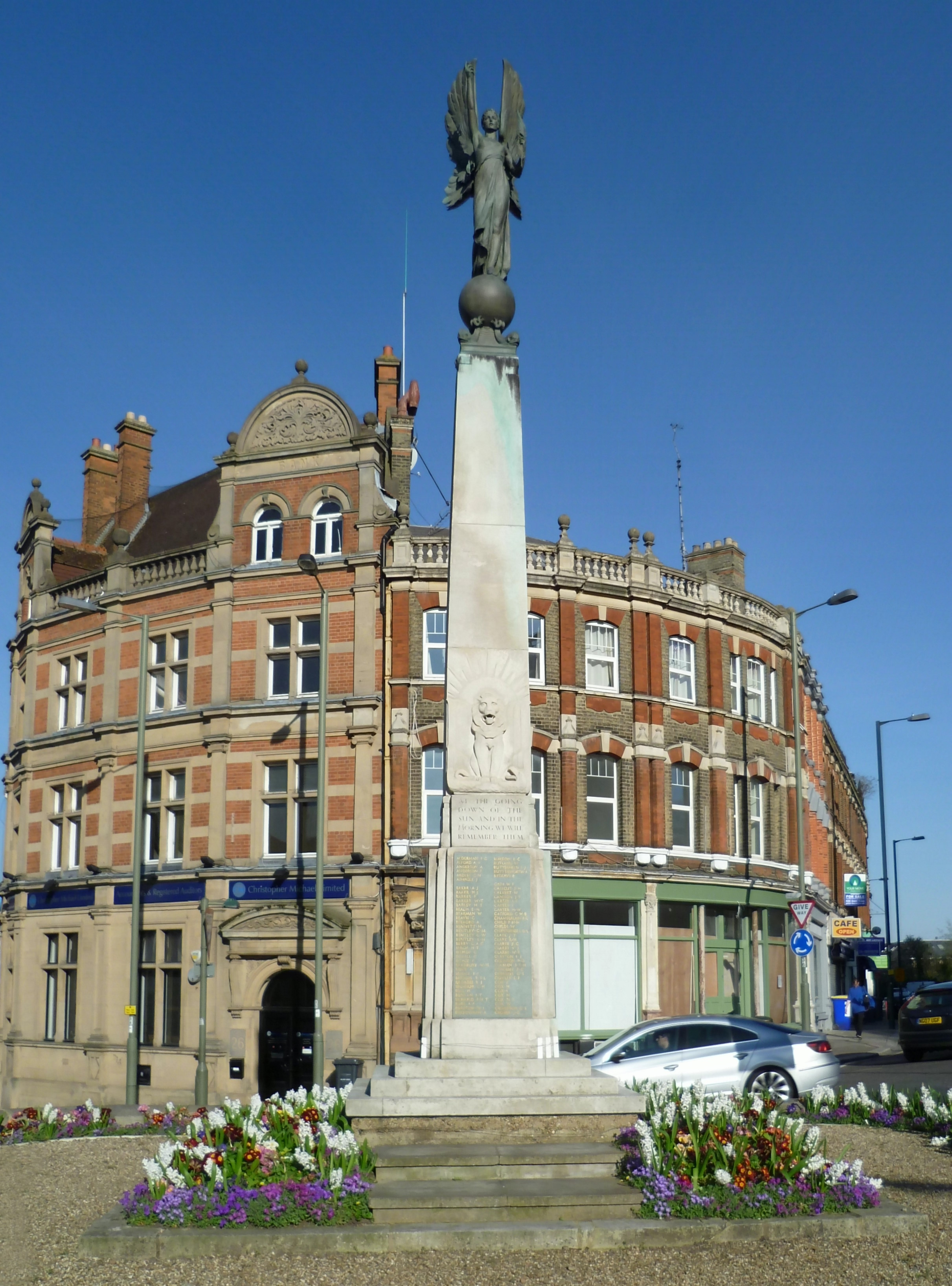
New Barnet War Memorial

The New Barnet War Memorial stands on a triangular plot at the junction of Station Road and Lyonsdown Road, New Barnet. It is grade II listed with Historic England.

The memorial was built in 1921 to commemorate the deaths in the First World War of the men of the former district of East Barnet Valley. It was designed by Newbury Abbot Trent ARA and unveiled by Viscount Hampden, commanding officer of the 1st Battalion the Hertfordshire Regiment during the war. It records the names of 277 men and one woman. The names of 136 men who died in the Second World War were subsequently added following a campaign by Catherine Loveday.

The memorial is surmounted by a bronze allegorical figure of "winged victory" holding a palm leaf on a globe atop an obelisk of Portland stone.
