= List of public art in the London Borough of Southwark =

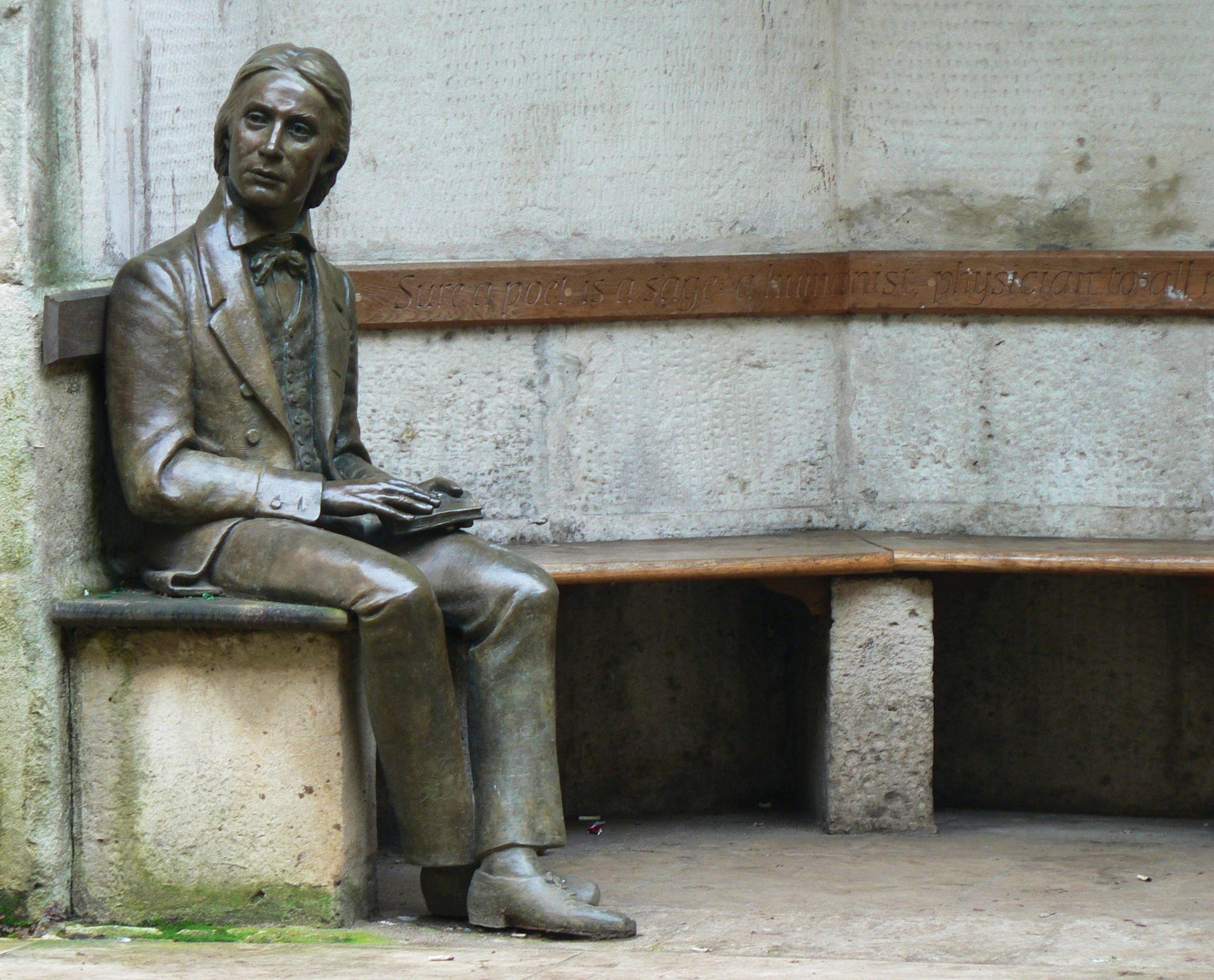
Stuart Williamson's statue of John Keats (2007), Guy's Hospital

This is a list of public art in the London Borough of Southwark.

== Bankside ==
Image	Title / subject	Location and coordinates	Date	Artist / designer	Architect / other	Type	Designation	Notes
	Poured Lines	Southwark Street	2006	Ian Davenport	—N/a	Painting	—N/a	The largest outdoor painting in Britain.
More images	Monument to the Unknown Artist	Sumner Street	2007	greyworld	—N/a	Animatronic statue	—N/a	
More images	A Family in Residence	Neo Bankside	2012	Ivan Murray	—N/a	Sculptural group	—N/a	
	65,000 Photographs	One Blackfriars	2019	Idris Khan	—N/a	Sculpture	—N/a	

== Bermondsey ==
Image	Title / subject	Location and coordinates	Date	Artist / designer	Architect / other	Type	Designation	Notes
	Memorial to James Braidwood	Tooley Street	1862	Samuel Henry Gardiner	—N/a	Relief		
More images	Statue of Samuel Bourne Bevington	Tooley Street 51.5029°N 0.0781°W	1910	Sydney March	—N/a	Statue	Grade II	
More images	St John Horsleydown War Memorial	St John's Churchyard 51.5022°N 0.0784°W	c. 1920	?	—N/a	Crucifix	Grade II	
More images	Bermondsey and Rotherhithe War Memorial	West Lane 51.4990°N 0.0605°W	1921	—N/a	?	Memorial column	Grade II	Unveiled October 1921.
More images	22nd Battalion London Regiment (The Queen's) War Memorial	Old Jamaica Road 51.4980°N 0.0709°W	1921	?	?	War memorial	Grade II	Unveiled 20 November 1921.
More images	Bust of Ernest Bevin	Tooley Street 51.5028°N 0.0779°W	1955	Ernest Shone-Jones after Edwin Whitney-Smith	—N/a	Bust	—N/a	
	Lady with a Greyhound	Avondale Square	1962	Antony Weller	—N/a	Sculpture		
More images	'Jacob' – The Circle Dray Horse	The Circle, Queen Elizabeth Street 51.50160°N 0.07438°W	1987	Shirley Pace		Statue	Grade II	Alludes to the brewery stables in the area in the 19th century and to the name of the historic parish Southwark St John Horsleydown, which may refer to a grazing ground.
More images	The Navigators	Hay's Galleria	1987	David Kemp				
More images	Torso	Brewery Square, Courage Yard	1991	Antony Donaldson	—N/a	Sculpture	—N/a	
More images	Waterfall	Courage Yard (formerly Horselydown Square and Tower Bridge Piazza) 51.5038°N 0.0754°W	1991	Antony Donaldson		Fountain with sculpture	—N/a	
More images	Exotic Cargo	St Saviour's Dock footbridge, Butler's Wharf	1995	Peter Randall-Page	—N/a	Sculpture	—N/a	
	A Last Parting Look (for C.D.) Charles Dickens	22 Leathermarket Street	2006	Joseph Kosuth		Installation	—N/a	The text is a quotation from Dickens's novel The Pickwick Papers.
More images	The Bermondsey Lion	The Blue 51.4924°N 0.0636°W	2011	Kevin Boys	—N/a	Sculpture	—N/a	
More images	Dr Salter's Daydream Alfred Salter	Cherry Gardens 51.5006°N 0.0597°W	2014	Diane Gorvin	—N/a	Sculptures	—N/a	Replaces a group of the same name installed here in 1991. The seated statue of Dr Salter was stolen in 2011, after which the figures of his daughter Joyce and her cat were taken into safekeeping by Southwark Council. The new work includes an additional sculpture portraying Salter's wife, Ada.
	Memorial to Albert Edward McKenzie	Tower Bridge Road	2015	Kevin Boys	Tim Wood	Sculpture	—N/a	
More images	Cornerstone	Tanner Street Park	2020	Austin Emery	—N/a	Sculpture	—N/a	
More images	Mandela Way T-34 Tank	Mandela Way 51.4930°N 0.0827°W					—N/a	

== Camberwell ==
Image	Title / subject	Location and coordinates	Date	Artist / designer	Architect / other	Type	Designation	Notes
More images	Statue of Robert Bentley Todd	King's College Hospital, Denmark Hill	1863	Matthew Noble				
	Camberwell Beauty butterfly	Denmark Hill (on wall of Superdrug)	20th century		—N/a	Tile mural	—N/a	
	Two mermaid corbels	Wells Way	1903	Henry Gunthorp and Sylvester Horsman	Maurice Bingham Adams and William Oxtoby	Corbels	Grade II	
	Camberwell Beauty butterfly	Wells Way	c. 1920	?	Maurice Bingham Adams	Tile mural	Grade II	The butterfly was used as the logo of the local stationery firm Samuel Jones & Co. The mural was relocated to its present site after the firm left its offices in Peckham in 1982.
More images	Burgess Park War Memorial	55 Wells Way (formerly St George's Church) 51.481784°N 0.085481°W	1920	Arild Rosenkrantz	—N/a	Statue	Grade II	Unveiled 19 September 1920.
More images	1st Surrey Rifles War Memorial	St Giles's churchyard, Camberwell Church Street 51.4733°N 0.0870°W	1921	?	—N/a	Memorial cross	Grade II	Unveiled 6 November 1921.
More images	Statue of William Booth	Outside William Booth Memorial Training College, Champion Park 51.4679°N 0.0886°W	1929	George Edward Wade	Giles Gilbert Scott	Statue	Grade II	
More images	Statue of Catherine Booth	Outside William Booth Memorial Training College, Champion Park 51.4679°N 0.0888°W	1929	George Edward Wade	Giles Gilbert Scott	Statue	Grade II	
	Memorial to Damilola Taylor	Oliver Goldsmith Primary School	2001–2002	Alexandra Brooke	—N/a	Sculpture	—N/a	
More images	Run	Denmark Hill	2009	Leigh Dyer	—N/a	Sculptures	—N/a	

== Dulwich ==
Image	Title / subject	Location and coordinates	Date	Artist / designer	Architect / other	Type	Designation	Notes
	St Peter's Church War Memorial	St Peter's churchyard, Lordship Lane 51.4431°N 0.0675°W	after 1918	?	—N/a	Rectangular pillar with flagpole	Grade II	
	St Stephen's Church War Memorial	St Stephen's churchyard, College Road 51.4323°N 0.0784°W	after 1918	?	—N/a	Celtic cross	Grade II	
More images	Dulwich College War Memorial	Dulwich College 51.4402°N 0.0842°W	1920; 1990	—N/a	W. H. Atkin-Berry; John Wells-Thorpe	Memorial cross with stelae	Grade II	Unveiled 17 June 1921 by Major General Sir Webb Gillman.
More images	Southwark Military Hospital War Memorial	Former Dulwich Hospital 51.4589°N 0.0807°W	1920; 2009	?	—N/a	Memorial cross	Grade II	Unveiled 16 October 1920, on a site about 20m to the west of its current location. Only the base is original, the cross and shaft having been lost after the memorial was put into storage in the 1950s. Restored and reinstalled on this site in 2009.
More images	Dulwich Old College War Memorial	Dulwich Old College 51.4468°N 0.0859°W	1921	—N/a	W. D. Caröe	Memorial cross	Grade II	
More images	Memorial to Edward Alleyn	Dulwich Old College 51.4469°N 0.0860°W	2005	Louise Simson	—N/a	Sculptural group	—N/a	
More images	Walking the Dog	Dulwich Picture Gallery	2009	Peter Randall-Page	—N/a	Sculpture	—N/a	Presented by the Art Fund in 2011 to mark the Dulwich Picture Gallery's bicentenary.
	Three Perpetual Chords	Dulwich Park	2015	Conrad Shawcross	—N/a	Sculpture	—N/a	

== Elephant and Castle ==
Image	Title / subject	Location and coordinates	Date	Artist / designer	Architect / other	Type	Designation	Notes
More images	Elephant and Castle	Elephant and Castle	1898	?	—N/a	Sculpture	—N/a	
	Borough of Southwark World War II Memorial	Walworth Town Hall, Walworth Road	1949	?	—N/a	Tablets	Grade II	Unveiled 11 June 1949.
More images	Michael Faraday Memorial	Elephant and Castle roundabout 51.4950°N 0.1006°W	1959–1961	—N/a	Rodney Gordon	Sculpture	Grade II	
	Southwark Memorial	Walworth Square	2018	Kenny Hunter	—N/a	Sculpture	—N/a	
	Big King	Morley College	?	Glenn Hellman	—N/a	Architectural sculpture	—N/a	

== Kennington ==
Image	Title / subject	Location and coordinates	Date	Artist / designer	Architect / other	Type	Designation	Notes
More images	Two Piece Reclining Figure No. 3	Brandon Estate, Cooks Road 51.4825°N 0.1043°W	1961	Henry Moore	—N/a	Sculpture	—N/a	
More images	Segment of the Berlin Wall	Geraldine Mary Harmsworth Park	?	"Indiano" (Jürgen L. Grosse)	—N/a	Segment of wall with graffiti	—N/a	
More images	Soviet War Memorial	Geraldine Mary Harmsworth Park 51.4962°N 0.1096°W	1999	Sergei Shcherbakov	Garry Breeze	Sculpture	—N/a	Unveiled 9 May (Victory Day) 1999.
	Peace Sculpture	Geraldine Mary Harmsworth Park 51.4964°N 0.1078°W	2015	mORGANICo	—N/a	Sculpture	—N/a	Carved from the trunk of a plane tree which had succumbed to disease.
	Memorial to Brian Haw	School of Historical Dress, Lambeth Road	2025	Amanda Ward		Sculpture		Unveiled 16 March 2025. The site lies just outside the one-mile radius from Parliament within which Haw was banned from protesting in 2005, and faces the Imperial War Museum.

== Newington ==
Image	Title / subject	Location and coordinates	Date	Artist / designer	Architect / other	Type	Designation	Notes
More images	Statue of Alfred the Great	Trinity Church Square 51.4989°N 0.0936°W	Late 1st – early 2nd century (lower half); early 19th century (upper half)	?	—N/a	Statue	Grade II	The lower half is a remnant of a colossal Roman statue, most likely of the goddess Minerva. Previously thought to be either a medieval statue commissioned by Richard II for Westminster Hall, or entirely 18th- or 19th-century.
	The Black Friar	Friars House, Blackfriars Road / Pocock Street	1958	Edward Bainbridge Copnall		Relief		

== Peckham ==
Image	Title / subject	Location and coordinates	Date	Artist / designer	Architect / other	Type	Designation	Notes
More images	History of the Old Kent Road	The Everlasting Arms Ministries (formerly the North Peckham Civic Centre), 600–608 Old Kent Road 51.4833°N 0.0655°E	1964	Adam Kossowski	—N/a	Ceramic mural	Grade II	
More images	Peckham Arch	Peckham Square	1994	Ron Haselden	John McAslan	Canopy with light art	—N/a	
	Arrows and Obelisks	Tesco, Old Kent Road 51.4883°N 0.0762°W	1995	Peter Logan	—N/a	Kinetic sculpture	—N/a	

== Rotherhithe ==
Image	Title / subject	Location and coordinates	Date	Artist / designer	Architect / other	Type	Designation	Notes
	Bluecoat Boy and Girl statues	Façade of 70 St Marychurch Street, near St Mary's Church 51.50097°N 0.05407°W	after 1700	?	—N/a	Statues	Grade II	
	Two caryatides	Southwark Park	1897	Henry Poole	Murray and Foster (original building)	Caryatides (now freestanding)	—N/a	Originally flanked the entrance of Rotherhithe Town Hall, which was demolished after being heavily damaged in the Blitz. Relocated to the Heygate Estate in 1974, then to this site in 2011.
More images	Holy Trinity Church War Memorial	Holy Trinity churchyard 51.5003°N 0.0348°W	after 1918	?	—N/a	Cross atop a fluted pillar	Grade II	
More images	St Mary's Church War Memorial	St Mary's churchyard 51.5012°N 0.0542°W	after 1918	?	—N/a	Memorial cross	Grade II	
More images	Norwegian Seamen's War Memorial	St Olav's Church 51.4990°N 0.0604°W	1927	?	—N/a	War memorial	Grade II	
More images	Curlicue	Greenland Dock 51.4961°N 0.0327°W	1989	William Pye	—N/a	Sculpture	—N/a	
	Bust of James Walker	Greenland Dock 51.49542°N 0.04074°W	1990	Michael Rizzello	—N/a	Bust	—N/a	
	Deal Porters	Canada Water	1990	Philip Bews	—N/a	Sculptural group	—N/a	Unveiled 19 October 1990 by Jack Jones.
More images	Sunshine Weekly and the Pilgrim's Pocket	Cumberland Wharf 51.5024°N 0.0519°W	1991	Peter McLean	—N/a	Sculptural group	—N/a	
	Memorial to Christopher Jones	St Mary's churchyard	1995	Jamie Sargeant	—N/a	Sculptural group	—N/a	
	Sustrans Portrait Bench	Greenland Dock 51.49530°N 0.04047°W	2013	?	—N/a	Sculpture	—N/a	Depicts Phyllis Pearsall, Michael Caine, and Barry Mason (represented by a bicycle and cormorant).

== Southwark ==
Image	Title / subject	Location and coordinates	Date	Artist / designer	Architect / other	Type	Designation	Notes
	Royal arms of George III	Façade of King's Arms pub, Newcomen Street	c. 1728	—N/a	—N/a	Architectural sculpture (relief)	Grade II	Originally stood on a gateway that spanned the old London Bridge. Placed on the pub's façade soon after it was completed in 1890.
More images	Statue of Thomas Guy	Guy's Hospital 51.5043°N 0.0879°W	1734	Peter Scheemakers	—N/a	Statue	Grade II	
	The Sower	Red Cross Garden 51.5033°N 0.0948°W	1896	After Louisa Beresford, Marchioness of Waterford	James Powell and Sons (glassmakers)	Mosaic	Grade II	
	Plaque marking the approximate site of the Globe Theatre	Park Street	1909	Édouard Lantéri	—N/a	Plaque with relief	—N/a	Unveiled by Herbert Beerbohm Tree and commissioned by the Shakespeare Reading Society, of which Tree was President.
More images	Guy's Hospital War Memorial	Guy's Hospital, St Thomas Street 51.5030°N 0.0890°W	1921	—N/a	William Walford	Memorial arch	Grade II	Unveiled 16 July 1921 by the Duke of York (the future George V).
More images	London, Brighton and South Coast Railway War Memorial	London Bridge station 51.5046°N 0.086°E	1921	?	—N/a	Plaques	—N/a	Unveiled 5 October 1921.
	London Hop Trade War Memorial	Borough High Street 51.5043°N 0.0908°W	1922	Omar Ramsden	—N/a	Plaque	—N/a	Unveiled 19 January 1922.
More images	St Saviour's War Memorial	Borough High Street, opposite Talbot's Yard 51.5043°N 0.0909°W	1922	Philip Lindsey Clark	—N/a	Statue	Grade II*	Unveiled 16 November 1922.
	Statue of William Morris, 1st Viscount Nuffield	Guy's Hospital 51.4866°N 0.0695°W	1949	Maurice Lambert	—N/a	Statue	—N/a	
More images	Minerva	Southwark Cathedral	1966	Alan Collins	—N/a	Statue	—N/a	
More images	The Holy Family	Cathedral Street	1981	Kenneth Hughes	—N/a	Sculptural group	—N/a	
	Opus	Nancy Sear Building (Morley College), King Edward Walk	1982–1983	Wendy Taylor	—N/a	Sculpture	—N/a	
More images	Southwark Gateway Needle	London Bridge, at south end 51.5062°N 0.0881°W	1999	—N/a	Eric Parry	Sculpture	—N/a	
More images	Couple	More London Place	2003	Stephan Balkenhol	—N/a	Statues	—N/a	
More images	Full Stop	More London	2003	Fiona Banner	—N/a	Sculptures	—N/a	
More images	Evergreen	The Queen's Walk (More London)	2003	David Batchelor	—N/a	Sculpture	—N/a	
More images	Memorial to Mahomet Weyonomon	Churchyard of Southwark Cathedral	2006	Peter Randall-Page	—N/a	Sculpture	—N/a	Unveiled 22 November 2006 by Elizabeth II.
More images	Blue Men	Maya House, Borough High Street	2007	Ofra Zimbalista		Architectural sculpture	—N/a	
More images	Statue of John Keats	Guy's Hospital	2007	Stuart Williamson	—N/a	Statue	—N/a	
	Boat	Cancer Centre, Guy's Hospital	c. 2016	Daniel Silver	—N/a	Sculpture	—N/a	Inspired by the discovery of an ancient Roman barge on the site in 1958.
	Statue of Simon Milton	Outside One Tower Bridge	2016	Philip Jackson	—N/a	Statue	—N/a	
	Corten Head	Africa Centre, 66 Great Suffolk Street	2017	Sokari Douglas Camp	—N/a	Sculpture	—N/a	
More images	Me. Here. Now.	Stainer Street, London Bridge station 51.5052°N 0.0849°W	2018	Mark Titchner	—N/a	Sculpture	—N/a	
	Blue Moon	Vinegar Yard, corner of St Thomas Street and Fenning Street 51.5029°N 0.0841°W	2019	Joe Rush and the Mutoid Waste Company	—N/a	Sculpture	—N/a	A train carriage with ants formed from repurposed scrap metal crawling over it.
More images	WE	Shard Quarter / London Bridge station 51.5050°N 0.0869°W	2021	Jaume Plensa	—N/a	Sculpture	—N/a	A sculpture in two facing parts, one in the piazza of The Shard and another outside London Bridge station.
More images	In a River a Thousand Streams	London Bridge station 51.5051°N 0.0863°W	2024	Adam Nathaniel Furman	—N/a	Mosaic	—N/a	57 metres (187 ft) long mosaic beside the bus station at London Bridge.
	Mural	Nuffield Suite, Guy's Hospital 51.5028°N 0.0892°W	2024	Michele Curtis	—N/a	Mural	—N/a	Mural celebrating six African women who have contributed to UK healthcare: Metian Parsanka, Kofoworola Abeni Pratt, Matilda J. Clerk, Dzagbele Matilda Asante, Blanche La Guma, and Irene Ighodaro.
More images	Dog and Pot	Blackfriars Road, opposite Southwark tube station 51.5036°N 0.1043°W	2026	?	—N/a	Sculpture	—N/a	Replica of a sculpture originally outside an ironmonger's, as recalled by Charles Dickens. Two replicas were made, the first one installed in 2013. This was damaged over time and the other, gilded copy replaced it in 2026.

== See also ==
- National Covid Memorial Wall

== Bibliography ==
- Matthews, Peter (2018). London's Statues and Monuments. Oxford: Shire Publications.
