= Statue of John Keats, Guy's Hospital =

Sculpture by Stuart Williamson

Statue of John Keats
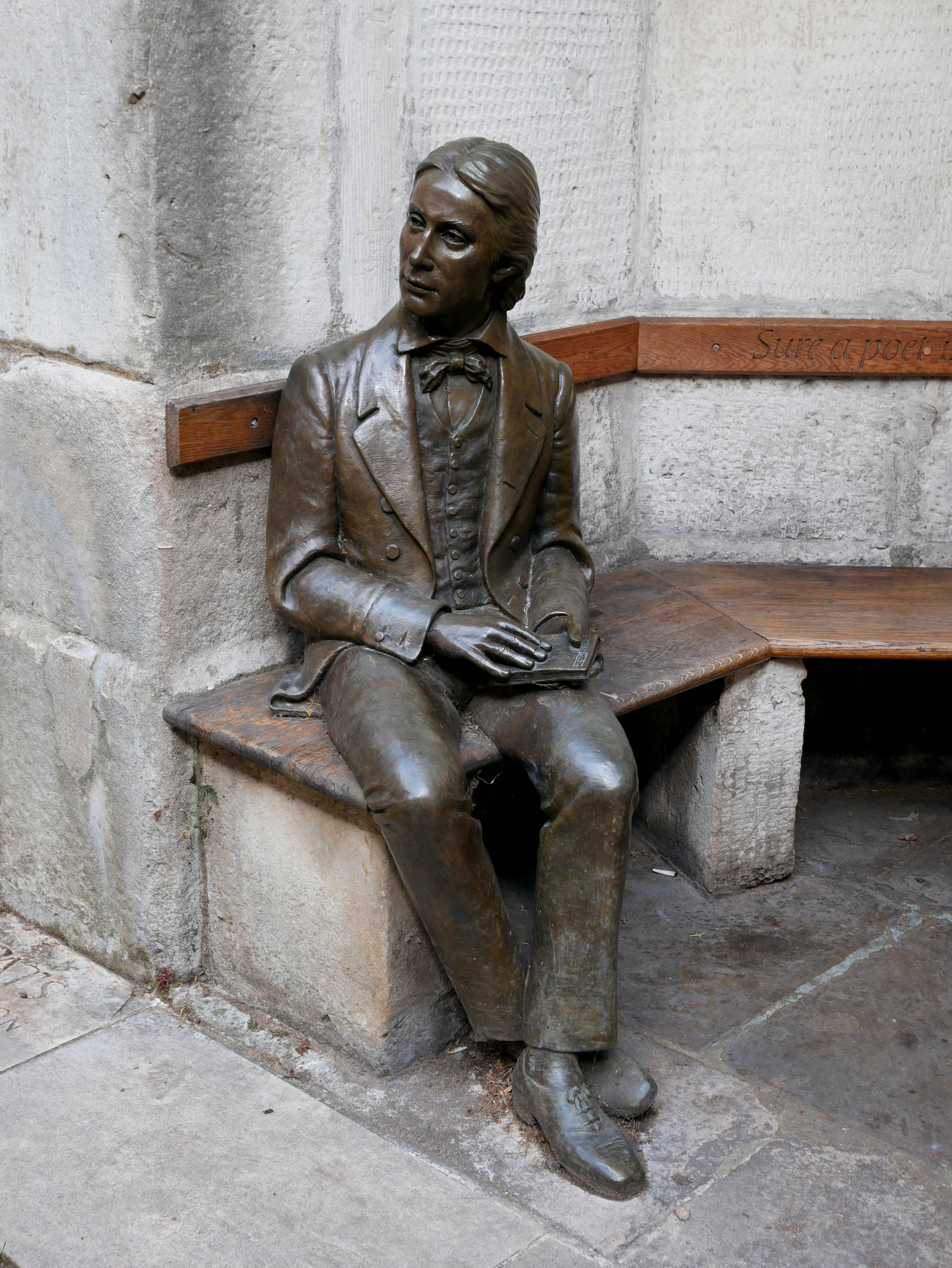
- Artist: Stuart Williamson
- Year: 2007
- Completion date: 2007
- Medium: Sculpture
- Subject: John Keats
- Location: Guy's Hospital, Southwark, United Kingdom

A statue of poet John Keats is situated in an alcove in the grounds of Guy's Hospital in the Southwark district of London. It was sculpted by Stuart Williamson and unveiled in 2007. Keats was a trainee doctor at the hospital.

== See also ==
- 2007 in art
