= Barry Mason (cyclist) =

British activist

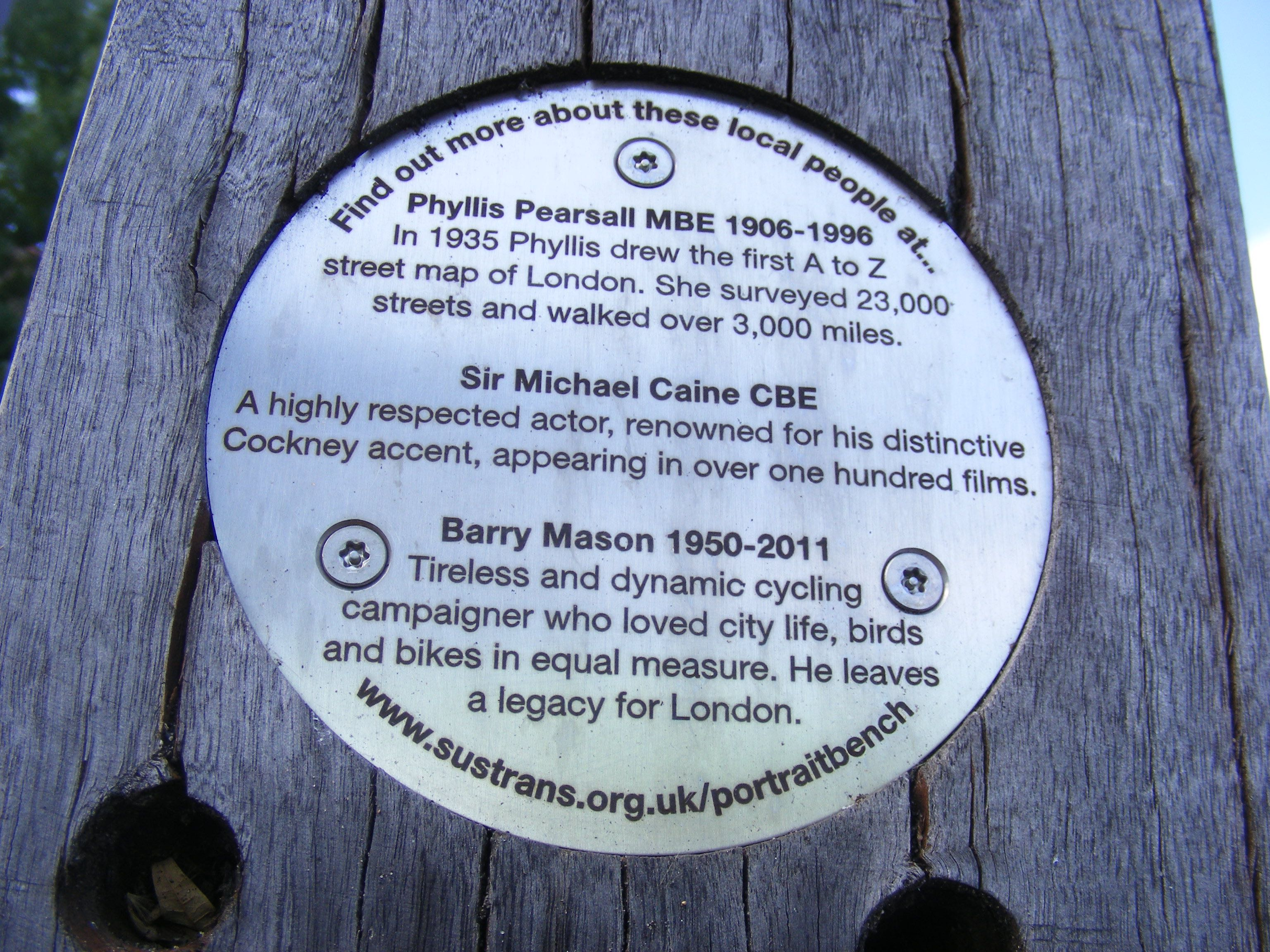
- Plaque commemorating Barry Mason at the Sustrans portrait bench, Greenland Dock
- Born: 5 January 1950
- Died: 2 June 2011 (aged 61)
- Occupation: Activist

Barry Mason (5 January 1950 – 2 June 2011) was an activist for cycling in London. After graduating from the London School of Economics, his career included two years as head of visitor services at Salisbury Cathedral and four years working in Liverpool. In his later years he supported community and environmental projects in Southwark, South London. For a time he managed school building projects for Southwark Council, then became manager of Surrey Docks Farm.

For many years he was the voluntary coordinator of Southwark Cyclists, whose secretary described him as "visionary and energetic over very many years in campaigning to improve safety and security for cyclists". Mason helped to make it one of the most active of the London Cycling Campaign's borough groups, as well as reviving the neighbouring Greenwich Cyclists. He ran maintenance classes and organized rides, including mass rides on Christmas Day, and organised return transport from the Dunwich Dynamo, an annual midsummer ride from London to Suffolk. He was cited by the press on cycling-related subjects such as safety and parking, and won the London Cycling Personality of the Year award in 2006.

Mason died while swimming off the coast near Rodiles in northern Spain during a cycling holiday in June 2011 with his partner Cheryl. He had a son and daughter from his marriage.
