= Dunwich Dynamo =

Annual semi-organised bicycle ride

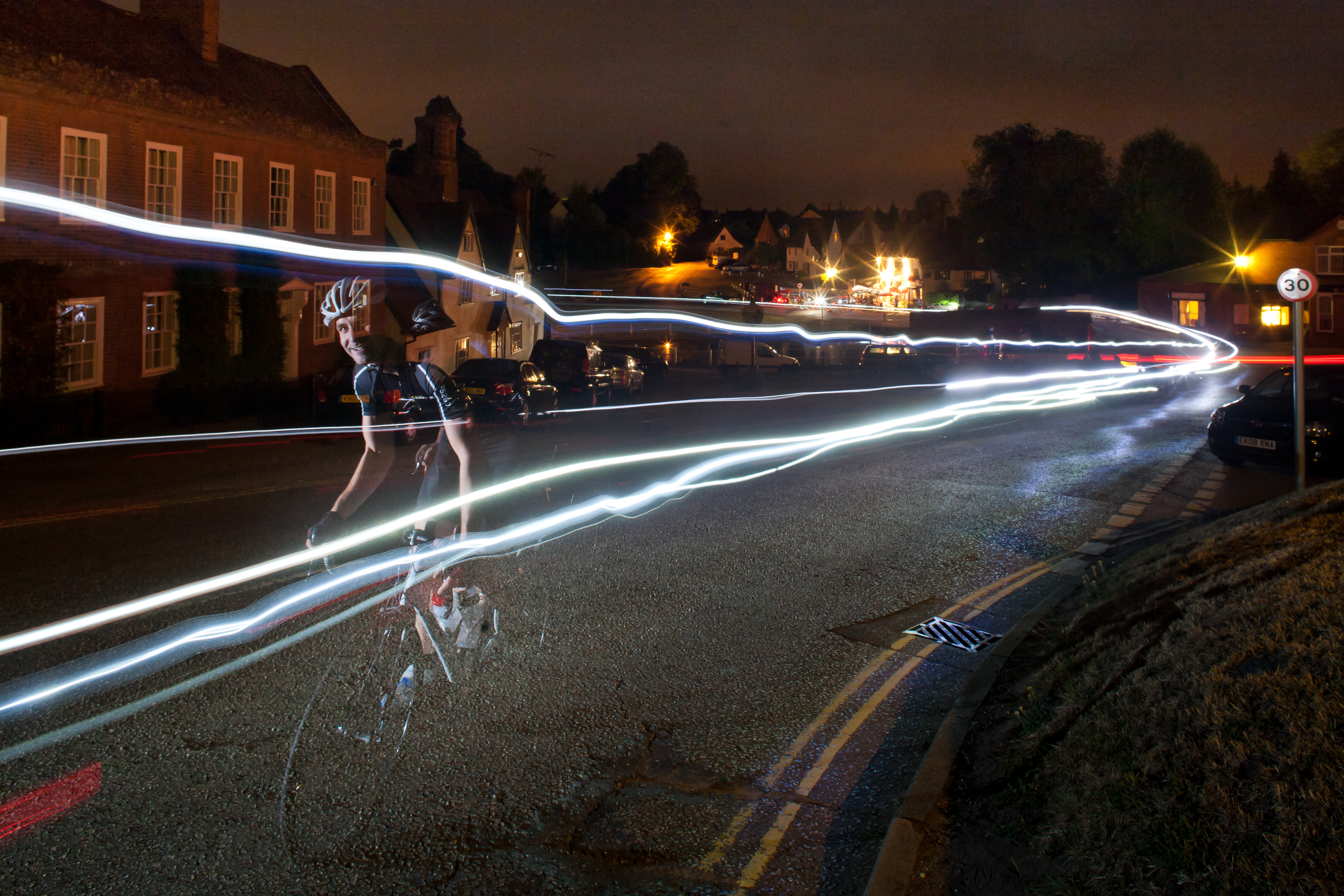
A long-exposure, light-trail image of cyclists passing through Finchingfield during the Dunwich Dynamo 2010

The Dunwich Dynamo (sometimes abbreviated to "Dun Run" or "DD") is an annual semi-organised, through-the-night bicycle ride from London Fields park in Hackney, London, England to Dunwich on the Suffolk coast. The distance is approximately 180km (112 miles).

The ride takes place overnight, hence "Dynamo". It is usually scheduled to take place on the Saturday night closest to the full moon in July, partly for tradition but also because it is easier to ride by moonlight. The date for DD20 was moved to 30 June/1 July 2012 to avoid clashing with the Olympics. The 2020 edition was cancelled due to the COVID-19 pandemic.

== History ==
The event was started in 1992 when Patrick Field, of the London School of Cycling, converted an informal ride into an organised event. It was sponsored by Mosquito Bikes of Essex Road, Islington, with some mechanical support and "controls" where riders had to check in to stamp an Audax-style “Brevet card”. During this period the ride started from the Eastway cycle circuit rather than London Fields as at present. After about 4 years the ride, which had become very popular, continued on an unsupported "turn up and go" basis. The controls and support ended, and the organisation of transport back from Dunwich at the end of the ride was arranged by Southwark Cyclists. For many years this was managed by Barry Mason.

The number of participants has increased every year, to an estimated 1,000 riders in 2009 and 1,500 in 2011. By 2015 more than 2,000 participants started the ride.

Due to the increasing numbers of participants the once adequate feeding arrangements have become overwhelmed and several "pop up" food stands have been introduced with the blessing of the organisers, to help meet demand. The main feeding stop was moved from the small village hall at Great Waldingfield (approximately 66 miles (106 km) out) to Sible Hedingham (about 50 miles (80 km) out) in 2010. Due to noise and littering issues Sible Hedingham was withdrawn as a feeding stop, and from 2016 onwards the main feeding stop is at the Fire Station in Sudbury (60 miles (97 km) out) with the profits going towards the Firefighters Charity. The Sudbury Fire Station was closed for the 2026 edition.

=== Unusual vehicles ===
In 2009, the ride was completed on a penny-farthing. In 2011, a rider completed the event on a "Boris bike" hired in central London. A team raising money for Re-cycle, Bicycles for Africa, completed the 2016 ride on a homemade four-person, four-wheeled chopper bike.

=== Incidents ===
The 2006 ride had 700 participants but was marred by the death of a 38-year-old participant, Andrew Rawling, in a head-on collision with a Ford Transit van in North Weald Bassett. The organisers suggested that the 2007 ride could take the form of a memorial event, but Rawling's family requested that it continue as normal without any dedication, as they did not wish the ride he had enjoyed to become a campaign or protest.

In 2018, 39-year old Dominic Turner collapsed and died. Turner was a keen cyclist and that helped him to help combat the encroaching effects of muscle-wasting disease Myotonic Dystrophy, but after collapsing outside Great Dunmow fellow cyclists and the emergency services, who performed first aid and CPR at the roadside, were unable to revive him.

== Route ==
The ride starts at London Fields and passes through Walthamstow, Epping, Moreton, Great Dunmow, Finchingfield, Sudbury, the Waldingfields, Needham Market, Cretingham, Framlingham, Peasenhall and Westleton, ending at Dunwich Beach.

== Other rides ==
Following the popularity of the Dunwich Dynamo, similar rides have been organised elsewhere in the UK:

- Darkmoor, a circuit from Plymouth over Dartmoor
- Exmouth Exodus which runs from Clifton Suspension Bridge in Bristol (until 2013) and later Bath (from 2014) to Exmouth seafront.
- Manchester to Blackpool Night Ride, a fundraiser for British Heart Foundation
- Ride to the Sun, from Carlisle to Cramond near Edinburgh
- Solstice Sunride, from Cambridge to Lowestoft.
- Scarborough Scramble, from Doncaster to Scarborough.

Outside of the UK:

- The Cape May Dyno, which runs from Philadelphia, PA to Cape May, NJ on the last Friday in September, was inspired by the Dunwich Dynamo

== See also ==
- Challenge riding
- Brevet or Randonnée
