= Hop Exchange =

Building in Bankside, London

Coordinates: 51°30′17.50″N 0°5′28.50″W

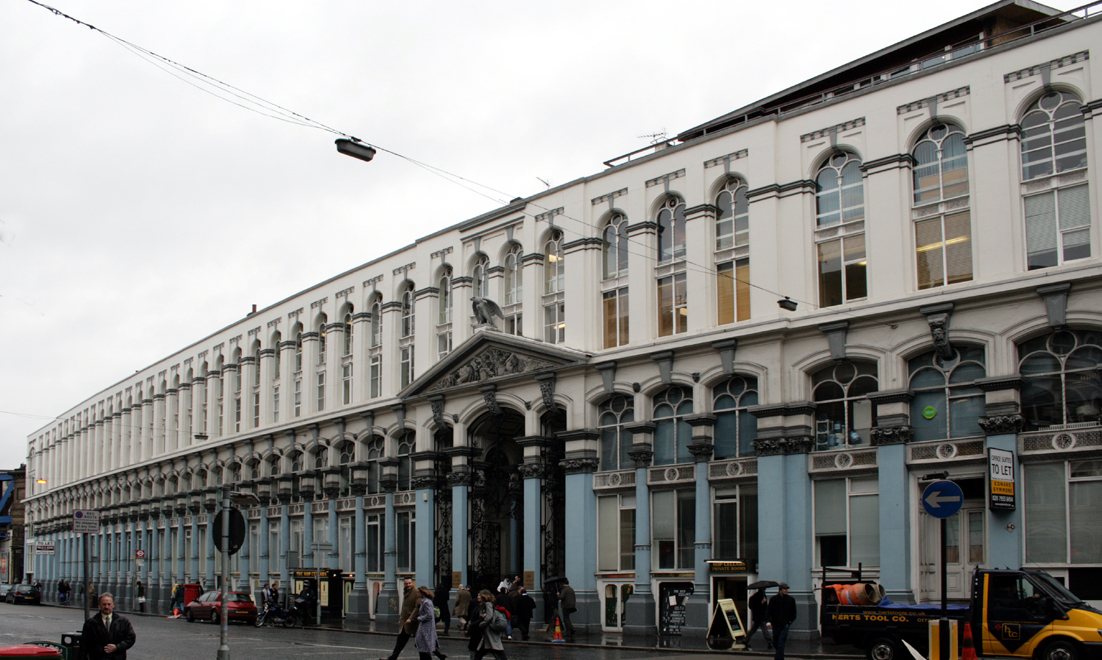
South Façade

The Hop Exchange is a Grade II listed building at No. 24 Southwark Street, London, in the Bankside area of the London Borough of Southwark. Opened in 1867 and designed by R.H. Moore it served as the centre for hop trading for the brewing industry.

== Overview ==
Hops, introduced to England from the Netherlands, are still used in the brewing industry. They are harvested from farms (known as "hop gardens") in Kent, and in the 19th century they were brought by railway to London Bridge Station, or by boat up the River Thames. They were then stored in the many warehouses in the Borough area.

The purpose of the Hop Exchange was to provide a single market centre for dealers in hops. A glass roof allowed business on the trading floor of the Great Hall to be conducted under natural light. There were many similar outcry floor exchanges across London, such as the Coal, Metal and Stock exchanges, but wartime bombing, fires, redevelopment and modernisation have left the Hop Exchange the only one still standing. However, a fire in 1920 led to the top two storeys being removed, and the Hop Exchange was then converted into offices.

In 2004 Southwark Council nominated the building for inclusion in the blue plaque scheme, but it was turned down.

The basement hosted Katzenjammers, a Bavarian-style beer hall. The beer hall business closed on 23 August, 2025 after 16 years of trading.

== Images ==
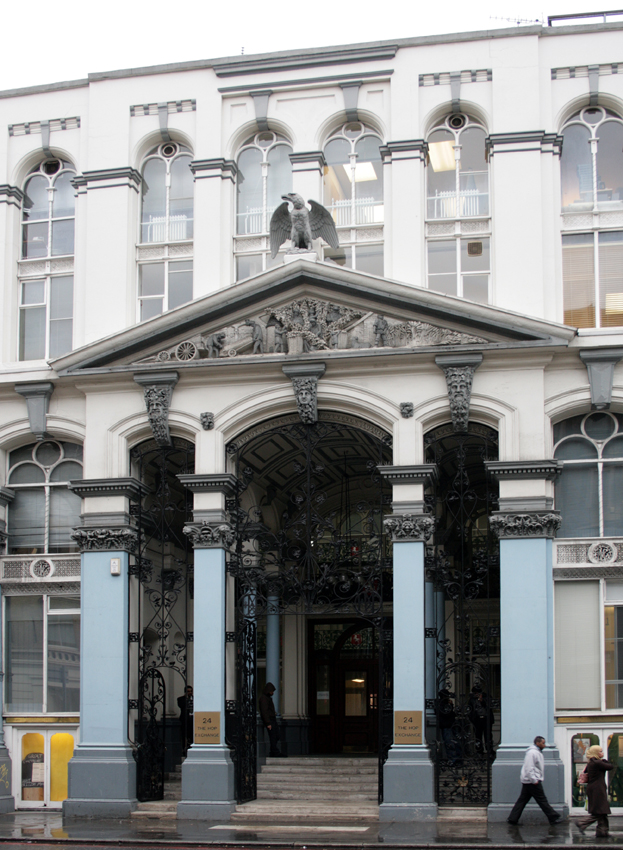
Entrance

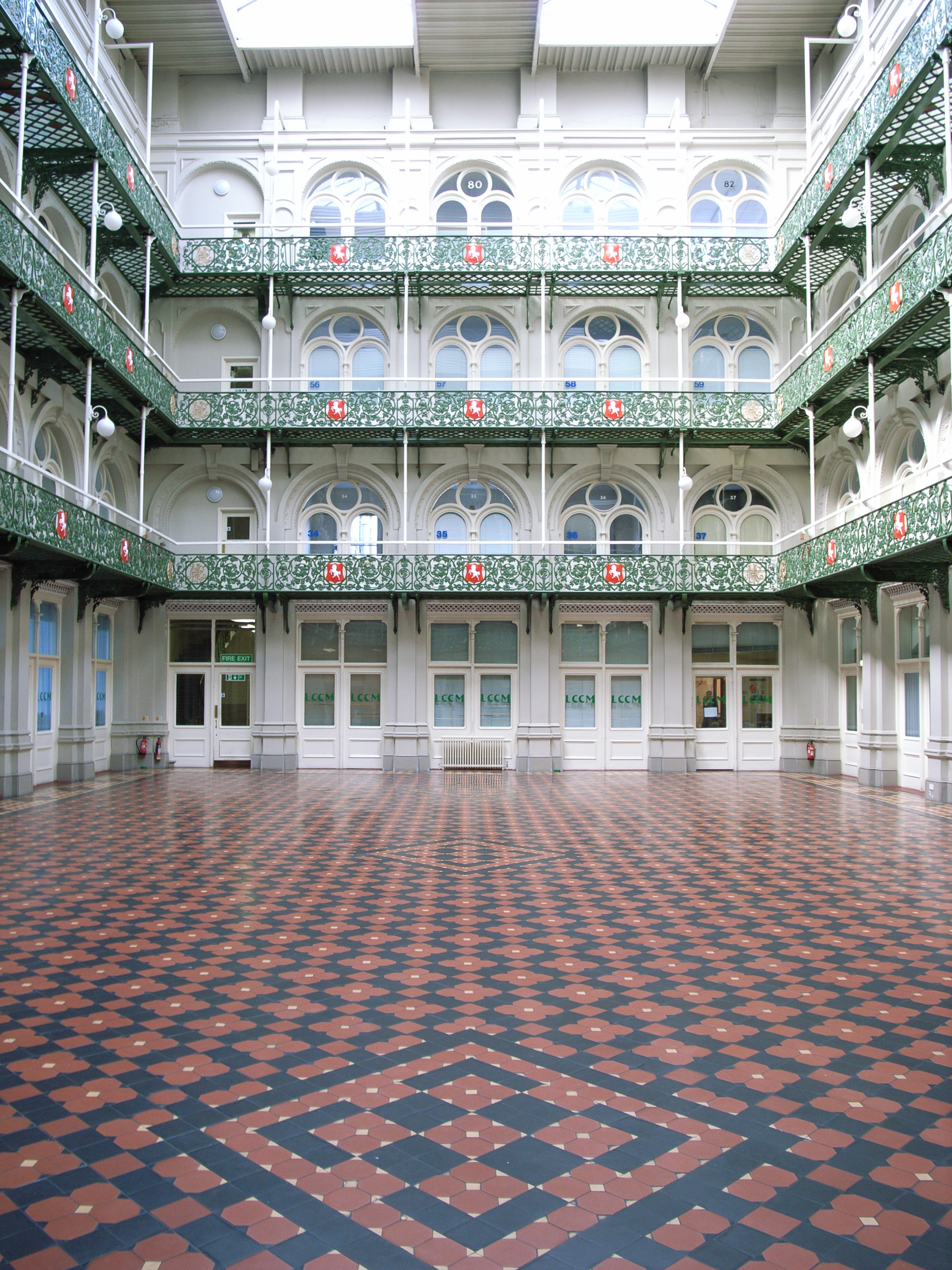
Great Hall
