= Southwark Street =

Street in Bankside, London

Coordinates: 51°30′20″N 0°06′01″W

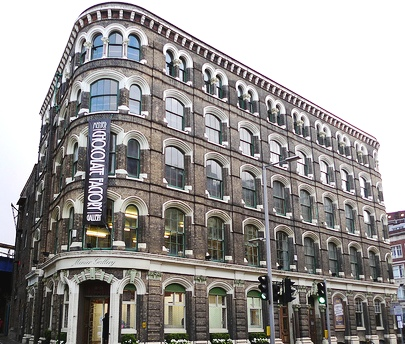
Menier Chocolate Factory

Southwark Street is a major street in Bankside in the London Borough of Southwark, in London England, just south of the River Thames. It runs between Blackfriars Road to the west and Borough High Street to the east. It also connects the access routes for London Bridge, Southwark Bridge and Blackfriars Bridge. At the eastern end to the north is Borough Market.

The road forms part of the A3200, which continues with Stamford Street to the west.

== History ==
In April 1856, the St Saviour's District Board petitioned the Metropolitan Board of Works to create a new street to run between the South Eastern Railway terminus at London Bridge station and the West End. The street was the first to be made by the Board and was completed in 1864. It was driven across a densely occupied part of the parish and crosses older roads and streets which created oddly shaped plots for redevelopment. Its junction with Borough High Street is so gently curved that the transition between the streets leads to confusion and imprecision as to which is which and the street numbering and lack of a street name plate compounds this, the break between them occurs at the junction with Bedale Street on the north-side but at the south-side the street does not begin until after the 'fork' opposite Stoney Street, some 130 metres to the west. Under the street, a tunnel was constructed with side passages to carry utilities such as gas, water, and drainage pipes, together with telegraph wires for communication. This was an advanced feature for the time.

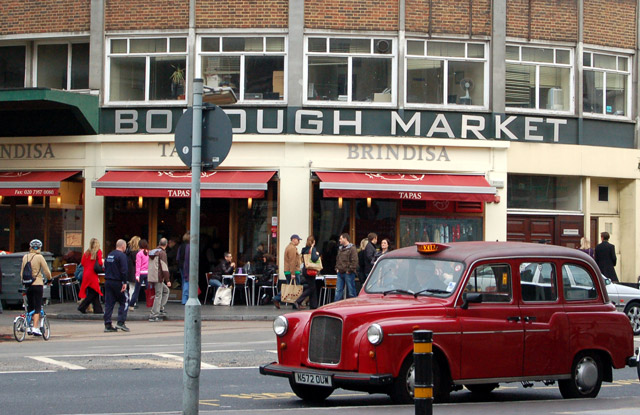
South facade of Borough Market on Southwark Street

During the first decade of the street's existence, many large commercial buildings were built along the street. The Hop Exchange, of 1874, is the most notable building at the northern side filling most of the quadrant formed by the street and the railway viaduct. Built in the 1870s, the former Menier Chocolate Factory on Southwark Street was converted to an arts complex that incorporates an art gallery, restaurant, and theatre, opening in 2004. In 1932 Borough Market built a formal gateway with administrative offices at Nos 6 and 8. In 1958 the Trustees erected a small office building at the junction with Stoney Street 'St Margaret's House'. At No 110, the western-end of the street, is the headquarters of IPC Media at the 'Blue Fin Building' completed in 2007.

The building on the south-west corner of the junction with Great Guildford Street is, unusually, numbered 59½. Another notable building is Bankside Studios at 76–80, which is cantilevered over the street and has multicoloured window frames.

== Public art ==
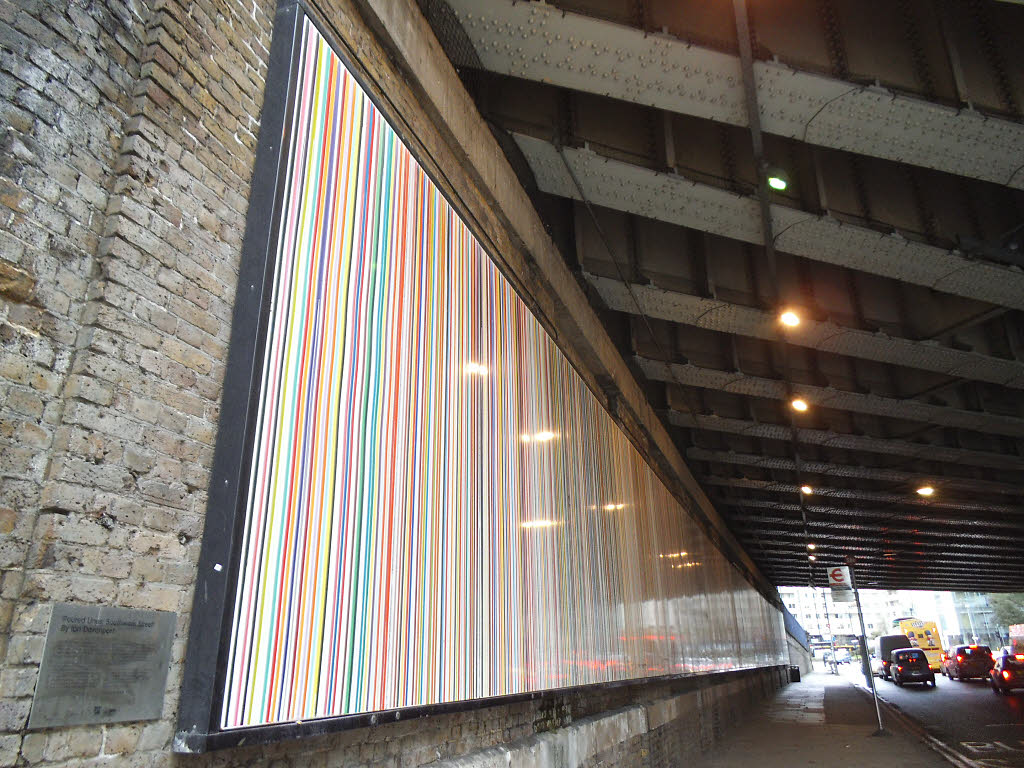
Poured Lines

Under the railway bridge carrying trains to Blackfriars Station from the south some urban art work has been placed on the south-side, whilst on the north-side the word 'Bankside' has been placed in very large lettering occupying most of the wall against the pavement. This is part of the area and tourist branding as the relationship with the ancient district of Bankside is tenuous, the most that can be said is that Southwark Street defines the southernmost limit of Bankside.

Ian Davenports' 2006 painting Poured Lines is displayed under the rail bridge at the western end of Southwark Street. It is the largest painting to be publicly displayed outdoors in the United Kingdom.
