= Exmouth Exodus =

The Exmouth Exodus is an annual semi-organised, through-the-night bicycle ride from Bath to Exmouth seafront on the weekend of the full moon in August. The ride is about 100 miles (161 km). The ride started as an alternative to the Dunwich Dynamo for people in the South West due to the distance and time to travel home from Dunwich.

Until 2013 the ride started from Channings pub in Bristol, however due to the increasing size of the ride and the opening of the Two Tunnels Greenway, the starting location had been changed to a more appropriate location for the large numbers.

== See also ==
Challenge riding

Dunwich Dynamo
