= Poured Lines =

2006 painting by Ian Davenport

Coordinates: 51°30′24.25″N 0°6′12.43″W

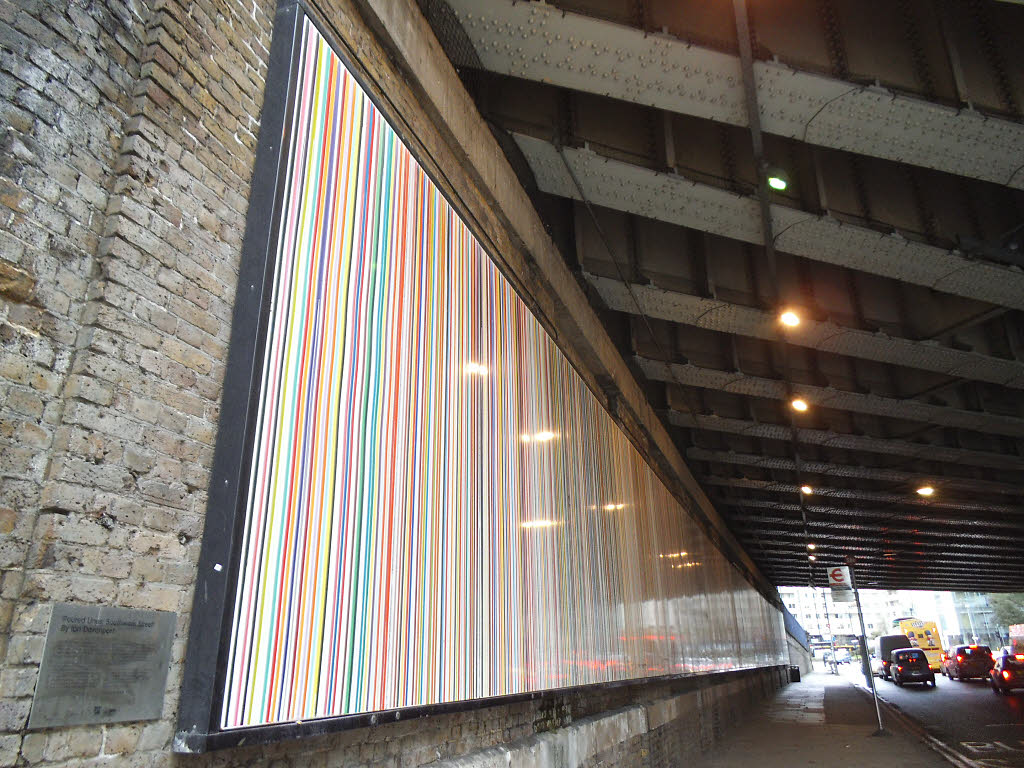
Poured Lines

Poured Lines is a 2006 painting by the British painter Ian Davenport. It is the largest painting to be publicly displayed outdoors in the United Kingdom. It is situated under the rail bridge at the western end of Southwark Street in London SE1.

== Description ==
The painting is 48 by 3 metres (157 ft × 10 ft) and made from fluid enamel painted on 48 individual steel panels measuring 1 by 3 metres (3 ft 3 in × 9 ft 10 in) each. The work took two years to make including six months spent researching materials and three and a half months to apply the 300 different colours to the panels with syringes.

It is designed to withstand the elements of a busy London street including rain, pigeons and the threat of vandalism. The metal panels were manufactured in a factory in Germany and baked in a furnace.

The panels can be swung out from the wall like doors so the bridge can be inspected by rail engineers. The piece was funded by the property developers Land Securities and Southwark Council at a cost of £290,000.

== Reception ==
Writing in The Telegraph in 2006 upon the painting's unveiling, Serena Davies described the individual panels as "some bright, some pastel some frenetic, some calm" that produce a "wave-like effect across the trajectory of the painting".

Richard Thomas, a councillor for Southwark said at the unveiling of Poured Lines that it would help to "reinforce the emergence of Bankside as the leading cultural quarter of London" and foresaw people "walking past it every day will be able to see subtleties and colour and textures".
