= Ron Haselden =

British artist, works with light, sound, film and video

Ron Haselden (born 1944) is a British artist who splits his time between London and the French coastal town of Plouër-sur-Rance, in Brittany, France. He works with light, sound, film and video, often as part of architectural projects.

He was born in Gravesend, Kent and in 1961 he was awarded an Andrew Grant scholarship to study sculpture at the Edinburgh College of Art. After graduation in 1966, he taught sculpture at Reading University, where he was noted for founding the mixed media area in the early 1970s, going on to teach at Slade School of Fine Art.

== Practice ==
=== Awards ===
- Sargant Fellowship at the British School at Rome.

=== Notable works ===
Frère Jacques (made in collaboration with Peter Cusack) combined a wall of light with children singing. In 1993 he created a twenty feet high new moon illuminating the front of the South London Gallery. Blue Passage (1999), made for the passageway between the South Bank and the BFI IMAX cinema in London, consists of 8000 blue LEDs sunk into the walls of the underpass. In 1994 his barometrically controlled light sculpture at Peckham Arch, London was completed which uplights the arch canopy from four tree-like light posts. In 2002 he was commissioned by Cleveland Arts to install the light sculpture 'Rose' into the Centre North East building in Middlesbrough.
