= Trinity Church Square =

Garden square in London, England

Coordinates: 51.4987°N 0.0938°W

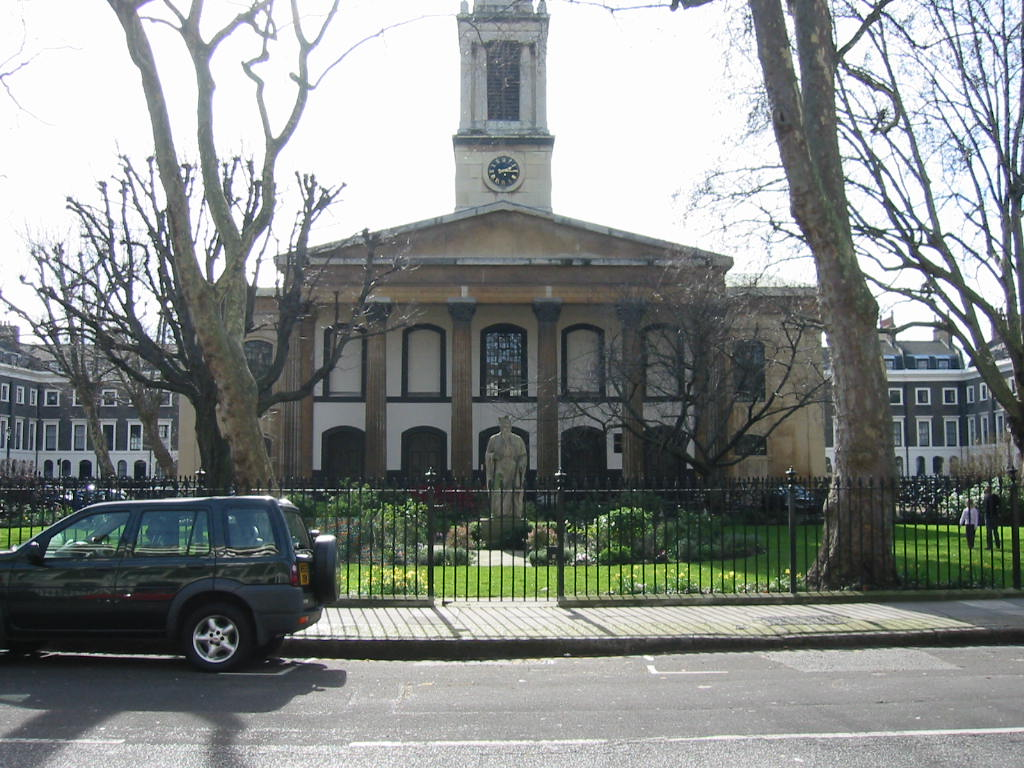
Trinity Church Square as seen from Trinity Street

Trinity Church Square, formerly known as Trinity Square, is a garden square in Newington in the London Borough of Southwark.

Trinity Church, in the centre of the square, has been the classical music rehearsal and recording venue Henry Wood Hall for nearly 50 years. It was built in 1824, and from 1826 to 1968 served as the parish church of the parish of Holy Trinity. It was declared redundant in 1968 and converted into an orchestral venue in 1975. The Church's high altar is now at St Agatha's, Landport.

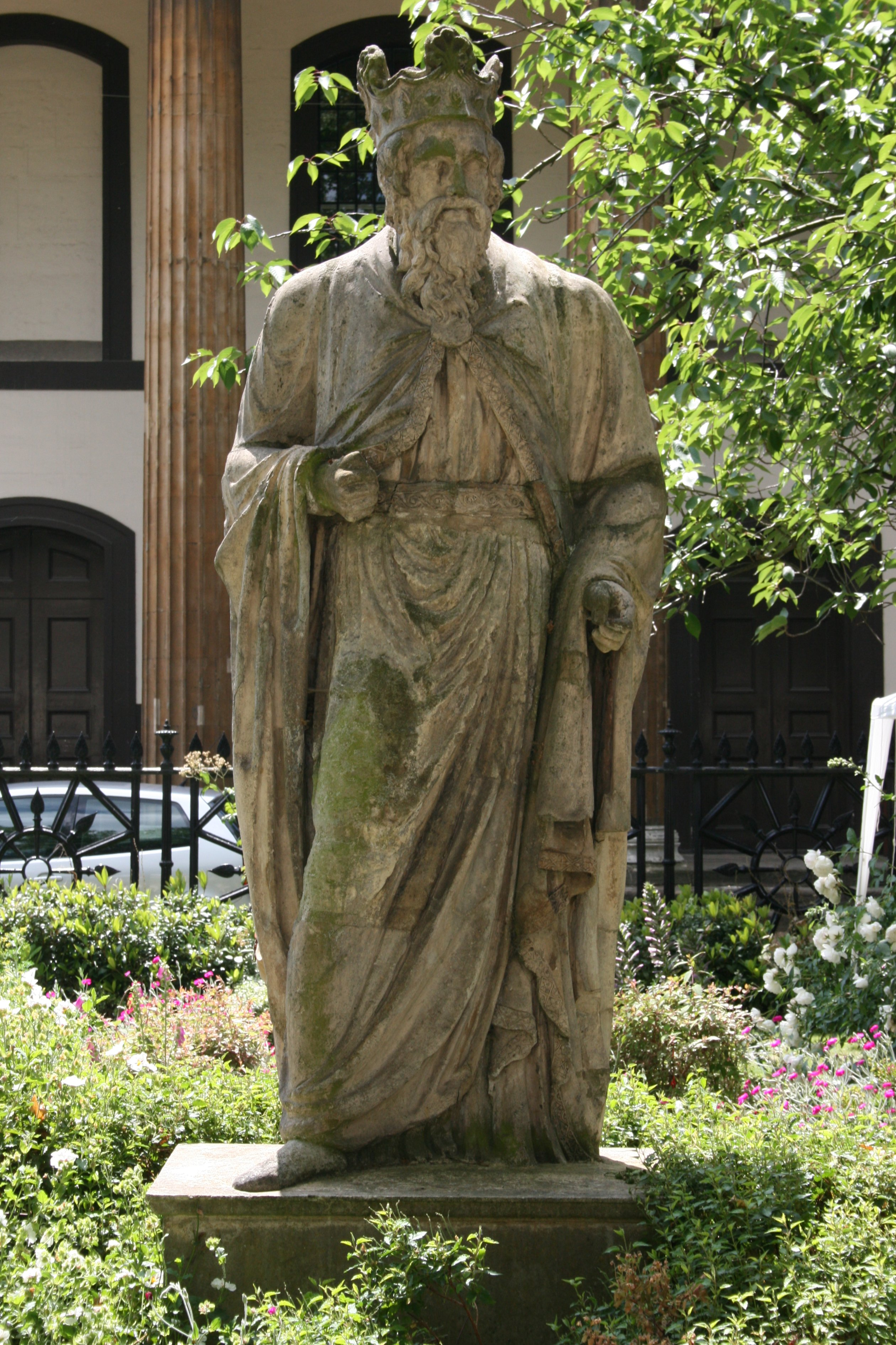
Alfred the Great statue

The statue of a king on the stone plinth in the square is Grade II listed. The statue was speculated to be one of eight medieval statues from the north end towers of Westminster Hall (c. late 14th century) or, alternatively, one of a pair representing Alfred the Great and Edward, the Black Prince made for the garden of Carlton House in the 18th century. Analysis in 2021 showed that the top part was of Coade stone but the legs were Roman and of Bath stone.

John Belcher lived at no 60 from 1849 to 1852, with his father, also an architect called John Belcher. They had previously lived nearby at 3 Montague Terrace (now 8 Brockham Street), where Belcher was born in 1841.

The publisher and bookseller William Tegg (1816–95), son of Thomas Tegg (1776–1845), lived at no 11 from 1848 to 1852.

The English Congregationalist divine Thomas Binney lived at no 40 from 1831 to 1832, and later lived at no 5.
