= Daniel Silver =

British sculptor

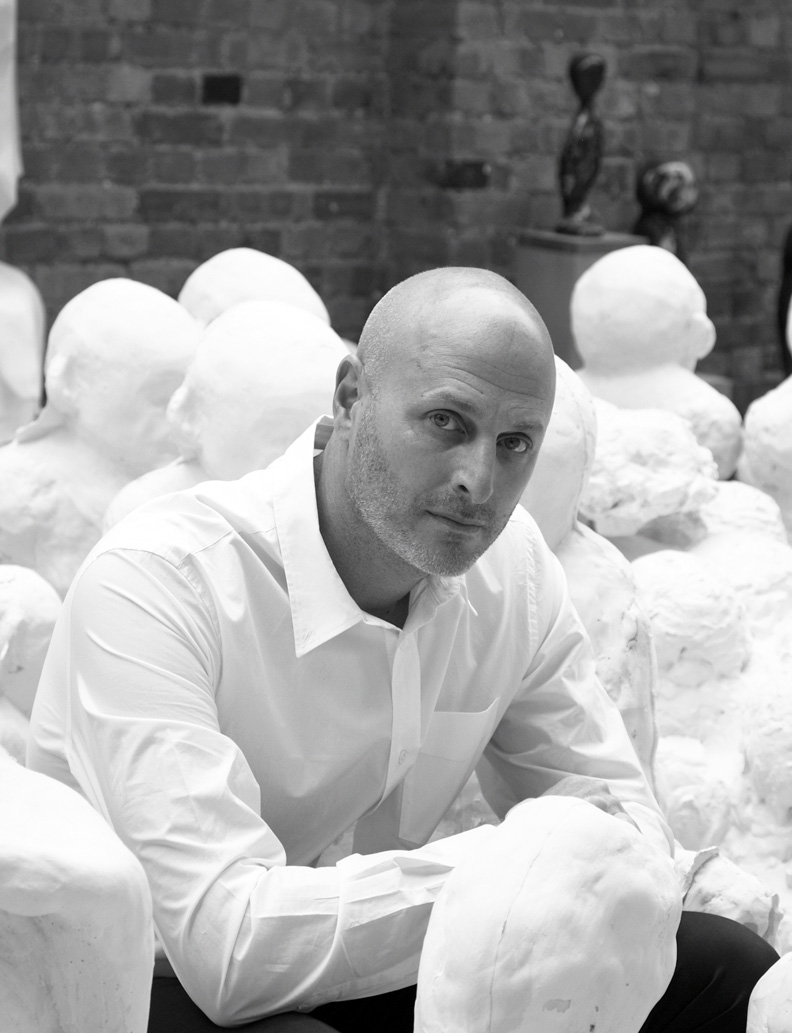
- Photo by Andrea Spotorno
- Born: 1972; London
- Education: Royal College of Art, Slade School of Art
- Known for: Sculpture
- Spouse: Tali Silver

Daniel Silver; (born 1972) is an artist living in London.

== Life and career ==
Silver was born in London. Silver studied at the Slade School of Art (BA Fine Art, 1999). He received his MA in Sculpture from the Royal College of Art, London in 2001. He went on to study sculpture in Italy at the British School at Rome in 2002. He has exhibited across the UK and internationally. Silver is represented by Frith Street Gallery London.

== Work ==
Silver's work includes sculpture, painting, drawing and installation. His work draws from ancient sculptural archetypes and modernist sculptors, like Jacob Epstein and Henri Gaudier-Brzeska. Despite its references to figurative sculptural traditions, the former director of the Museu Nacional de Belas Artes (Rio de Janeiro) Paulo Herkenhoff described Daniel Silver’s sculpture as a “dyslexic body” which “refuses to follow a canon, or an established grammar which builds meanings, or work in pre-mapped territory”.

Silver explores and manipulates the sculptural figure in his work. As his practice has developed he has examined the physical and emotional impact of the body and its representation. He has said that he is particularly interested in the head as his subject. “The reason I make the head is, on the one hand to continue the bust-making tradition, and on the other that they are the most interesting part of the body, the most object-like part of the body.”

== Exhibitions ==
Silver's projects include Dig, a commission by producers, Artangel. This sculptural installation was located in Grafton Way, into a derelict site where once was located one of London's largest Odeon Cinemas. Silver presented an imagined archeological dig of sculptures looking both ancient and futuristic, conceived by the artist as a “history of sculpture”. The project is inspired by Freud’s collection of antiques, which was used by Freud as a reservoir of metaphors to interpret his patients' traumatic experiences. Similarly, Silver is interested in the psychological and emotional dimension of sculpture and to investigate its relation with memory and history. In an interview with Ben Luke, Silver explained that "To be an archaeologist is about understanding our past through objects. I’m also trying to figure out things that are more psychological, about us as people, and objects throughout time allow me to do that.”

=== Selected exhibitions ===
- Looking, Fruitmarket Gallery, Edinburgh (2022)
- Daniel Silver, London Mithraeum Bloomberg SPACE, London (2019)
- Daniel Silver, The New Art Gallery, Walsall (2019)
- Daniel Silver, Frith Street Gallery, London (2018)
- Rock Formations, Antikenmuseum, Basel, Switzerland for Art Basel Parcours (2015)
- Plaster: Casts & Copies, The Hepworth, Wakefield, West Yorkshire (2015)
- A Statue is Present, The Royal College of Psychiatrists, London (2015)
- Rock Formations, Frith Street Gallery, London (2015)
- A Thousand Doors, Whitechapel Gallery and NEON (Gennadius Library), Athens (2014)
- Dig, Artangel, London, UK (2013)
- Coming Together, Kunsthaus Glarus, Switzerland (2011)
- The Smoking Silver Father Figures, Frieze Sculpture Park, London UK (2010)
- Newspeak: British Art Now, State Hermitage Museum, St Petersburg and Saatchi Gallery, London (2009)
- Making Something Your Own, IBID PROJECTS, London, UK (2008)
- Heads, Camden Arts Centre, London, UK (2007)
- Demos, Northern Gallery for Contemporary Art, Sunderland, UK (2007)

== Awards ==
Silver is a recipient of the Henry Moore Artist in Residency (2005), Rome Scholar in Fine Arts, The British School at Rome (2002), Credit Suisse First Boston Award, US (2001) and the Sharett Scholarship, America Israel Cultural Foundation, New York, US (2000).

== Selected bibliography ==
- Daniel Silver: Dig. Published by Artangel (2013)
- Daniel Silver. Published by Art Editions North (2007)
