= Statue of Alfred the Great, Southwark =

Statue in Trinity Church Square, London

Statue of Alfred the Great
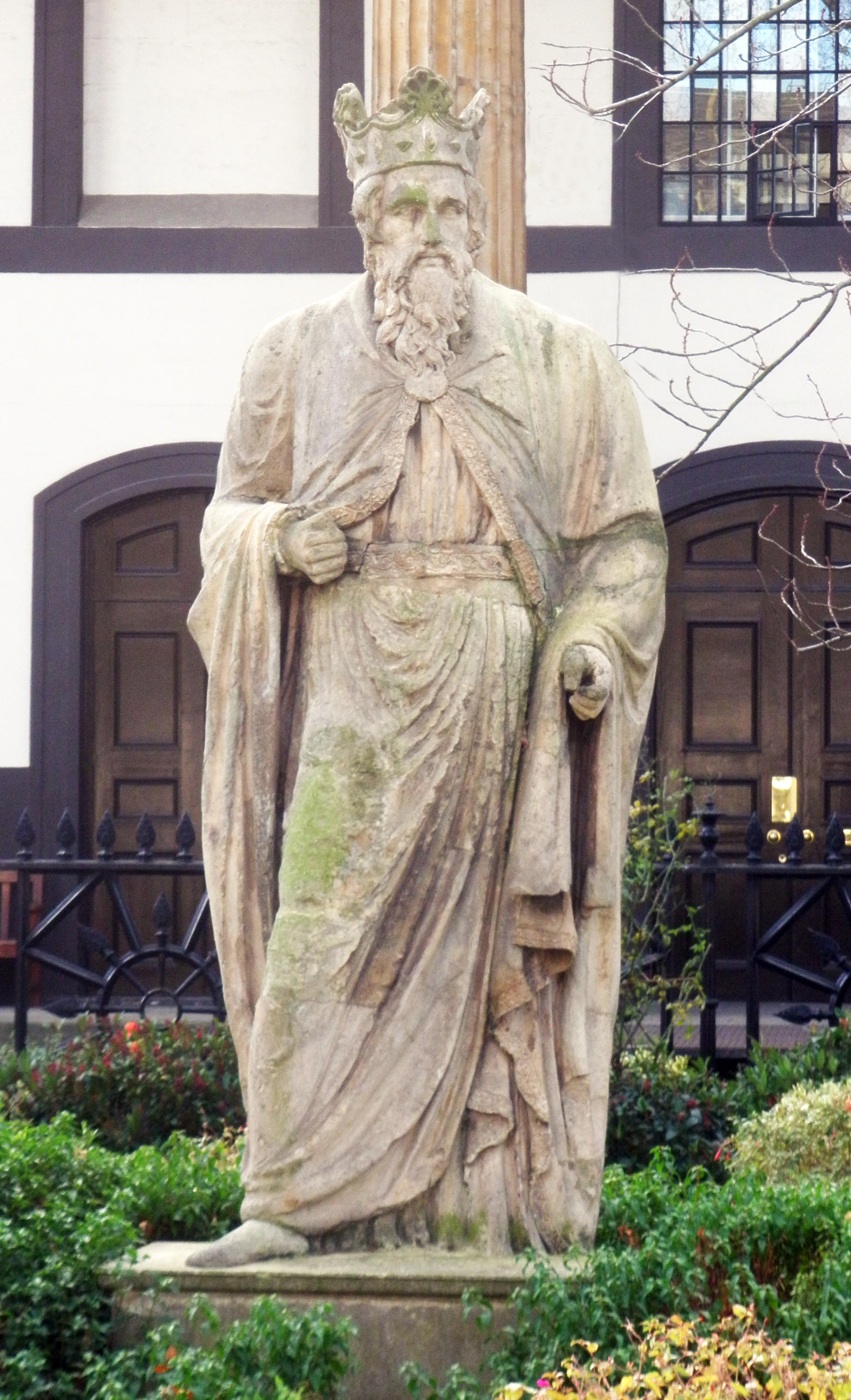
- Pictured in 2009
- Interactive map of Statue of Alfred the Great
- Location: Southwark
- Coordinates: 51°29′56″N 0°05′37″W
- Material: Coade stone and Bath stone

Listed Building – Grade II
- Official name: Statue in Centre of Trinity Church Square
- Designated: 2 March 1950
- Reference no.: 1385998

The statue of Alfred the Great in Southwark is thought to be London's oldest outdoor statue. The lower portion comes from a Roman statue dating to the late 1st or early 2nd century AD, while the top portion is a late 18th- or early 19th-century Coade stone addition in medieval style.

== Description ==
The statue stands in the garden in the centre of Trinity Church Square in Southwark. It stands 2.6 metres (8.5 ft) high and depicts a broad-shouldered, bearded man wearing robes and a crown. It is thought to depict the 9th-century Anglo-Saxon king Alfred the Great. The rear of the statue is quite plain, and it may have been intended for display in a niche.

The garden is usually private and accessible only by residents of the road, but was opened to the public for the first time on a temporary basis in November 2021. The statue itself is visible from the public streets in the square around the garden. The statue was granted protection as a Grade II listed building on 2 March 1950.

== Provenance ==
The provenance of the statue is not known. It has stood in the square since 1836 but is thought to have originally been displayed elsewhere. The National Heritage List for England describes the statue as late 14th-century in style and notes that it is said to be one of eight statues from the northern frontage of Richard II's Westminster Hall, or alternatively one of a pair (with a statue of Edward the Black Prince) made in the 18th century for the garden of Carlton House, Westminster. The Westminster Hall statues were removed by Sir John Soane in around 1825 during alterations to the Palace of Westminster. The statue has for a long time been considered the oldest outdoor statue in London.

The Heritage of London Trust commissioned London Stone Conservation to carry out restoration works on the statue in 2021. As part of the works it was discovered that the lower portion of the statue was Roman in origin and dated to 80–130 AD. It is likely that the statue once stood in a sanctuary in nearby Tabard Square. Because of the strict design parameters of Roman temple statuary of this period the statue has been identified as probably one to Minerva, due to its similarity to a smaller statue of the goddess in the Duke of Bedford's collection at Woburn Abbey. Minerva was the Roman goddess of handicraft, professions, arts and, in later periods, of war.

The Roman portion is of Bath stone and is likely to have been transported from the Cotswolds by barge along the Thames. It is thought to have been sculpted by a craftsman brought over from continental Europe. The leg of Minerva is disproportionate for the depiction of Alfred. By extrapolation the height of the original statue of Minerva has been estimated to have been 3 metres (9.8 ft) tall. This would make the statue the largest known Roman-era statue from British-quarried stone. The discovery that the lower portion is of Bath stone rules out any association of the statue with Richard II's Westminster Hall, whose statues were of Reigate stone.

The 2021 conservation works confirmed that the top half of the statue is of Coade stone, which was developed from the 1770s. The work to combine this with the Roman lower portion would have been complicated as Coade stone shrinks during its four-day kiln firing. It is thought likely that the lower portion was discovered during the late 18th century and, being thought to be medieval in origin, was used to give the Alfred statue more authenticity.
