= Antony Donaldson =

British pop painter (1939–2026)

- Born: 2 September 1939; Godalming, Surrey, England
- Died: 21 August 2026 (aged 86)
- Known for: Sculptor, painter, artist
- Movement: Pop art
- Spouse: Patricia Marks
- Children: Matthew Donaldson, 1961; Lee Donaldson, 1963

Antony Donaldson (2 September 1939 – 21 August 2026) was a British painter and sculptor, working in London from the beginning of the 1960s. Notable for his development of visual interplay between abstract and popular imagery, his work is associated with the pop art movement and known for his paintings of fast cars and women.

Throughout his career, Donaldson has exhibited extensively in Europe and all over the world and accomplished public and private commissions (especially in Japan and Hong Kong), but also producing many works for architectural projects in London such as the fountain at Tower Bridge Piazza and the large torso in Anchor Court. Later in his career Donaldson turned more to sculpture, using a variety of materials and media.

His works are part of a number of public collections including the British Museum, Museum of Modern Art in New York City, the Tate in London, Berardo Collection Museum and Calouste Gulbenkian Foundation in Lisbon, the Walker Art Gallery in Liverpool, Olinda Museums in Pernambuco, Brazil, and the Art Gallery of New South Wales in Australia.

Donaldson lived and worked between London and southwest France.

== Early life and education ==
Antony Donaldson was born in Godalming, Surrey on 2 September 1939. He was the son of a fighter pilot, Squadron Leader John William Donaldson, who was killed in action on 8 June 1940. After his father's death, an itinerant life style followed, starting with boarding school at the age of 5.

Between 1957 and 1958, he studied at Regent Street Polytechnic School of Art, now known as University of Westminster and, from 1958 to 1962, at Slade School of Fine Art, obtaining a London University postgraduateship of fine art in 1962–3.

From 1958, while he was a student, he had been involved in exhibiting with the Young Contemporaries and The London Group. But it was in 1962, while he was still attending the Slade School of Fine Art, that he become known, when he was elected President of the Young Contemporaries for that year.

Although he never studied at the Royal College of Art, Antony Donaldson's friendships with RCA students Patrick Caulfield, Allen Jones and Peter Phillips put him firmly in the vanguard of the pop art movement in London in the early sixties.

In those years, the predominant influences on the London art scene, were Social Realism and the Abstract painting from New York City. The 1962 Young Contemporaries Exhibition, that followed directly after Phillips's Presidency of the Young Contemporaries, let dynamic new works emerge in the style then thought of as New Figuration. At that point, a deep interest arose around those young artists and their way of interpreting figurative painting. So much so that even the English press fully caught on to critic Lawrence Alloway's term Pop Art for works of this nature.

== Art career ==
=== Early 1960s ===
In 1962, Donaldson conceived his simplified treatment of the female figure that characterised his production over the next five years. These beautiful, young and sexually confident women seemed to be caught in alluring poses and reveal themselves almost only to the viewer's gaze. Their faces are depicted in a generalised way, to emphasise the fact that these are not portraits of particular individuals but alluring images in the mind of a young man.

Before the sixties English art had never really had female sensuality as its subject matter. Donaldson was in the vanguard of that change and, as Marco Livingstone has written, his ladies, early and late, while "sexually alluring" on one side, also "exude a certain innocence" on the other, making the possible reading of an objectification of women in a male-dominated society remote. Other subjects coming in the upcoming year – racing cars, planes, searchlight beams – are no less sensually described.

Marco Livingstone wrote ‘A startling characteristic of British Pop was the speed and confidence with which many of the artists discovered their language and subject matter at a very early age. Donaldson whose first boldly simplified, exuberantly colourful, large scale and sexy Pop canvases were created in 1962 when he was just 23 is no exception.’

On winning a post-graduateship in Fine Art from UCL in 1962, Donaldson was hard pressed to continue his studies, while supporting a young family and was encouraged to do so with the help of William Coldstream and Lawrence Gowing who invited him to teach part-time at Chelsea School of Art. John Hoyland, Allen Jones, Jeremy Moon (artist) and Ian Stephenson were among others, teaching there at the time. The following year Patrick Caulfield joined them.

Donaldson became popular in 1963 when, on the occasion of a critically acclaimed first solo show at the Rowan Gallery, London, the Tate Gallery purchased the work ‘Take Five’. Other works were also purchased by the British Council and The Contemporary Art Society, The Arts Council of Great Britain having already acquired a work from a former group exhibition in 1962.

During 1964 he won a prize in the open section of the John Moores Painting Prize, Liverpool and was one of twelve young artists selected by Bryan Robertson to show in ‘The New Generation’ exhibition at the Whitechapel Gallery, London, which included Derek Boshier, Patrick Caulfield, David Hockney, John Hoyland, Allen Jones, Peter Phillips and Bridget Riley.

In 1965 he represented Great Britain with Patrick Caulfield, John Hoyland, Paul Huxley and Bridget Riley at the 4eme Biennale des Jeunes Artists at the Musée d'art moderne de Paris.

The works from the 1960s reflect a post-war society wanting to enjoy their bodies and the newly-obtainable goods in equal measure. Antony Donaldson appropriated the language of advertising that was emerging in those years, which acted on the conscious and unconscious desires of the public through the erotic element, showing the female body in whatever state of undress to attract attention to some product or other. However, the boldness of his subjects in no way precluded lyricism or romanticism; rather, it pushed him toward greater realism, in step with his era, capturing the essence of evolving habits. "His paintings were in splendid osmosis with his time, eagerly incorporating other evolving art forms: film, music, literature, dance, and architecture". Writing on Donaldson in the catalogue of The New Generation 1964 exhibition, David Thompson states that ‘the advent of "Pop Art", whatever else it has done, has at least made a nonsense of the figurative-abstract controversy. It has settled any worries about the relation of art to life, and left the painter free to explore what, in an abstract sense, is visually interesting about his chosen motifs. Shapes here are repeated so that the peculiarity and character and transient changeability of certain images are brought out. The painting is flat and "hard-edged", emphasising contrasts of pattern and field, throwing up the fresh, cheerful colour, so that Matisse has as much to do with it as bill-boards or advertising ... His is rather the attitude of a painter who wants to see his activity as a skilled technique, not as an indulgence in self-expression. His simplifications (the elimination of eyes and mouth in a face, for example) concentrate on the essentials of form to avoid the banality of "expressiveness" ... His repeated and mirrored shapes, like stills from a film-strip, register how from moment to moment an image can be the same and yet different each time, and this in itself is a pattern, as independent of the artist as his finished painting’.

Among the characteristics that make Donaldson's works recognisable is the repetition of a single image together with the seriality of the works. The resulting image has the effect of a stroboscopic decomposition, in slow motion.

‘For Antony Donaldson, as for Arman and Andy Warhol, it would seem that repetition is a way of establishing a certain distance from things. But whereas in the case of Warhol that implies a macabre and mechanical coldness, with Donaldson it principally gives substance to a new conceptual abstraction tending more towards pleasure, disconcerting and subverting the very myth of the original. In this way, it offers an intensification of life, and a realisation of the very essence of art.'

=== Travel to United States ===
Awarded a Harkness Foundation Fellowship in 1966, to live and work in the United States for two years, he went to Los Angeles where he met up with Joe Goode, Bob Graham, Ed Ruscha, Kenny Price and Ed Moses (artist), among many eminent artists working there at this time.

The years he spent in L.A. had an impact on his work, which is evident in the series of large canvasses dedicated to cinemas. "With these there is an exploration of isometric and axonometric perspectives, in which the three dimensions of space are given equal importance. Their modernist architecture, influenced by cubism with echoing shapes, ornamental zigzags, monumental formal volumes, geometrical fullness, and a volumetric frenzy made all the more vivid in the inimitable Californian light."

1968 marked the ‘beginning of a time of "unbridled enjoyment" in which taboos were challenged, girls wore trousers and bikinis, and went topless on the beach. In his panels, as well as the traditional treatment of water that evokes purity, and freshness, the painter tackled other notions he holds dear: movements, reflections, transparency, plays of light, the relationship between sky and liquid surface, and between fluidity and solidity, the way in which water deconstructs the sunlight, and the graceful emergence of forms. The realistic depiction of bodies is emphasised by their glow, achieved thanks to the lacquered acrylic on a fibreglass base’.

=== Antony Donaldson: Portraits ===
"I arrived in Los Angeles from London in October 1966 the same time as Bob Graham, the sculptor, arrived from San Jose. I had met Ed Ruscha and Joe Goode in London before. Joe lent us his house in LA while we looked for a place. When we had found one we realised that we all lived within walking distance of each other and used to have an occasional breakfast together. At the beginning of 1971 back in London I asked 10 friends to come to my studio in their favourite shirt so I could paint a portrait of them. I only painted a centre section of their shirt but I found there was a strange likeness."
— Antony Donaldson in his private correspondence with Renaud Faroux, January 2021

Portrait of Bob Graham and Portrait of Andrew Rabeneck are from a series of works of 1971 that represented a new departure for Donaldson. These works had been exhibited in the exhibition Antony Donaldson: Portraits, held at the Rowan Gallery, London in 1972. William Packer wrote 'His new paintings at the Rowan were all conceived, rather wryly, as portraits. They are, in fact, images of the shirtfronts of ten friends, male and female, taking in only the area of the rib cage. They all occupy the centre of their canvas, and then merge gradually into the sprayed ground. And these images, far from being coolly delineated, are delicate and elusive. Pattern and texture are read for themselves at first, and then a description of the form which they conceal begins to emerge. Through this reticence the images acquire an unexpected power. A button falling open, revealing a patch of throat, or just bare flesh, the veiled suggestion of the swelling of a breast, subtle nuances of pressure and tension, all lead us to the sensual and physical reality behind the image. But the important thing for Donaldson is that this work marks a move away from the manipulation of the imagery, or its self-conscious presentation, into an altogether more painterly mode, where the preoccupation is instead with the process of realisation of the image, and its relationship to its source'.

=== French paintings ===
In 1973 in the middle of a series of Beach Paintings he painted a circular version of Jean-Auguste-Dominique Ingres’ The Turkish Bath called ‘Tahiti Plage’. In 2006 he went back to the idea and made a series called ‘French Paintings’. Donaldson's 1973 prototype was in a Tondo format, like the Ingres, whereas for the new paintings he decided to house the circular composition within a square format, allowing the freedom to break out of that circle. It was only when Donaldson was well into the series that he discovered that Ingres had started with the format that he chose for himself when making his own version of the subject.

=== Later years ===
In later years Donaldson took up sculpture in a variety of media, including carving in marble. His most famous piece is the giant Buddha-like head of Alfred Hitchcock, in the courtyard of the Gainsborough Picture studios in London, where Hitchcock first directed. ‘I was asked to do something for Gainsborough Picture studios so it was my idea to make it of Hitchcock. But London's full of monuments to people looking like the people and I wanted it to be much more spiritual. I was in Hong Kong and I went to see this enormous Buddha on the top a mountain, absolutely vast. It wasn't particularly good but it was impressive so I thought the sculpture should be Buddha-esque, also because Hitchcock has that sort of quality.’

"I am now nearly 80. There is one thing about painting that is quite remarkable: as soon as you put colour on canvas, your world changes – and you hope that it will also change other people’s lives. Even if at first you are doing it essentially for yourself. Being creative is the most selfish activity there is. You always hope to leave a trace of yourself in the history of art." |-	— Antony Donaldson in his private correspondence with Renaud Faroux, January 2021

== Death ==
Donaldson died after a short illness on 21 August 2026, aged 86.

== Notable works ==
- "Take Five" (1962, oil on canvas, 153 × 153 cm, Tate Gallery, London).
- "Jim Clark" (1963, oil on canvas, 153 × 153 cm, Private collection, Italy)
- "Four" (1964, oil on canvas, 168 × 168 cm, Private collection, London)
- "Fly the Friendly Skies" (1966, liquitex on cotton duck, 229 × 229 cm, Private Collection, France)
- "Portrait of Bob Graham" (1971, liquitex on cotton duck, 166 × 166 cm, Private Collection)
- "Portrait of Andrew Rabeneck" (1971, liquitex on cotton duck, 166 × 166 cm, collection of the Artist)
- "Ce soir in Tunisie... 15 May 1953" (2007, acrylic on board, 122 × 122 cm, collection of the Artist)
- "Master of Suspense" (2003, corten and steel, size with base 25 × 11 × 9 m, Gainsborough Picture studios, London)
