= Peckham Arch =

Architectural structure in London

Coordinates: 51.473772°N 0.069636°W

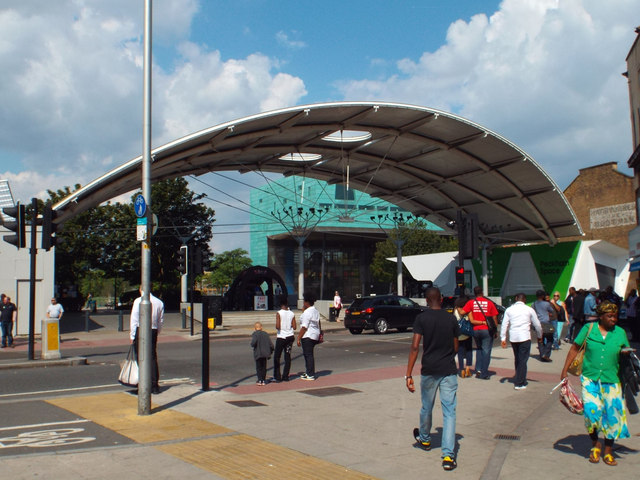
Peckham Arch

The Peckham Arch is a 35m-span structure at the north end of Rye Lane in Peckham, London. It was constructed in 1994 and was designed by the architects Troughton McAslan as monument to and an instigator of regeneration in a borough which had suffered from years of decline. The Arch was the first of three capital projects around Peckham Square and was followed by the construction of Peckham Library, completed in 2000. The Arch is home to a light sculpture conceived by the artist Ron Haselden.

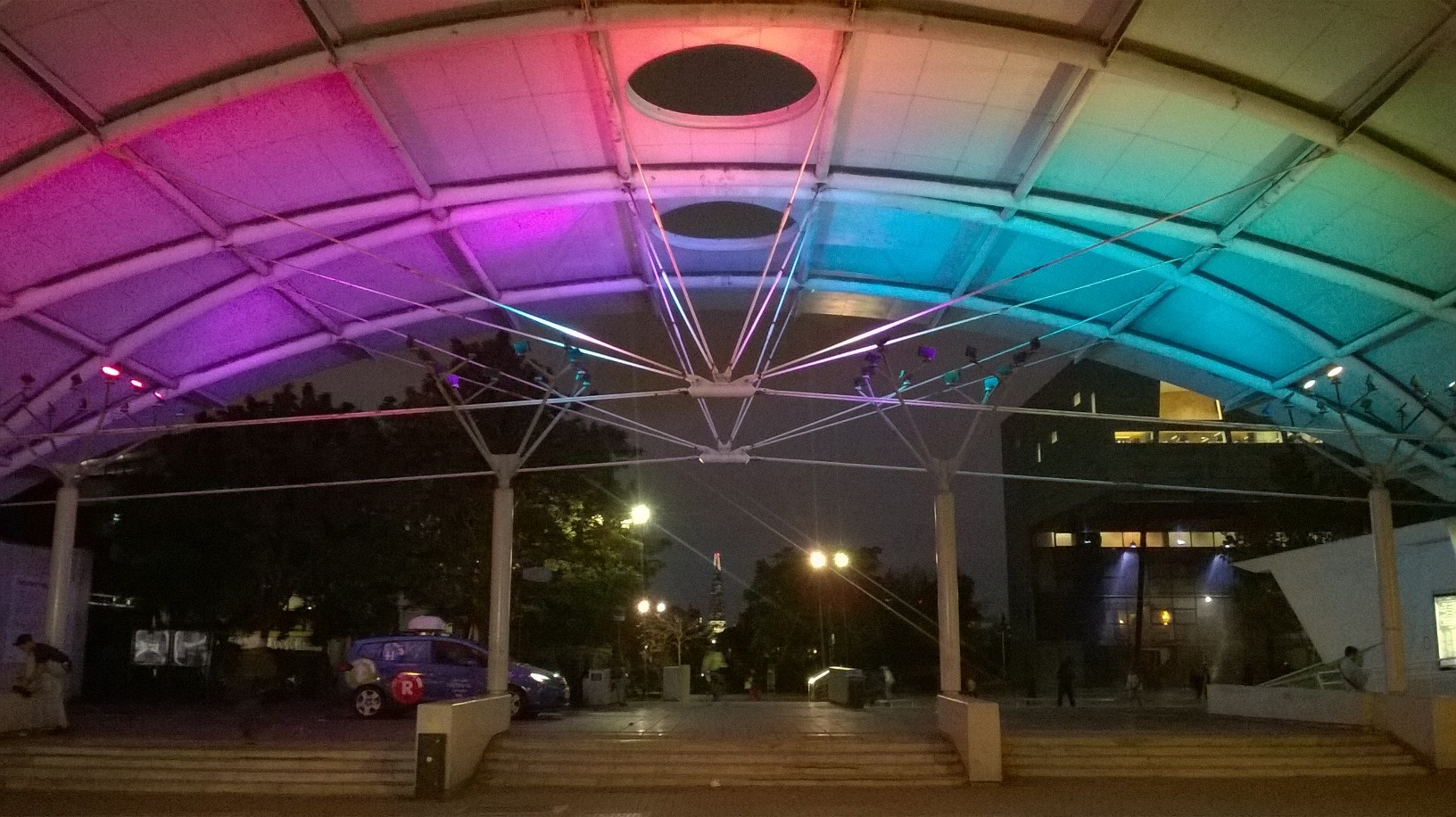
Peckham Arch by night

== Potential demolition ==
In November 2016 it was announced that the Arch would be demolished to make way for new blocks of flats. A 2015 plan for the site included a total of 100 flats across nine sites surrounding the square, were the arch to be removed. Removal of the arch will allow for the construction of two new four- and six-storey buildings, containing 19 flats, six of which will be social housing; two of these will be within existing buildings at 91–93 Peckham High Street. Community campaigners have criticised Southwark London Borough Council's scheme for occupying and selling off rare covered public space for private development. The scheme has been further criticised for failing to demonstrate public support for removal of the arch. Mature trees and a green link connecting Rye Lane to Burgess Park would also be lost if the arch were to be demolished. A local architect, Benedict O'Looney, said it would be a "great tragedy" if the arch were removed, branding the council's proposal as "insane" and describing it as "an iconic symbol of Peckham". In 2016 the borough turned down an application placed by 21 Southwark residents to list Peckham Arch as an "Asset of Community Value". Planning permission for Southwark Council's proposal was granted in November 2016 and expired in November 2019.
