= Stuart Williamson =

English sculptor and painter

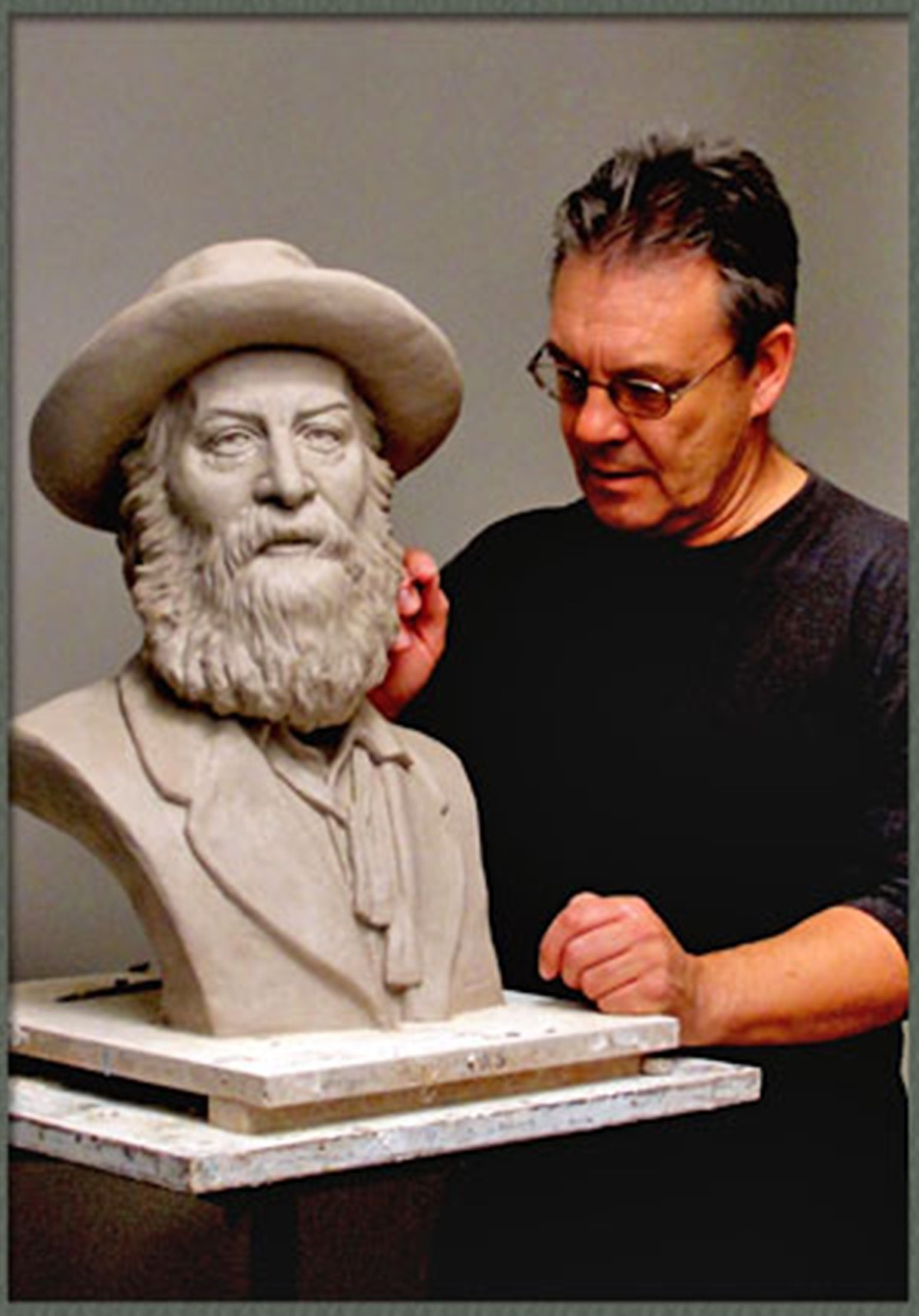
Stuart Williamson sculpting Walt Whitman

Stuart Williamson (born 1948, England) is a sculptor, teacher of sculpture and poet from North East England. He is a Fellow of the Royal British Society of Sculptors, a Member of the Society of Portrait Sculptors (UK), a Member of the National Sculpture Society (USA), and a Founding Member of the Portrait Sculptures Society of America. He is also a Member of the Salmagundi Club in Manhattan and was featured in their American Masters show in 2015.

== Sculptures of contemporary figures ==
Williamson was formerly senior sculptor for Madam Tussauds at their London studio and there and abroad conducted sittings for sculpture with many notable contemporary persons and celebrities, including Sophie, Countess of Wessex, Chinese leader Jiang Zemin, Sting, Little Richard, Eric Clapton, Bette Midler, Tony Bennett, Shirley MacLaine, Morgan Freeman, Michael Caine, Pavarotti, Australian singer Kylie Minogue, and Bollywood actor Amitabh Bachchan.

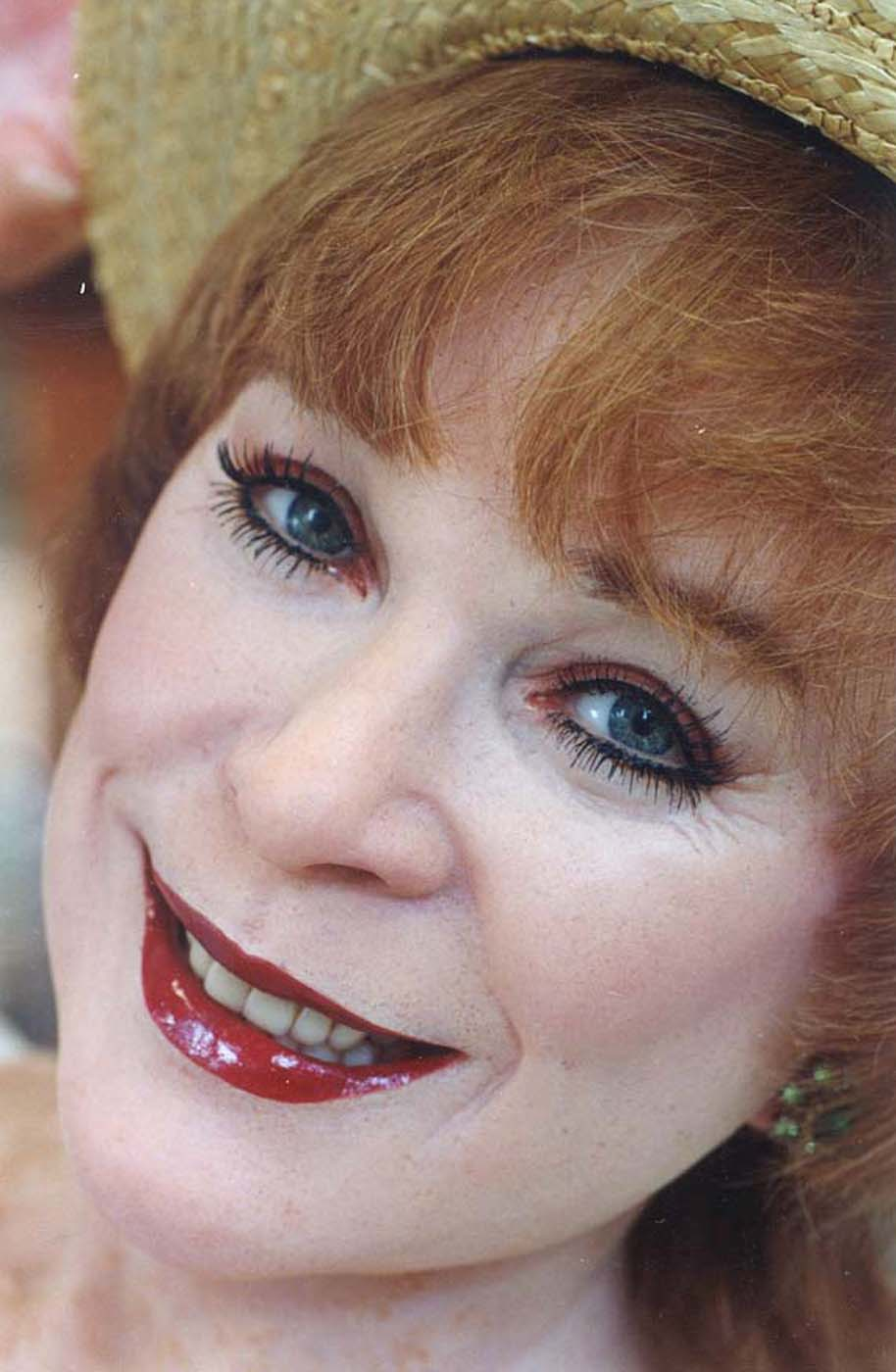
Shirley MacLaine wax sculpture by Stuart Williamson

== Sculptures of historical figures ==
Lincoln Statue at Lincoln Summer Home, Washington, D.C LCCN2010630087

The artist has sculpted, or collaborated on the sculpting, of numerous historical figures both in wax and bronze. He sculpted three portraits of George Washington at three stages of Washington's life for Mount Vernon, Abraham Lincoln for both the Gettysburg Museum and Visitor Center and the President Lincoln's Cottage at the Soldiers' Home, and Simon Bolivar for a private collection. He led the team and established the sculptural style for the sculpting of Benjamin Franklin, George Washington and five other signers for the National Constitution Center in Philadelphia, sculpted Albert Einstein for the Griffith Observatory in Los Angeles, Thomas Jefferson for Monticello, Franklin Roosevelt and Eleanor Roosevelt for the Franklin D. Roosevelt Presidential Library and Museum in New York, Robert E. Lee for the Stratford Hall (plantation) Museum in Virginia, Harry S. Truman for the Harry S. Truman Presidential Library and Museum in Missouri, poet John Keats for Guy's Hospital in London and poet Walt Whitman for a private client in Michigan.

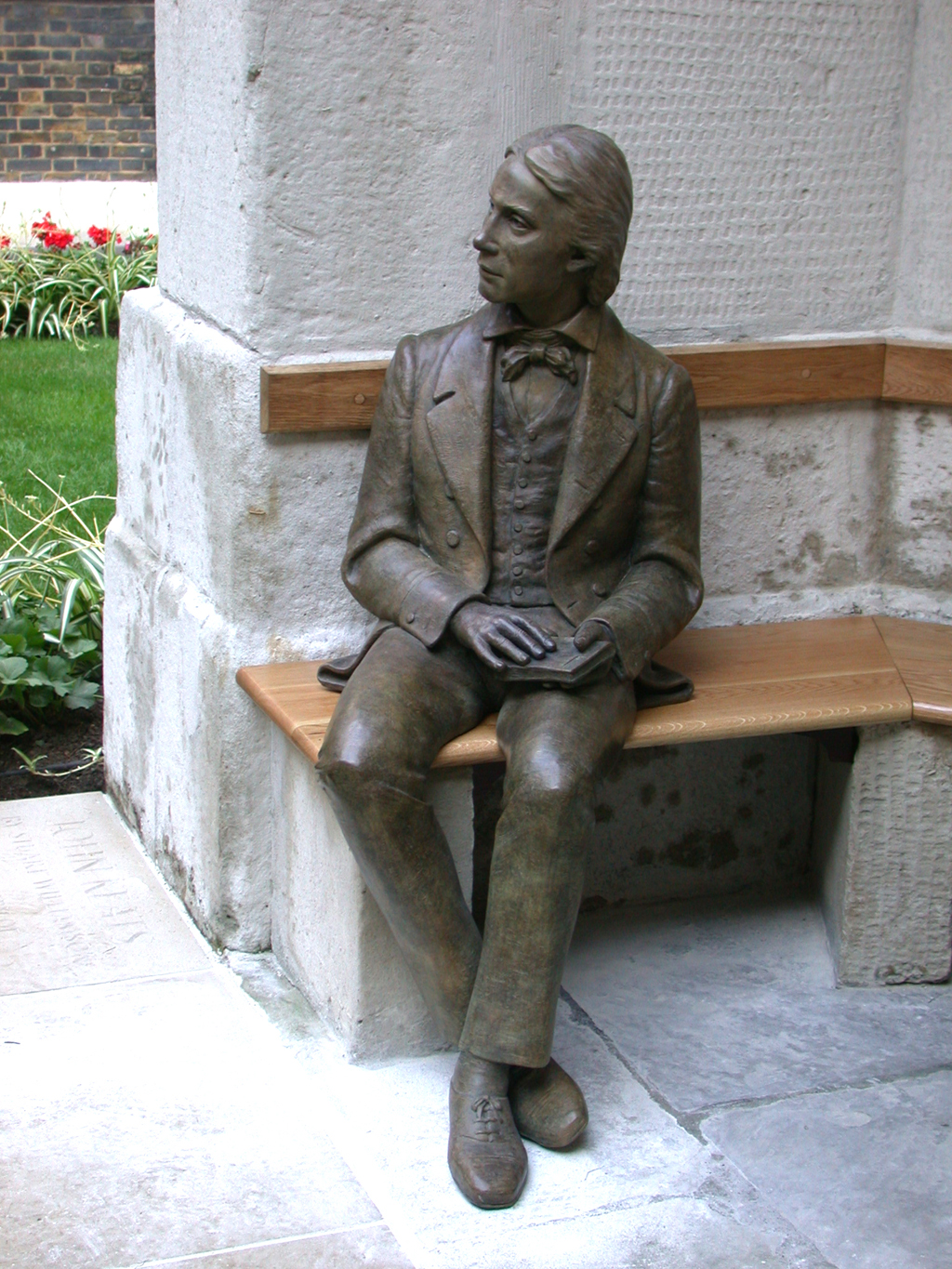
Stuart Williamson bronze of poet John Keats

== Other works ==
Williamson has also created many personal works, including, Pina Bausch (Choreographer) and Bruno Schulz, (Author of 'Street of Crocodiles', Teacher and Artist), has exhibited at the Royal Academy Summer Exhibition, annually at the Society of Portrait Sculptors show, the Mall Galleries and The American Masters Exhibition at the Salmagundi Club in Manhattan, and has exhibited many of his pastel drawings worldwide.

In 2001 Williamson was asked to train a group of Ecuadorian artists in portraiture, molding, wax casting, colouring, and hair insertion for the development of their Historical Museum at the Metropolitan Cultural Center in Quito, Ecuador.

In 2014 Williamson sculpted a twice life-size bust of Professor Kin Yon Tin, who was one of the founders of the Civil Engineering Department at Fudan University, China. The bust was unveiled in Wuhan, China 21 October 2016.

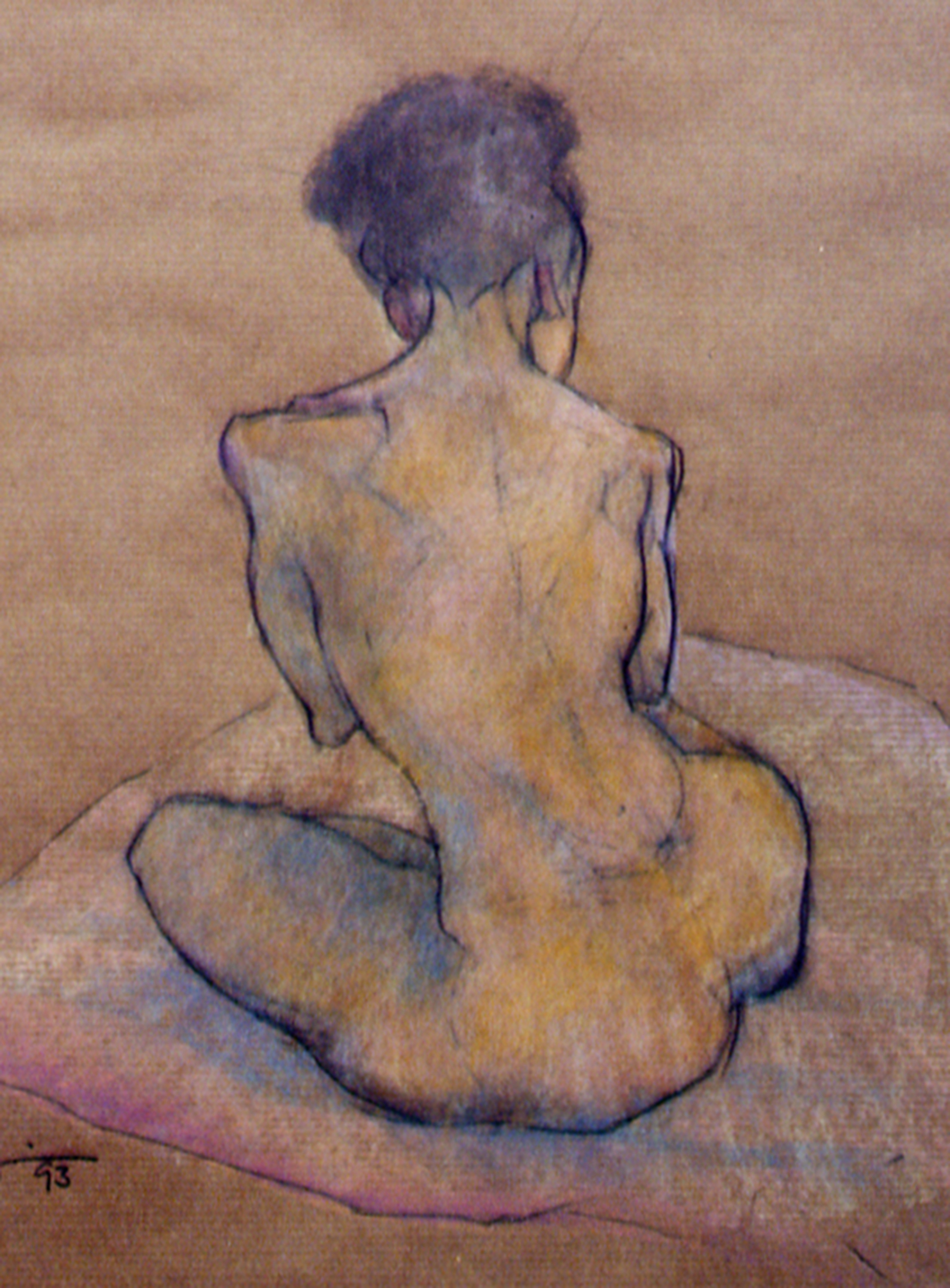
Rebecca pax pastel by Stuart Williamson

== Personal life ==
Stuart Williamson lives and works part-time in both New York City and Ecuador. He is at present devoted to writing poetry.
