= Ian Davenport (artist) =

English artist

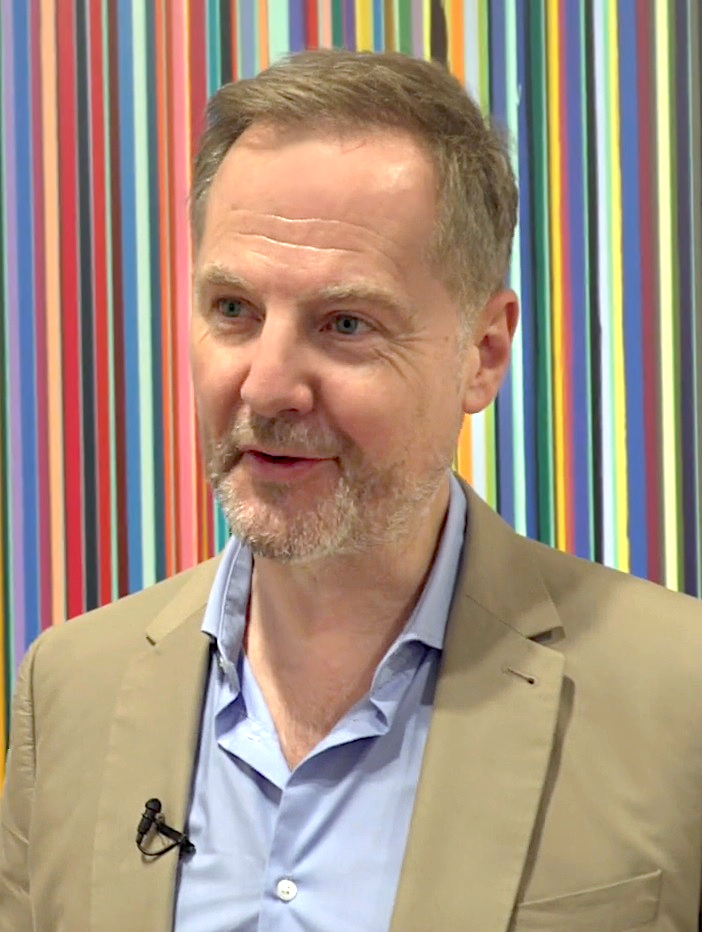
- Davenport (2018)
- Born: 8 July 1966 (age 60); Sidcup, London, England
- Education: Northwich College of Art and Design, Goldsmiths College
- Known for: Painting, Printmaking

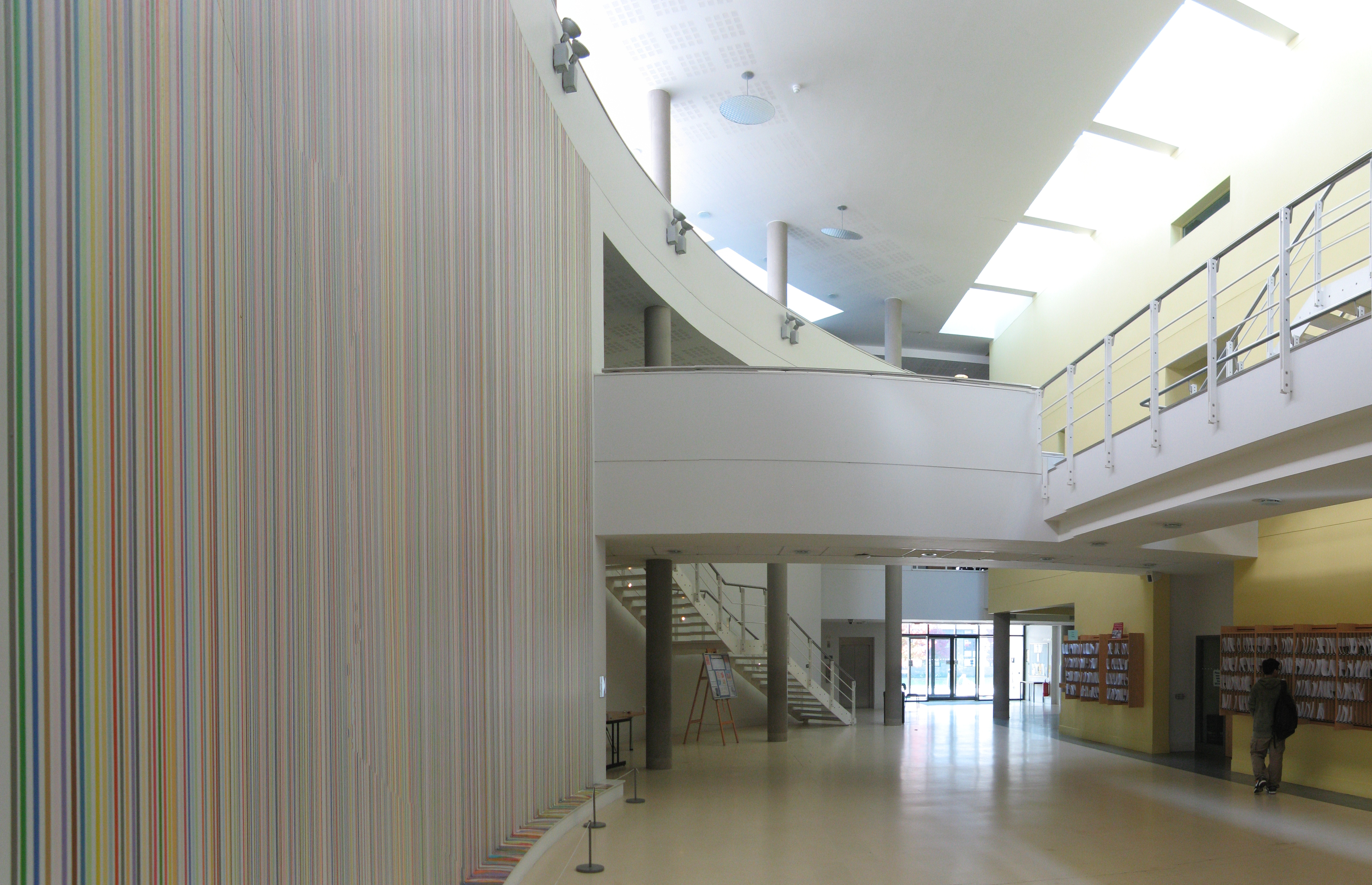
Everything (2004), in the University of Warwick Institute of Mathematics and Statistics foyer

Ian Davenport (born 8 July 1966) is an English abstract painter and former Turner Prize nominee.

== Life and work ==
Ian Davenport was born in Sidcup. He studied art at Northwich College of Art and Design, in Cheshire, and then at Goldsmiths College, from where he graduated in 1988. The same year he exhibited in the Freeze exhibition at Surrey Docks organised by Damien Hirst. In 1990 Davenport's first solo show was held at Waddington Galleries and he was included in the British Art Show. In 1991, he was nominated for the annual Turner Prize. In 1999, he had a solo exhibition at Dundee Contemporary Arts and was a prizewinner at the John Moores exhibition 21 in Liverpool.

Many of his works are made by pouring paint onto a tilted surface and letting gravity spread the paint over the surface. For the Days Like These exhibition at Tate Britain in 2003, he made a thirteen-metre-high mural by dripping lines of differently-coloured paint down the wall from a syringe. His most comprehensive exhibition to date was held at Ikon Gallery in Birmingham in 2004. The same year he was commissioned by the Contemporary Art Society to make a wall painting for the Institute of Mathematics and Statistics at Warwick University.

In September 2006, Davenport unveiled his largest public commission to date in the arches beneath Southwark Bridge, entitled Poured Lines: Southwark. He painted the West End Wall of the University of Oxford Department of Biochemistry.

In 2012, Davenport was commissioned to design an 'Arty Wenlock' for the London Olympics. It was installed on the Thames pathway between the Millennium Bridge and Tate Modern, for the duration of the games.

A monograph on him was published in 2014.

Davenport showed three decades of work in a solo survey exhibition at Dallas Contemporary, Texas, in 2018.

He is a Patron of Paintings in Hospitals, a charity that provides art for health and social care in England, Wales and Northern Ireland.
