= Thackeray (surname) =

Thackeray (/ˈθækəri/ THAK-ər-ee) is an English surname, most notably borne by William Makepeace Thackeray (1811−1863), British novelist, author and illustrator. Other notable people with this surname include the following:

== Thackeray family of India ==
- Thackeray family, an Indian political family
  - Aaditya Thackeray (born 1990), Indian politician
  - Bal Thackeray (1926−2012), Indian politician
  - Prabodhankar Thackeray, penname of Keshav Sitaram Thackeray (1885–1973), Indian social reformer
  - Raj Thackeray (born 1968), Indian politician
  - Rashmi Thackeray, Indian journalist
  - Uddhav Thackeray (born 1960), Indian politician

== Other people with the name ==
- A. David Thackeray (1910–1978), astronomer, after whom Thackeray's Globules in the IC 2944 nebula are named
- Andy Thackeray (born 1968), English footballer
- Anne Isabella Thackeray Ritchie (1837–1919), English writer, the eldest daughter of William Makepeace Thackeray
- Anthony Thackeray (born 1986), English rugby league footballer
- David Thackeray (footballer) (1902-?), Scottish footballer
- Edward Thackeray (1836–1927), recipient of the Victoria Cross
- Francis Thackeray (1793–1842), Church of England clergyman and author
- Francis Thackeray (paleontologist), South African paleontologist and anthropologist
- Fred Thackeray (1877–unknown), English footballer
- Frederick Thackeray (1816–1892), English cricketer and clergyman
- Frederick Rennell Thackeray (1775–1860), senior British Army officer
- George Thackeray (1806–1875), English cricketer
- Henry St. John Thackeray (1869–1930), British bible scholar
- Jim Thackeray (1881–1968), English footballer
- John Richard Thackeray (1772–1846), English clergyman
- Lance Thackeray (1869–1916), English illustrator
- Merv Thackeray (1925–2014), Australian politician
- Michael M. Thackeray (fl. from 1973), South African chemist and battery materials researcher
- Peter Thackeray (born 1950), Kenyan-born English cricketer
- Smita Thackeray (fl. from 1997), Indian social activist and film producer
- St John Thackeray (1778–1824), a British East India Company collector and political agent
- Thomas Thackeray (1693–1760), English clergyman and headmaster

== Fictional characters ==
- Mark Thackeray, a fictional character in the 1967 film To Sir, with Love

== See also ==
- Thackray, a surname
- Thackrey, a surname
- Thackery (disambiguation)
