= Baron Rennell =

Barony in the Peerage of the United Kingdom

Baron Rennell, of Rodd in the County of Hereford, is a title in the Peerage of the United Kingdom. It was created in 1933 for the diplomat Sir Rennell Rodd, previously British Ambassador to Italy. His second but eldest surviving son, the second baron, served as president of the Royal Geographical Society from 1945 to 1948. He had no male issue and was succeeded by his nephew, the third baron. He was the only surviving son of Commander the Hon. Gustaf Guthrie Rennell Rodd, youngest son of the first baron. The third baron was a Scottish international rugby player. As of 2017 the title is held by his son, the fourth baron, who succeeded in 2006.

The first baron was the grandson of Sir John Tremayne Rodd, a vice-admiral in the Royal Navy, and a great-grandson of the geographer, historian and a pioneer of oceanography, James Rennell. The Conservative politician and life peer the Baroness Emmet of Amberley was the eldest daughter of the first baron. Peter Rodd, husband of the writer Nancy Mitford, was the third son of the first baron.

== Barons Rennell (1933) ==
- (James) Rennell Rodd, 1st Baron Rennell (1858–1941)
- Francis James Rennell Rodd, 2nd Baron Rennell (1895–1978)
- John Adrian Tremayne Rodd, 3rd Baron Rennell (1935–2006)
- James Roderick David Tremayne Rodd, 4th Baron Rennell (born 1978)

There is no heir to the barony.

== Arms ==
Coat of arms of Baron Rennell
Crest A representation of the Colossus of Rhodes over the shoulder a bow in the dexter hand an arrow and in the sinister a cup all Proper. Escutcheon Argent two trefoils slipped Sable on a chief of the second three crescents of the first. Supporters On either side a Cornish chough wings elevated and addorsed Proper each charged on the breast with a trefoil slipped Argent. Motto Recte Omnia Duce Deo
