= George Thackeray (book-collector and priest) =

English classical scholar and academic administrator (1777-1850)

- Born: November 1777; Windsor, Berkshire, England
- Died: 21 October 1850 (aged 73); Wimpole Street, London, England
- Burial place: King's College Chapel
- Education: University of Cambridge
- Spouses: Miss Carbonill (m. 1803; died 1810) Mary Ann Cottin (m. 1816; died 1818)
- Children: 1
- Relatives: Frederick Thackeray (brother); William Thackeray (cousin); Thomas Thackeray (grandfather)

George Thackeray, DD, FLS (1777–1850) was a classical scholar and bibliophile, who served as Provost of King's College Cambridge from 1814 until his death. He was born in Windsor and baptised in the parish church there on 23 November 1777. His parents were Frederick Thackeray, a physician, and Elizabeth, née Aldridge. Frederick Rennell Thackeray was one of his brothers, and the novelist William Makepeace Thackeray a cousin. He died at his house in Wimpole Street, London on 21 October 1850, having been ill for some years. He is buried in King's College Chapel.

== Education and career ==
George Thackeray entered Eton as a King's Scholar in 1792, and became a scholar of King's College, Cambridge in 1796, being elected as a fellow in 1800. In 1801 he was appointed as an assistant master at Eton. He received the Cambridge degrees of BA in 1802, MA in 1805, and BD in 1813. He left his post at Eton to become Provost of the King's College on 4 April 1814; on his election to the Provostship he was awarded the degree of DD by royal mandate, as was then customary when a Cambridge graduate attained a post of distinction. As Provost he oversaw major building developments at the college, including the current college library building. He was elected as Vice-Chancellor of the University of Cambridge in 1814 and again in 1830.

Although described in his obituary in the Times as a "most erudite classic" who was said to have greatly improved the university's courses and examinations in his subject, he does not appear to have published anything as an author or editor.

Thackeray was ordained in the Church of England as a deacon on 13 June 1802, and as a priest on 5 June 1803. Both ordinations took place in the Windsor parish church. He held the appointment of chaplain in ordinary to George III, George IV, William IV, and Queen Victoria.

== Personal life ==
Thackeray was married twice, but both of his wives died young. On 9 November 1803 he married a Miss Carbonill, about whom little is currently known; she is thought to have died in 1810. In 1816 he married Mary Ann Cottin; she died on 18 February 1818, five days after giving birth to a daughter, Mary Ann Elizabeth Thackeray. Mary Ann was attended for the birth (at 86 Wimpole Street, her sister's home) by the accoucheur Sir Richard Croft, who had attended Princess Charlotte when she died in childbirth three months earlier (in the so-called "triple obstetrical tragedy"). Croft shot himself in the house while Mary Ann was in labour; it has been speculated (by A. N. L. Munby) that she may have been showing symptoms similar to those that proved fatal in Princess Charlotte's case, though witnesses at the inquest on his death testified that he had been in mental distress ever since the princess's death.

== Book-collecting ==
After Mary Ann's death, Thackeray devoted his leisure to book collecting. At his death he owned 165 black-letter volumes, which he left to the library of King's College. His daughter never married, and left the remainder of his library, about 3200 volumes, to the college on her death in 1879. Thackeray was interested in natural history, especially ornithology; he was a fellow of the Linnean Society, and his library includes many natural history volumes. In 2016 the college received a grant from the United Kingdom Heritage Lottery Fund which enabled the online cataloguing and conservation digitisation of the English literature section of the Thackeray rare book collection.

== Offices ==
Academic offices
Preceded by Humphrey Sumner	Provost of King's College, Cambridge; 1814–1850	Succeeded by Richard Okes
Preceded by William Chafy	Vice-Chancellor of the University of Cambridge; 1814–1815	Succeeded by John Kaye
Preceded by William Chafy	Vice-Chancellor of the University of Cambridge; 1830–1831	Succeeded by John Graham
