= Rennell Rodd, 1st Baron Rennell =

British diplomat, poet, and politician (1858-1941)

The Right Honourable The Lord Rennell GCB GCMG GCVO PC
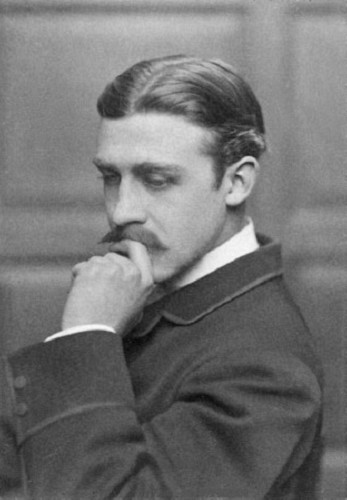
- Rodd, c. 1901

British Ambassador to Italy
- In office 1908–1919
- Monarchs: Edward VII; George V
- Preceded by: Edwin Henry Egerton
- Succeeded by: George Buchanan

Member of Parliament for St Marylebone
- In office 1928–1932
- Preceded by: Douglas McGarel Hogg
- Succeeded by: Alec Cunningham-Reid

Personal details
- Born: James Rennell Rodd; 9 November 1858 London, England
- Died: 26 July 1941 (aged 82)
- Spouse: Lilias Georgina Guthrie (m. 1894)
- Children: 6
- Relatives: John Tremayne Rodd (grandfather); Anthony Todd Thomson (grandfather)
- Education: Balliol College, Oxford

James Rennell Rodd, 1st Baron Rennell, GCB, GCMG, GCVO, PC (9 November 1858 – 26 July 1941), known as Sir Rennell Rodd before 1933, was a British diplomat, poet and politician. He served as British Ambassador to Italy during the First World War.

== Early life ==
Rodd was born in London on 9 November 1858. He was the only son of Cornishman Major James Rennell Rodd (1812–1892) of the Duke of Cornwall's Light Infantry, and his wife Elizabeth Anne Thomson, the third daughter of Dr. Anthony Todd Thomson. His paternal grandparents were Admiral Sir John Tremayne Rodd and the former Jane Rennell, a daughter of the geographer James Rennell.

Rodd was educated at Haileybury and Balliol College, Oxford, where he was associated with the circle of Oscar Wilde. In 1880, he won the Newdigate prize for Raleigh. Wilde later assisted Rodd in securing publication for his first book of verse, Rose Leaf and Apple Leaf, for which Wilde provided an introduction. As Wilde began to court scandal in his public career, their friendship cooled. Following Wilde's trial, Rodd strongly dissociated himself from him, particularly as his own work had contained a number of gently homoerotic verses, such as: "his eyes would gaze from his soul at mine/My eyes that would answer without one sign/And that were enough for love."

== Career ==
Rodd entered the British Diplomatic Service in 1883, and served in minor positions at embassies in Berlin, Rome, Athens and Paris. From 1894 to 1902, Rodd worked under the Consul-General of Egypt, Lord Cromer. He played an important part in negotiating the Anglo-Ethiopian Treaty of 1897 with Emperor Menelik II of Ethiopia. In late 1901, he was appointed first secretary at the embassy in Rome, where he arrived in 1902, and remained for the next two years.

In 1904, Rodd was made minister plenipotentiary to Sweden—and until November 1905, Norway—but did not arrive until 17 January 1905. He played an active and neutral part in the dissolution of the union between Norway and Sweden, for which he was rewarded the Grand Cross of the Order of the Polar Star by King Oscar II. After the secession, he continued as a minister in Sweden until 1908.

In 1908 he was appointed ambassador to Italy. He remained in this post until 1919, and played a key role in securing Italy's adhesion to the Triple Entente. Rodd left the Diplomatic Service in 1919, but nonetheless served on the mission to Egypt in 1920, with Alfred Milner, 1st Viscount Milner. Rodd was the British delegate to the League of Nations from 1921 to 1923. He also sat as Unionist Member of Parliament for the constituency of St Marylebone between 1928 and 1932.

=== Writing career and scholar ===
Apart from his diplomatic services Rodd was also a published poet and scholar of ancient Greece and Rome. In 1920 he delivered the British Academy's Italian Lecture, and in 1928 he visited America where he delivered a lecture on modern Greek folklore to an enraptured H. P. Lovecraft. Earlier in 1927 he met travel writer Richard Halliburton at a party and the two "clicked at once" as Halliburton recounted his time in Greece, including his following in the footsteps of Odysseus and Alexander the Great, deeds which appeared in his recent The Glorious Adventure. He published his memoirs, entitled Social and Diplomatic Memories, in three volumes between 1922 and 1925. His diaries were published in 1981 by Torsten Burgman, and edited by Victor Lal in 2005.

=== Honours ===
Rodd was appointed Companion of the Order of the Bath (CB) in 1897, Knight Commander of the Order of St Michael and St George (KCMG) in 1899, Knight Grand Cross of the Royal Victorian Order (GCVO) in 1905, Knight Grand Cross of the Order of St Michael and St George (GCMG) in 1915, and Knight Grand Cross of the Order of the Bath (GCB) in the 1920 New Year Honours. He was appointed to the Privy Council in 1908 and in 1933 he was raised to the peerage as Baron Rennell, of Rodd in the County of Hereford.

== Personal life ==
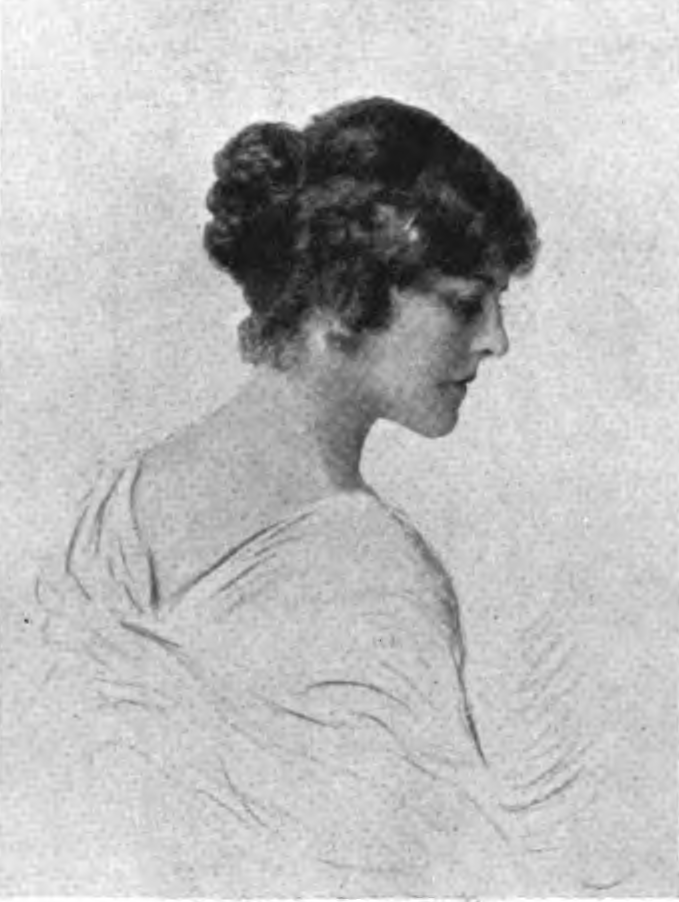
Lilias Georgina Guthrie

On 27 October 1894, Rennell Rodd was married to Lilias Georgina Guthrie (1864–1951) at St George's Hanover Square Church. She was the fourth daughter of James Alexander Guthrie, 4th Baron of Craigie, and the former Elinor Stirling (a daughter of Adm. Sir James Stirling, Governor of Western Australia from 1834 to 1838). Lilias' sister, Rose Ellinor Guthrie, was the wife of Maj.-Gen. The Hon. Sir Cecil Edward Bingham (a younger son of Charles Bingham, 4th Earl of Lucan). They had four sons and two daughters, including:

- Francis James Rennell Rodd, 2nd Baron Rennell (1895–1978), who married the Hon. Mary Constance Vivian Smith, daughter of Vivian Smith, 1st Baron Bicester.
- Hon. Evelyn Violet Elizabeth Rodd (1899–1980), who was a Conservative politician and was created a life peer as Baroness Emmet of Amberley in 1965.
- Hon. Gloria Rodd (1901–1975), who married the painter Simon Elwes
- Hon. Peter Murray Rennell Rodd (1904–1968), who married the author Nancy Mitford, daughter of David Freeman-Mitford, 2nd Baron Redesdale, and one of the famous Mitford sisters.
- Hon. Gustaf Guthrie Rennell Rodd (1905–1974), who married Yvonne Mary Marling, the youngest daughter of diplomat Sir Charles Murray Marling.

Lord Rennell died in July 1941, aged 82. He was succeeded in the barony by his second, but eldest surviving, son Francis, who later served as president of the Royal Geographical Society. His widow died on 20 September 1951.

=== Descendants ===
Though his daughter Gloria, he was a grandfather of four boys, including the portrait painter Dominick Elwes, who had three sons with Tessa Kennedy, including actor Cary Elwes.

== Arms ==
Coat of arms of Rennell Rodd, 1st Baron Rennell
Crest A representation of the Colossus of Rhodes over the shoulder a bow in the dexter hand an arrow and in the sinister a cup all Proper. Escutcheon Argent two trefoils slipped Sable on a chief of the second three crescents of the first. Supporters On either side a Cornish chough wings elevated and addorsed Proper each charged on the breast with a trefoil slipped Argent. Motto Recte Omnia Duce Deo

Diplomatic posts
Preceded by Sir William Barrington	Envoy Extraordinary and Minister Plenipotentiary to the King of Norway; 1904–1905	Succeeded by Sir Arthur Herbert
Preceded by Sir William Barrington	Envoy Extraordinary and Minister Plenipotentiary to the King of Sweden; 1904–1908	Succeeded by Sir Cecil Spring Rice
Preceded by Sir Edwin Egerton	British Ambassador to Italy; 1908–1919	Succeeded by Sir George Buchanan
Parliament of the United Kingdom
Preceded by Douglas Hogg	Member of Parliament for St Marylebone; 1928 – 1932	Succeeded by Alec Cunningham-Reid
Peerage of the United Kingdom
New creation	Baron Rennell; 1933 – 1941	Succeeded by Francis James Rennell Rodd
