= Peter Rodd =

British soldier and aid worker (1904–1968)

The Honourable Peter Rodd
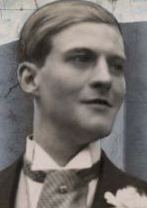
- Peter Rodd, 1933
- Born: Peter Murray Rennell Rodd; 16 April 1904; London, England
- Died: 17 July 1968 (aged 64); Malta
- Education: Wellington College
- Alma mater: Balliol College, Oxford
- Spouse: Nancy Mitford (m. 1933; div. 1957)
- Parent(s): Rennell Rodd, 1st Baron Rennell; Lilias Georgina Guthrie
- Relatives: Francis Rodd, 2nd Baron Rennell (brother); Evelyn Emmet, Baroness Emmet of Amberley (sister)

Hon. Peter Murray Rennell Rodd (16 April 1904 – 17 July 1968) was a British soldier, aid worker and film-maker. He was married to author Nancy Mitford from 1933 to 1957.

== Early life ==
Rodd was born at 17, Stratford Place in London, the second son of Sir Rennell Rodd, a diplomat and politician who was ennobled in 1933 as Baron Rennell, and Lilias Georgina Guthrie (1864–1951). Among his siblings were Francis Rodd, 2nd Baron Rennell (who married the Hon. Mary Constance Vivian Smith), Evelyn Emmet, Baroness Emmet of Amberley (a Conservative politician and was created a life peer), Hon. Gloria Rodd (who married the painter Simon Elwes), and Hon. Gustaf Rodd (who married Yvonne Mary Marling, the youngest daughter of diplomat Sir Charles Murray Marling).

His mother was the fourth daughter of James Alexander Guthrie, 4th Baron of Craigie and the former Elinor Stirling (a daughter of Adm. Sir James Stirling, Governor of Western Australia). His aunt, Rose Ellinor Guthrie, was the wife of Hon. Sir Cecil Edward Bingham (a younger son of Charles Bingham, 4th Earl of Lucan). His father was the only son of Maj. James Rennell Rodd of the Duke of Cornwall's Light Infantry, and the former Elizabeth Anne Thomson (a daughter of Dr. Anthony Todd Thomson). Through his father, he was a descendant of Adm. Sir John Tremayne Rodd and the geographer James Rennell.

He was educated at Wellington College and Balliol College, Oxford.

== Career ==
Rodd followed no specific career and his views were erratic and changeable; having joined the British Union of Fascists in 1933, by the following year he was fiercely denouncing the movement. In 1938 he carried out humanitarian work in Perpignan on behalf of refugees from the Spanish Civil War. He was commissioned into the Welsh Guards in 1939, and during a varied war career saw service in Africa and Italy, attaining the rank of lieutenant-colonel. He was a major in the Welsh Guards reserve of officers, with the honorary rank of lieutenant-colonel, from 1951 until he reached the age limit in 1954. After the war he attempted unsuccessfully to become a film-maker; his one completed project, For Whom the Gate Tolls, shot in Spain, was a failure. Other than this, for the remainder of his years he lived a more or less idle life, mainly on handouts, mostly in Rome and finally in Malta, where he died in 1968.

== Personal life ==
In 1933, Rodd was married to the novelist and socialite Nancy Mitford, daughter of David Freeman-Mitford, 2nd Baron Redesdale and one of the famous Mitford sisters. They divorced in 1957, although by then the marriage had been over in all but name for some years. Nancy, who was called "unabashedly snobbish and devastatingly witty" and her family nicknamed him "Prodd" or "the old toll-gater", from his skill at talking at great length on historical subjects such as turnpike roads.

Rodd died in Malta on 17 July 1968. Nancy died at her home in Versailles, France, in 1973.

== In media ==
Rodd was portrayed by Jamie Blackley in the UKTV series Outrageous (2025).
