= Thackeray (disambiguation) =

William Makepeace Thackeray (1811–1863) was a British novelist, author and illustrator.

Thackeray may also refer to:

- Thackeray (surname), including a list of people and fictional characters with the name
  - Henry St. John Thackeray (1860–1930) a British biblical scholar at King's College, Cambridge, expert on Koine Greek, Josephus and the Septuagint
  - A. David Thackeray (19 June 1910 – 21 February 1978), an astronomer trained at Cambridge University, served as director of the Radcliffe Observatory for 23 years
  - David Thackeray (born 16 November 1902) a Scottish footballer, played as a left half for Alloa Athletic, Motherwell and Portsmouth
  - Bal Thackeray (1926–2012), Indian politician
    - Thackeray family, Indian political family
    - Thackeray (film), a 2019 Indian biopic about Bal Thackeray
- Thackeray, Saskatchewan, a place in Canada
- SS Thackeray, a ship, launched as SS Empire Aldgate

== See also ==
- Thackray, a surname
- Thackrey, a surname
- Thackery (disambiguation)
- Thackeray's Globules, a group of stars in the IC 2944 nebula
- Thackeray Hall, an academic building of the University of Pittsburgh
