= Church View and Church Cottages =

Buildings in the London Borough of Barnet, England

Coordinates: 51°39′41″N 0°11′40″W

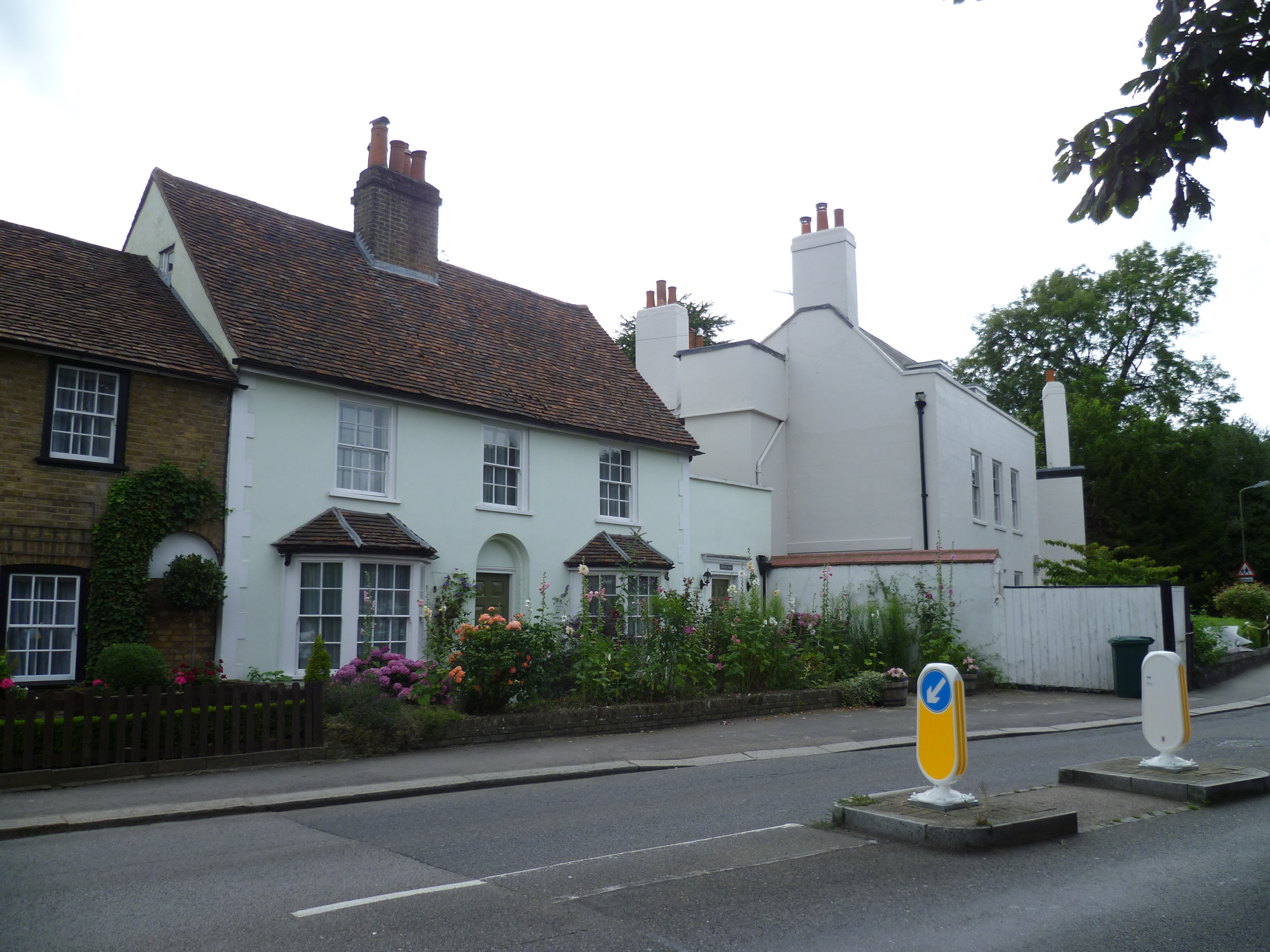
Church View (centre). (White Lodge on the far right)

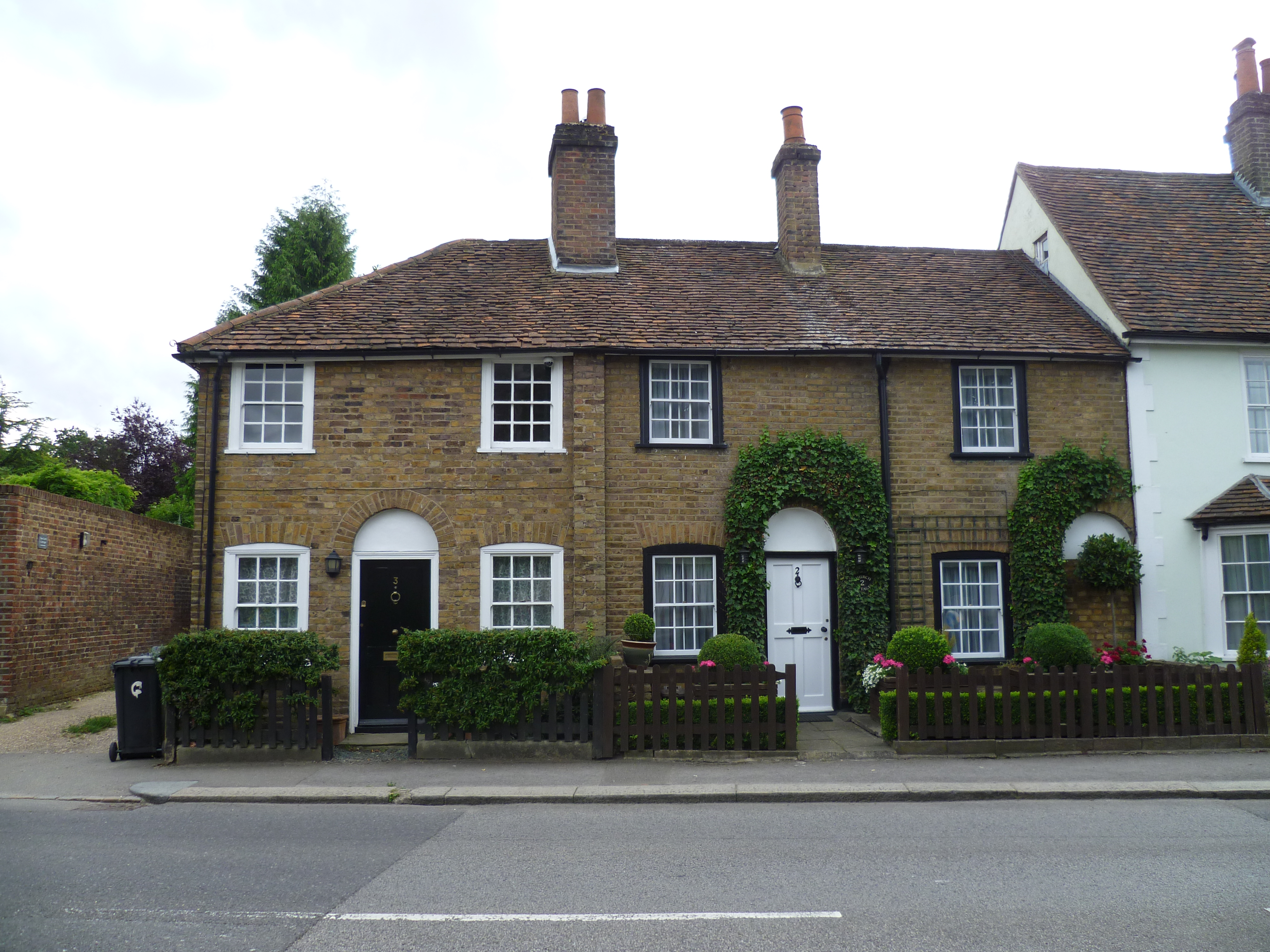
Church Cottages

Church View and Church Cottages are grade II listed buildings in Hadley Green Road, Monken Hadley, to the north of Chipping Barnet, London Borough of Barnet, England. They face directly on to St Mary the Virgin church, hence the name. Church View dates from the late 17th or early 18th centuries while the three adjacent terraced Church Cottages were built in the mid 19th century.
