= Tremayne Rodd, 3rd Baron Rennell =

Scottish rugby union player and Conservative peer

The Right Honourable The Lord Rennell
- Born: John Adrian Tremayne Rodd; 28 June 1935; England
- Died: 9 December 2006 (aged 71); London
- Education: Downside School
- Title: 3rd Baron Rennell
- Spouse: Phyllis Caroline Neill (m. 1977)

John Adrian Tremayne Rodd, 3rd Baron Rennell (28 June 1935 – 9 December 2006) was a British naval officer, Scottish rugby union player and businessman. He succeeded his uncle as 3rd Baron Rennell in 1978, and sat on the Conservative Party benches in the House of Lords.

== Early years ==
John Adrian Tremayne Rodd was the younger son of Gustaf Guthrie Rennell Rodd, a Commander in the Royal Navy, and his wife, the former Yvonne Mary Marling, a singing teacher and co-author of Singing, the Physical Nature of the Vocal Organ. His elder brother (by two years), Saul David Rennell Rodd, predeceased him. His father was the younger son of the diplomat and Conservative MP Sir Rennell Rodd, who was created Baron Rennell in 1933. His father's elder brother was 2nd Baron Rennell. His uncles and aunts also included the life peer the Baroness Emmet of Amberley, and, through marriage, the artist Simon Elwes and Nancy Mitford. Rodd was evacuated to the United States during the Second World War. On his return, he was educated at Ladycross School and Downside School.

== Royal Navy ==
He followed his father in joining the Royal Navy in 1952, and joined Britannia Royal Naval College in Dartmouth. He later served in the Home Fleet, the Mediterranean Fleet and the Far East Fleet. He was the boxing champion of the Home Fleet in 1958, and played rugby for Royal Navy, Combined Services and United Services teams.

== Rugby ==
As Tremayne Rodd, he won 14 caps as a scrum-half for Scotland between 1958 and 1965, battling for his place with Stan Coughtrie and Alex Hastie. He was a member of the Scottish team that shared the Five Nations with Wales in 1964. He also played for the Barbarians. He played most of his rugby in England, for London Scottish, Plymouth, and the Hampshire county team. In the 1960s he was a key player in the London Scottish rugby sevens team, winning the Middlesex Sevens tournament five times from 1960 to 1965. He started to scale back his rugby-playing activities in 1965 and his amateur rugby career was ended by a ban for working as a freelance journalist on a British Lions tour in 1966, writing for The Observer and The Scotsman, which led to a ruling by the International Rugby Board that he had become a professional.

== Later years ==
Rodd left the Royal Navy in 1962 with the rank of lieutenant. Until 1966, he worked as a merchant banker at Morgan Grenfell, where his uncle, the 2nd Baron Rennell, was a director. After leaving Morgan Grenfell, he became a director of Marks of Distinction, a company that created sporting medals and trophies and put on sporting and corporate promotional events. He left to run his own trophy and sporting promotions company, Tremayne Limited, from 1978 to 1984. In 1974, at the funeral of his cousin Dominic Elwes who had committed suicide, after a sententious speech by John Aspinall, Rennell infamously "went up and gave Aspinall the most useful punch in the face you have ever seen." He succeeded his uncle as 3rd Baron Rennell in 1978, and took the Conservative whip in the House of Lords. Rodd actively participated in many sports including; rugby for several Parliamentary teams, cricket, golf, bridge, backgammon and chess. In 2000 he was the team leader for Vladimir Kramnik in London when he won the World Chess Championship from Garry Kasparov. He also played in several backgammon world championships.

In 1977 he married Phyllis Neill. The marriage produced a son and three daughters. Rodd died of cancer in London, aged 71. Upon his death the title passed to his son, James Rodd, 4th Baron Rennell.

== Arms ==
Coat of arms of Tremayne Rodd, 3rd Baron Rennell
Crest A representation of the Colossus of Rhodes over the shoulder a bow in the dexter hand an arrow and in the sinister a cup all Proper. Escutcheon Argent two trefoils slipped Sable on a chief of the second three crescents of the first. Supporters On either side a Cornish chough wings elevated and addorsed Proper each charged on the breast with a trefoil slipped Argent. Motto Recte Omnia Duce Deo

== Links ==
- Obituary, The Independent, 23 December 2007
- Obituary, The Times, 3 January 2007
- Obituary, The Daily Telegraph, 13 January 2007
- scrum.com statistics

Peerage of the United Kingdom
Preceded by Francis Rodd	Baron Rennell; 1978–2006	Succeeded by James Rodd
