= Francis Rodd, 2nd Baron Rennell =

British Army general (1895–1978)

Major-General The Right Honourable The Lord Rennell KBE CB DL JP FRGS
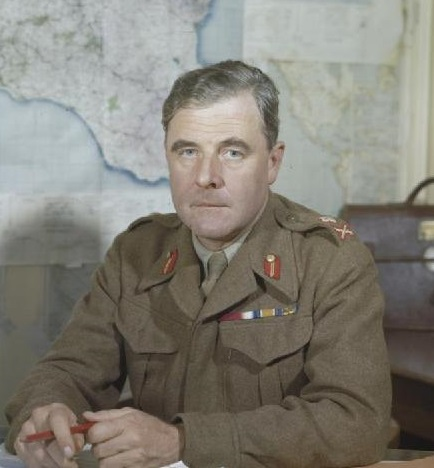
- Rennell at his desk as the staff officer of the Allied Military Government in Sicily in 1943
- Born: 25 October 1895
- Died: 15 March 1978 (aged 82)
- Burial place: Presteigne Cemetery, Wales
- Education: Balliol College, Oxford
- Spouse: Hon. Mary Constance Vivian Smith
- Military career
- Allegiance: United Kingdom
- Branch: British Army
- Rank: Major-General
- Conflicts: First World War; Second World War
- Awards: Knight Commander of the Order of the British Empire; Companion of the Order of the Bath; Mentioned in Despatches; Order of Saints Maurice and Lazarus (Italy)

Major-General Francis James Rennell Rodd, 2nd Baron Rennell, KBE, CB, DL, JP, FRGS (25 October 1895 – 15 March 1978), known as Lord Rennell, was an army officer and the second but eldest surviving son of the diplomat Rennell Rodd, 1st Baron Rennell. He served as a Chief of Civil Affairs in the Mediterranean theatre of war from 1941 to 1944.

== Career ==
Rodd was educated at Eton College and Balliol College, Oxford where he graduated with a Master of Arts.

=== First World War and diplomatic service ===
During the First World War he served in the artillery and, since he spoke four languages fluently, as an intelligence officer in France, Italy, North Africa, Egypt, Libya, Palestine and Syria. While an intelligence officer in Egypt and Palestine, he befriended T. E. Lawrence triggering his passion for exploring desert landscapes. He wrote of Lawrence:

There are few people in this wide world I have greater admiration for... and I like him very well besides...

Rodd entered HM Diplomatic Service in 1919. He was able to help his friend in 1919 when the latter was seriously injured in an air accident after the Handley Page Type O Bi-plane bomber he was traveling in crashed at Roma-Centrocelle airport. Both pilots were killed but Lawrence miraculously escaped with a broken shoulder blade and two broken ribs. Having served as a diplomat in Rome, Rodd was able to arrange for Lawrence to recover at his father's residence in the British Embassy there.

=== Bank of England and post-War career ===
After the war, and while still working at the Foreign Office, Rodd travelled in the Aïr mountains of the southern Sahara desert (1922–3), and wrote about his findings in People of the Veil, work that won the praise of the Royal Geographical Society. After this expedition Rodd tried his hand in the civil service. Not feeling rewarded in that line of work, Rodd resigned from the service in 1924 and joined the Bank of England. A second journey in 1927, with his brother Peter, and the future Arctic explorer Augustine Courtauld resulted in his being awarded the Society's Cuthbert Peake Grant and Founders' Medal in 1929. That same year he was sent to Rome by the Governor of the bank, Sir Montague Norman, to address some problems at the British-Italian Bank and as a result Rodd had a number of personal interviews with Benito Mussolini. In November 1934, Montague then asked Rodd to offer his friend, Colonel Lawrence, the appointment of Secretary to the bank. In a letter to Rodd, Lawrence politely declined the offer:

Dear F.R.,... That enclosed message ought to have been instantly dealt with, by a plain 'Yes' or 'No'. Will you please say 'No', for me, but not a plain 'No'. Make it a coloured 'No', for the Elizabethan of Herbert Baker's naming had given me a moment of very rare pleasure which I shall not tell to anyone, nor forget. Please explain how by accident it only came to me tonight, when I got back from work, too late to catch the evening mail from this pretty seaboard town. These newspaper praises lead a fellow to write himself down as a proper fraud – and then along comes a real man to stake himself on the contrary opinion. It is heartening and I am more than grateful. There – please work all that into your 'No': explain that I have a chance (if only I have the guts to take it) of the next year possessing all my time. Yours ever, T. E. Shaw

After leaving the Bank of England, Rodd joined Morgan, Grenfell & Co. where he became a managing director. He was also a partner in Buckmaster & Moore resigning in 1929.

== Second World War ==
In 1939 Rodd was re-commissioned into the army and served as Chief of Civil Affairs, Staff Officer of the Allied Military Government in Sicily, and as Major General, Civil Affairs Administration Middle East Command, East Africa Command, and Italy.

For nearly a year from July 1939, Rodd worked for the Ministry of Economic Warfare – an organization that he played a role in creating. He resigned from the Ministry on 3 June 1940 in order to take up a commission in the Army. During the Second world War he participated in the Allied invasion of Sicily in 1943, after which he served as a major-general in colonial administration in the Middle East, East Africa and Italy. The setting up civilian and military authorities in occupied countries caused opponents to accuse the Allies of corruption. When the Allied Military Government of Occupied Territory was merged with the Allied Control Commission, it was suggested that Rodd was being too sympathetic to the Italians. However, because he was dealing with territories where nearly every official was part of the Fascist movement, he felt it necessary to keep a number of them in office to maintain control. After he employed the Carabinieri in Sicily to counter a growing Mafia he received more scrutiny. In one of his reports, Rodd defended his actions, stating:

The other element which may be of considerable importance is the Mafia. This organisation is less a secret society than an attitude of mind which no Italian Government has yet succeeded in stamping out completely, though Mussolini made a strenuous effort to do so when he sent Mori as Prefect to Palermo in the 1925–30 period... There is some evidence of Mafia activity increasing. There has been one murder of a land owner which looks like Mafia work. The aftermath of war and the breakdown of central and provincial authority provide a good culture ground for the virus. The only formation capable of dealing with the Mafia with proper support is the Corps of Carabinieri. These with Civil Affairs Police Officers and military patrols may be able to check on... activity. I say deliberately "may", because with the Omertà, or Sicilian code of honour, which precludes recourse of the injured parties even in cases of murder to the Government, it has been notoriously difficult to secure evidence of guilt, or even willingness to make charges...

In another report Rodd noted the growth of a number of violent Communist groups:

Instances in point are the riots that took place at Irsina... and at a village in Matera Province. In both cases the mob invaded the Municipal Offices and lynched the Communal Secretary, who in both cases was an ardent Fascist. One Carabinieri's throat was also cut. In one of these two cases the mob also attacked and injured, but not fatally, the wife and family of the Communal Secretary. These instances have been accompanied by brutality and mutilation. There have been one or two other cases in areas further North where similar incidents might have taken place but for the intervention of my officers arriving with the troops and calming the crowd...

While in Italy he pursued the Allies' goal of protecting physical symbols of the country; i.e. works of art, buildings, libraries and monuments. All of which he had come to appreciate during his childhood in Rome both during the time his father was ambassador and while he was a diplomat there in the 1920s.

=== Post-Second World War career ===
After the war he served as president of the Royal Geographical Society 1945–1948 and played a significant role in putting the Society on a secure financial footing. He was also elected to the board of British Overseas Airways Corporation (BOAC) 1954–1965. On the death of his father on 26 July 1941 he gained the title of 2nd Baron Rennell and become active as a Liberal peer, crossing to the Conservative benches in the early 1950s. He also served as a Deputy Lieutenant and later Vice-Lieutenant of Herefordshire.

== Personal life ==
Baron Rennell died on 16 March 1978 and was buried in Presteigne cemetery in Wales. At the top of his gravestone, designed by David Kindersley, there is an image of the 'Agadez cross'. This is a prominent Tuareg image which, according to Rodd, most likely originated with the 'Ankh', an Egyptian hieroglyphic symbol. Further down there is a Tamasheq word written in traditional Tifinagh script (ⵏⵏⵆⵔⵗⵙ). Pronounced Al-khar-ghas, this remains a greeting, meaning something like 'Peace to you'. Rodd translated it as 'Naught but good'.

Rodd married Mary Constance Vivian Smith, daughter of Vivian Hugh Smith, 1st Baron Bicester and Lady Sybil Mary McDonnell (daughter of William McDonnell, 6th Earl of Antrim), on 3 August 1928. Together, they had issue:

- Hon. Joanna Phoebe Rodd (1929–2016) married Comte Gerard de Renusson d'Hauteville
- Hon. Juliet Honor Rodd (1930–2023) married Brian Boobbyer
- Hon. Mary Elizabeth Jill Rodd (1932–2020) married firstly Michael Dunne (1928–2020); married secondly Christopher Bridges Daniell.
- Hon. Rachel Georgiana Rodd (1935– 2017) married Richard Douglas Blythe.

Rodd was passionate about exploration and geography.

== Works ==
- Rodd, Francis. (1932) General William Eaton;: The Failure of an Idea, Minton, Balch and company.
- Rodd, Francis. (1926) People of the veil. Being an account of the habits, organisation and history of the wandering Tuareg tribes which inhabit the mountains of Air or Asben in the Central Sahara, London, MacMillan & Co.
- Rodd, Francis. (1970) British Military Administration of Occupied Territories in Africa during the Years 1941–1947, Greenwood Press.

== Arms ==
Coat of arms of Francis Rodd, 2nd Baron Rennell
Crest A representation of the Colossus of Rhodes over the shoulder a bow in the dexter hand an arrow and in the sinister a cup all Proper. Escutcheon Argent two trefoils slipped Sable on a chief of the second three crescents of the first. Supporters On either side a Cornish chough wings elevated and addorsed Proper each charged on the breast with a trefoil slipped Argent. Motto Recte Omnia Duce Deo

Peerage of the United Kingdom
Preceded by James Rodd	Baron Rennell; 1941–1978	Succeeded by Tremayne Rodd
