= St Mary the Virgin, Monken Hadley =

Church in the London Borough of Barnet, England

Coordinates: 51.6616°N 0.1939°W

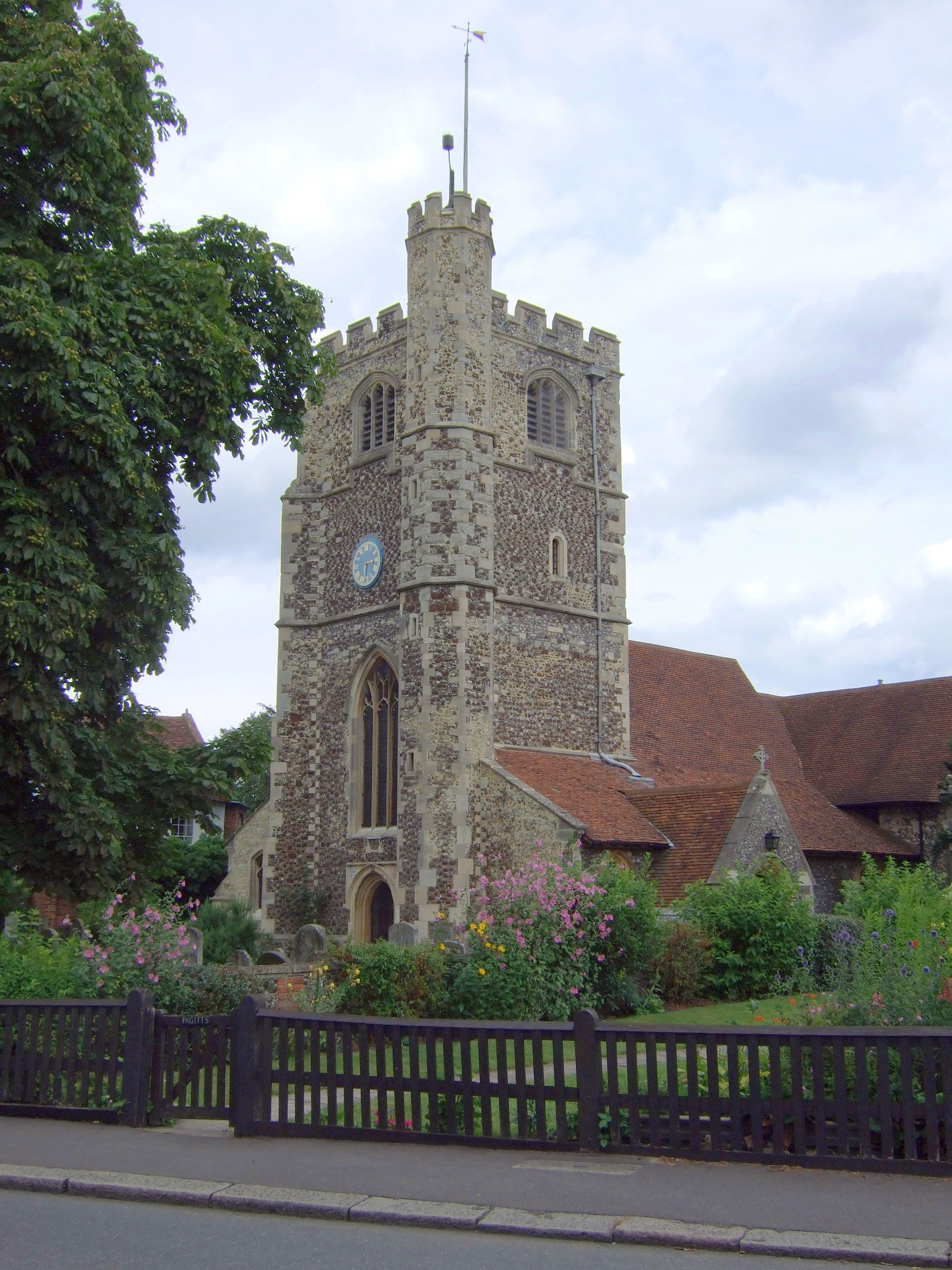
- St Mary's Church
- St Mary the Virgin, Monken Hadley
- Country: England
- Denomination: Church of England
- Website: www.monkenhadley.church

Architecture
- Heritage designation: Grade II*
- Style: English Gothic
- Completed: 1494

Administration
- Diocese: London
- Archdeaconry: Hampstead
- Deanery: Barnet
- Parish: St Mary the Virgin, Monken Hadley

Clergy
- Rector: The Reverend Francesco Aresco

St Mary the Virgin is the parish church of Monken Hadley. It is located in the Diocese of London and markets itself as "The Beacon Church" after the medieval beacon on its tower. That beacon has become a symbol of the local area, and forms the badge of the nearby Church of England primary school.

The church remains a focus of eucharistic worship within the surrounding district and maintains a strong choral tradition. Its tower bells are in good order and regularly rung, eight being hung for change ringing, and the ninth as a sanctus bell

== History ==
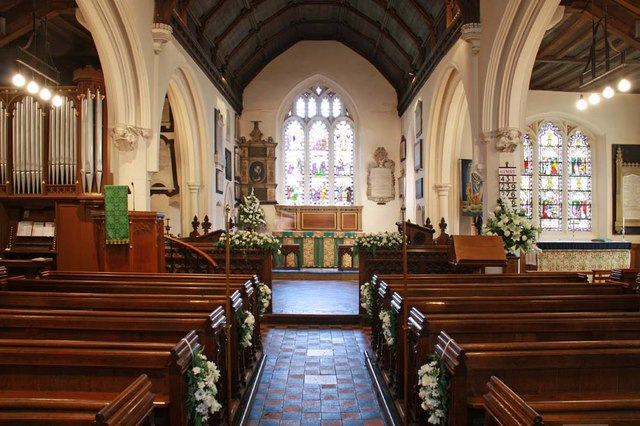
Interior of St Mary's Church

A church is believed to have stood on the site for over 800 years. The church was rebuilt in its present Perpendicular style form in 1494 (the date being carved in stone between a wing and a rose over the west door (Note: However, it appears as "1393" to the untutored eye since - as explained in an 1827 account of the church - the second and fourth numerals are both a half-eight "often used in ancient inscriptions")) possibly after incurring damage during the battle of Barnet in 1471. (Note: The 1827 account advanced a hypothesis or legend that it had been built by Edward IV as a chapel for religious service, to the memory of those who fell in the 1471 battle, a theory backed by no surviving medieval documents.) It included two side chapels (in transepts) dedicated to St Anne and St Catherine.

The square flint tower of the church at the west end has quoins of freestone and contains six large bells (three from the early 18th century and three from the late 19th century) and three smaller ones. At the top of the tower, at the south-west, there is a copper signal beacon (known in the 1827 description as "The unique vestige of the Middle Ages ... a firepan, or pitchpot"), part of an ancient series of signal beacons and possibly also used to guide people across Enfield Chase. The medieval beacon was blown down in January 1779 and carefully repaired despite the need for signal beacons having passed by then.

The font is late 15th century with a modern cover. There is a well-preserved monument by Nicholas Stone to Sir Roger Wilbraham (died 1616), Solicitor-General for Ireland, his wife Mary Baber and their three daughters. An 1827 account of the church stated it was "a handsome structure, built at different periods. The chancel bears marks of great antiquity, but the body has been built with bricks". At that time the north transept window still had surviving remains of painted glass,

"among which may be noticed the rebus of the Gooders, a family of considerable consequence at Hadley in the fifteenth and sixteenth centuries. This consists of a partridge with an ear of wheat in its bill; on an annexed scroll is the word Gooder; on the capital of one of the pillars are two partridges with ears of corn in the mouth, an evident repetition of the same punning device, and it is probable the Gooders were considerable benefactors towards building the church".

The parish and church were heavily influenced by Tractarianism and the Oxford Movement, with the latter heavily renovated in 1848 by the architect G. E. Street, removing the pulpit, galleries and plastered ceiling, repointing the stonework and moving the aisle walls about 18 inches outwards. The south porch was rebuilt in 1855 and later Victorian additions were an organ (in the former chapel of St Anne to the north of the chancel), a new pulpit and new stained glass in all the windows.

A new vestry was also added north of the chancel in 1888. In the late 19th century the parish organist was W.R. Driffill. In 1904 the church became the model for another Church of Saint Mary the Virgin in Chappaqua, New York, United States. The original church has been grade II* listed since 1949. The east window and other stained glass was destroyed in the Blitz and the side chapel of St Catherine was restored in 1958, still being in use for that purpose.

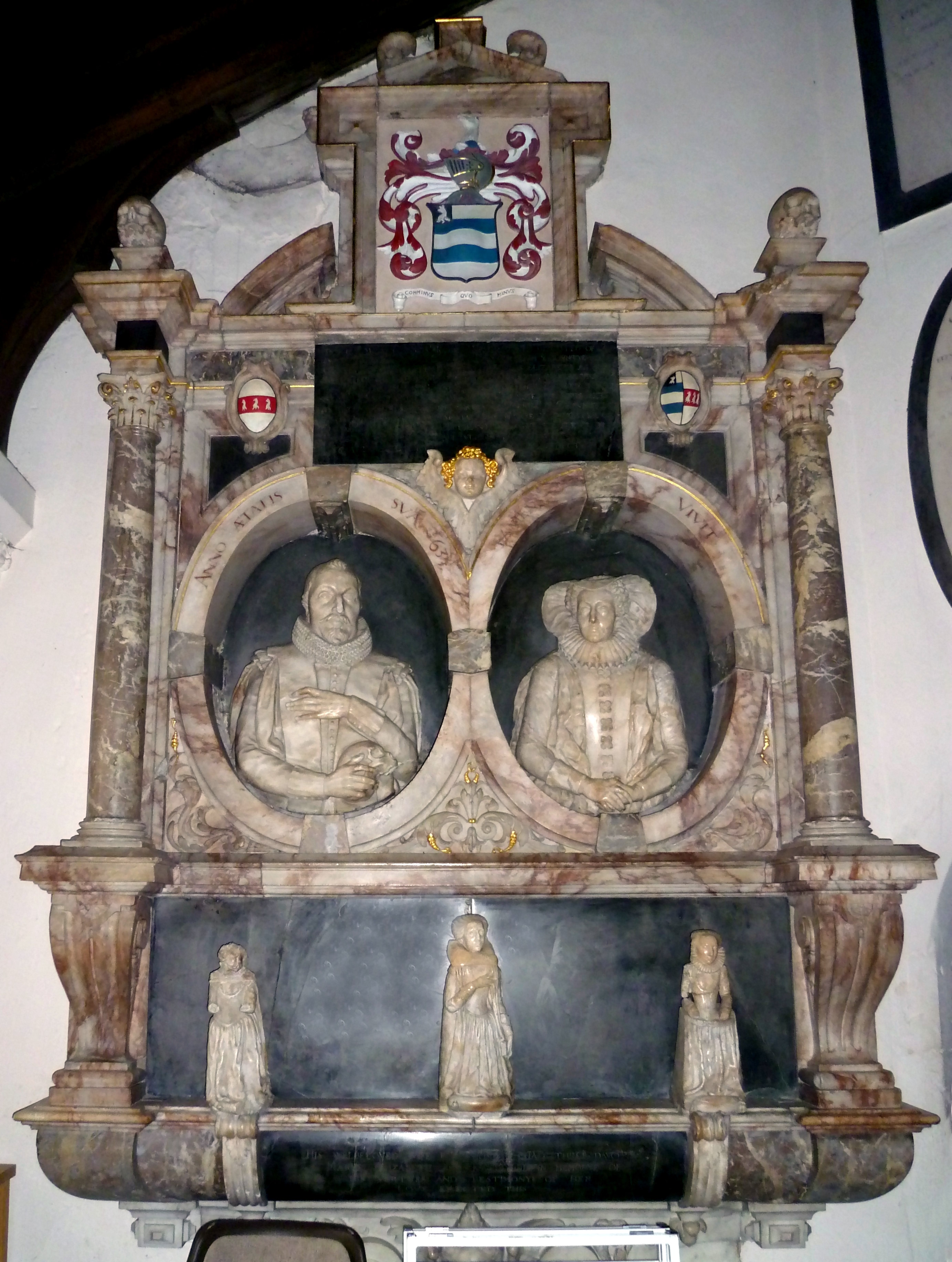
Monument to Sir Roger Wilbraham, who died in 1616 and his wife Mary.

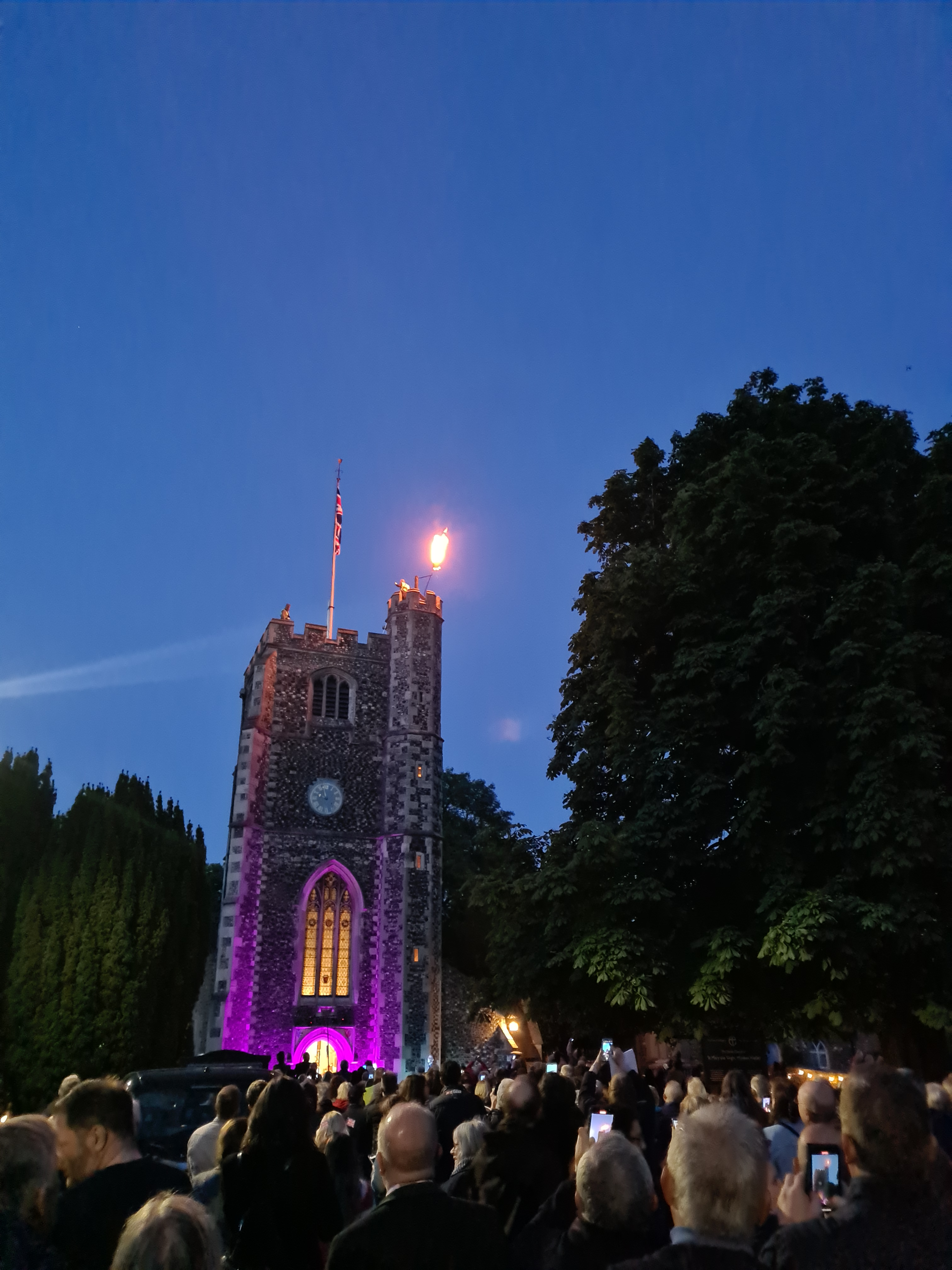
The beacon lit in 2022 for the Platinum Jubilee of HM Queen Elizabeth II.

== Brasses and monuments ==
=== Brasses ===
- Philip and Margaret Green and Margaret Somercotes, 1442, moved in from an earlier building
- Walter and Agnes Tornor or Turner, 1494
- William and Joanna Turnour or Turner, 1500
- John Goodere (d.1504)
- Thomas Goodere and his wife, 1518
- William Gale and his family, 1614

=== Wall and floor monuments ===
- Philip and Elizabeth Grene, the former being the son of Walter Grene
- Anne Walkeden
- Sir Roger Wilbraham
- Elizabeth Davies (d. 1678), daughter of Sir Thomas Wilbraham and widow of Mutton Davies, by William Stanton
- Alice Stamford (c.1507-1573), wife of William Stanford and then of Roger Carew, and Henry Carew, her only son by her second marriage, featuring a painted portrait of Henry - chancel
- John Walker, Hereditary Usher of the Exchequer (1640-1703) and his wife Cecill (c.1664-1736)
- Anna (c.1675 - 1727), daughter of Henry Hitch of Leathley and wife of Richard Wynne
- Ince family
  - Piggot Ince (1720-1765), his wife Mary (1721-1768) and their children Barbara Ansilla (1755-1756) and Mary Elizabeth (1752-1766)
  - Piggot's son James Piggott Ince (17501-1829), his wife Anna Maria (1757-1830) and their children Harriett (1784-1809), Charles (d.1850), Edward (d.1840), Ralph Piggott (1800-1871), Lydia (d.1863), Catherine Anne (d.1865) and William (1781-1818)
  - James Piggott's son James Berkeley (1777-1845)
- James Berkeley (1706-1767) and his wife Mary (1718-1768)
- 1st and 2nd Smith baronets
- Sir Culling Smith's
  - mother's mother Ann Horne
  - mother's brother John Horne, Governor of Bombay
  - father's parents Thomas and Ann Smith
  - brothers Thomas, John and Charles
  - sister Ann
  - wife Mary
  - eldest daughter Maria
  - parents Thomas and Culling Smith
- Pennant family
  - Sarah Pennant (d.1780)
  - Catharine Pennant (d. 1797), niece of the curate John Pennant and youngest daughter of David Pennant of Flintshire, by Richard Westmacott the Younger
- Hugh (1848-1854) and Francis (1850-1854), sons of William Wyke Smith and his wife Catherine
- John Bonus Child (1764-1832) and his wife Frances (1782-1855)
- Rectors of the church and their families:
  - John Richard Thackeray (1772-1846), his wife Marianne (1783-1855)
  - John Burrows (1732-1786), his wife Maria (d.1791), his sister Ann (d.1811) and his daughter Frances (1773-1860)
  - Charles Jeffreys Cottrell (c.1739-1819), his wife Fanny (c.1749-1811), their fifth son Frederick (1780-1811 (Note: Cenotaph)), their fourth daughter (c.1781-1818) Anna Frederica, their second son John (.c1768-1796), their eldest son Charles (c.1766-1829) and their third son Clement (c.1772-1814), Rector of North Waltham
- Richard Poston (1660-1723) and his wife Mary (1660-1742)
- Moore family
  - Richmond Moore (1775-1796)
  - Macartney (c.1788-1831) and his wife Henrietta (nee Halhed; c.1801-1837)
  - Maria Sarah (c.1781-1842)
- Barroneau family
  - Francis (c.1742-1812) and his wives Margaret (c.1748-1793) and Elizabeth (c.1768-1846)
- Frederick Cass (1787-1861), and his son Frederick Charles Cass, Rector and historian of the parish
- Thomas Windus of Gothic Hall, Stamford Hill, raised by his uncle Peter Moore, MP, lord of the manor of Hadley
- Joseph Henry Green
- Ann (c.1758-1848), widow of Samuel Harman, and their children George (c.1792-1826), St. John (c.1795-1814) and Ann (c.1782-1861)
- James Quilter (c.1754-1818), his wife Mary Anne (c.1761-1818) and their children Emma Cecilia (c.1795-1864), Jemima (c.1786-1870), James (c.1784-1864) and Henry Sampson (c.1790-1823)
- Francis Rix (c.1779-1841), previously of St Neots
- Alexander Dury (c.1757-1843), his wife Lucy Maria (c.1764-1805) and their children Thomas (c.1787-1803), Francis (c.1795-1813) and Isabella (d.1855)
- John Randell (c.1805-1856)
- Charles Tempest-Hicks (1888-1918)

== See also ==
- Church View and Church Cottages
