= Fred Thackeray =

English footballer

Personal information
- Full name: Fred Thackeray
- Date of birth: 1877
- Place of birth: Sheffield, England
- Position: Full back

Senior career*
Years	Team	Apps	(Gls)
1897–1900	Montrose Works		
1900–1904	The Wednesday	9	(0)
1904–1905	Gainsborough Trinity	11	(0)
1905–1909	Rotherham County		
1909	Eccles Borough		
Total		20	(0)
- * Club domestic league appearances and goals

Fred Thackeray (1877–unknown) was an English footballer who played in the Football League for Gainsborough Trinity and The Wednesday.
