= George Thackeray (cricketer and priest) =

English cricketer

Personal information
- Full name: George Thackeray
- Born: 22 July 1806; Bath, Somerset
- Died: 9 October 1875 (aged 69); Hemingby, Lincolnshire

Domestic team information
- Years: Team
- 1826: Cambridge University
- Source: CricketArchive, 23 June 2013

George Thackeray (22 July 1806 – 9 October 1875) was an English cricketer with amateur status.

Thackeray was educated at Eton and King's College, Cambridge. He is recorded as playing in one match for Cambridge University Cricket Club in 1826, totalling 5 runs with a highest score of 5 and holding no catches. He graduated BA in 1830, having already become a fellow of the college in 1829. He continued as a fellow until 1841, during which he was ordained as a Church of England priest in 1833. He was rector of Hemingby, Lincolnshire, 1840–75.

== Bibliography ==
- Haygarth, Arthur (1996) [1862]. Scores & Biographies, Volume 1 (1744–1826). Kennington: Frederick Lillywhite. ISBN 978-19-00592-23-9.
- Haygarth, Arthur (1997) [1862]. Scores & Biographies, Volume 2 (1827–1840). Kennington: Frederick Lillywhite. ISBN 978-19-00592-23-9.
