= Edward Thackeray =

Sir Edward Talbot Thackeray
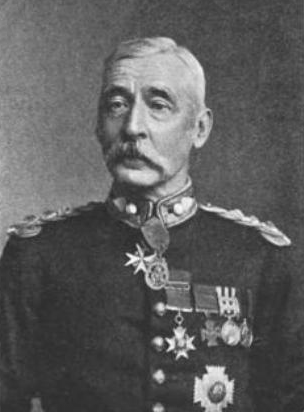
- Born: 19 October 1836; Broxbourne, Hertfordshire, England
- Died: 3 September 1927 (aged 90); Garessio, Italy
- Burial place: The English Cemetery, Bordighera
- Relatives: William Makepeace Thackeray (1st cousin)
- Military career
- Allegiance: United Kingdom
- Branch: Bengal Army; British Army
- Rank: Colonel
- Conflicts: Indian Mutiny; Second Anglo-Afghan War
- Awards: Victoria Cross; Order of the Bath

Colonel Sir Edward Talbot Thackeray VC KCB (19 October 1836 – 3 September 1927) was an English recipient of the Victoria Cross, the highest and most prestigious award for gallantry in the face of the enemy that can be awarded to British and Commonwealth forces.

The son of Rev. Francis Thackeray and Mary Anne Shakespear, he was the first cousin of the novelist, William Makepeace Thackeray and Sir Richmond Campbell Shakespear. He was educated at Marlborough College and Addiscombe Military Seminary.

Thackeray was 20 years old, and a second lieutenant in the Bengal Engineers, Bengal Army during the Indian Mutiny when the following deed took place on 16 September 1857 at Delhi, British India for which he was awarded the Victoria Cross

For cool intrepidity and characteristic daring in extinguishing a fire in the Delhi Magazine enclosure, on the 16th of September, 1857, under a close and heavy musketry fire from the enemy, at the imminent risk of his life from the explosion of combustible stores in the shed in which the fire occurred.

He later achieved the rank of colonel, and was elected to the Athenaeum in 1876. Thackeray retired from the Army in 1888 and in 1898 he went to live in Italy where he spent the rest of his life.

His medal is currently displayed at the National Museum of Military History in Johannesburg, South Africa.

== Works ==
- Views of Kabul and environs from pictures taken by the photograph school of the Corps of Bengal Sappers and Miners (1881)
- Two Indian Campaigns in 1857-58 (1896)
- Biographical notices of officers of the Royal (Bengal) engineers (1900)
- Reminiscences of the Indian Mutiny (1857–58) and Afghanistan (1879) (1916)

== References and sources ==
Sources

- The Register of the Victoria Cross (This England, 1997)
- The Sapper VCs (Gerald Napier, 1998)
- Monuments to Courage (David Harvey, 1999)
