= Francis Thackeray =

English clergyman and author

- Born: 1793
- Died: 1842 (aged 48–49)
- Education: Pembroke College, Cambridge
- Spouse: Mary Ann Shakespear (m. 1829)
- Children: 3+, including Francis and Edward
- Relatives: Thomas Thackeray (grandfather); William Thackeray (nephew)

Francis Thackeray (1793 – 1842) was a Church of England clergyman and author.

== Life ==
Thackeray was the sixth son of William Makepeace Thackeray (1749–1813) and his wife Amelia Webb, grandson of Thomas Thackeray (1693–1760), Head Master of Harrow School, and uncle of William Makepeace Thackeray, the novelist. Educated at Pembroke College, Cambridge, he was curate of Broxbourne, Hertfordshire.

== Works ==
- A Defence of the Clergy of the Church of England, 1822
- A History of the Right Honourable William Pitt, Earl of Chatham, 1827; Macaulay claimed its praise of Pitt the elder was uncritical.
- Order against Anarchy, 1831. A reply to Thomas Paine's Rights of Man
- Researches into the Ecclesiastical and Political State of Ancient Britain under the Roman Emperors, 1843

== Family ==
Thackeray married in 1829 Mary Ann Shakespear (died 1851), daughter of John Shakespear. Their sons included Francis St. John Thackeray (1832–1919) and Edward Talbot Thackeray. Their daughter Mary Augusta Thackeray was given an album of drawings about Bluebeard by William Makepeace Thackeray, her first cousin, in 1841.
