= Thackery =

Thackery may refer to:

== People ==
- Bud Thackery (1903–1990), American cinematographer
- Carl Thackery (born 1962), British long-distance runner
- Colin Thackery (born 1930), English Korean War veteran and singer
- Elizabeth Thackery (1767–1856), the first convict female to land in Australia
- Jimmy Thackery (born 1953), American blues singer and guitarist

== Fictional characters ==
- Dr. John Thackery, in TV series The Knick
- Thackery Binx, in the 1993 film Hocus Pocus
- Thackery Earwicket, the March Hare from the 2010 film Alice in Wonderland

== Places ==
- Thackery, a suburb of Matlock, Victoria, Australia
- Thackery, Ohio, United States

== See also ==
- Thackeray (disambiguation)
  - William Makepeace Thackeray (1811–1863), British novelist, author and illustrator
- Thackray, a surname
- Thackrey, a surname
- The Thackery T. Lambshead Pocket Guide to Eccentric & Discredited Diseases, a 2003 anthology of fantasy medical conditions
