= Thackrey =

Thackrey is a surname. Notable people with the surname include:

- Sean Thackrey (1942–2022), American winemaker
- Ted Thackrey (1901–1980), American journalist and publisher
- Tim Thackrey (born 1979), American taekwondo athlete
- Bal Thackeray (1926-2012), Indian Politician

== See also ==
- Thackeray (disambiguation)
- Thackery (disambiguation)
- Thackray, a surname
