= Thomas Thackeray =

English clergyman and schoolmaster

- Born: 1693; Hampsthwaite, West Riding of Yorkshire, England
- Died: 25 August 1760 (aged 66–67)
- Education: King's College, Cambridge
- Employer(s): Eton College; Harrow School
- Spouse: Anne Woodward (m. 1729; died 1760)
- Children: 16, including John
- Relatives: Frederick Thackeray (grandson); George Thackeray (grandson); Francis Thackeray (grandson); William Thackeray (grandson)

Thomas Thackeray (1693 – 25 August 1760) was a Church of England clergyman who taught at his old school, Eton College, and ended his career as Head Master of Harrow School. He received the degree of Doctor of Divinity (DD).

== Life ==
Born in 1693, a son of Timothy Thackeray, parish clerk of Hampsthwaite, in the West Riding of Yorkshire (now in North Yorkshire), who was one of a family of yeomen, Thackeray was born at Hampsthwaite and from 1706 was educated as a King's Scholar at Eton College. In 1712, he became a scholar of King's College, Cambridge, was elected a fellow of the college in 1715, and then returned to his old school, Eton, as an assistant schoolmaster. In 1728, he gained a benefice, as Rector of Little Chishall, Essex, which he held until his death. The same year, he was appointed as Rector of Heydon. In 1729, he married Anne Woodward, and with her went on to have sixteen children.

In 1743, Thackeray narrowly missed being elected as provost of his old college, King's. In 1746, he was chosen as Head Master of Harrow School, and in 1748 as chaplain to Frederick, Prince of Wales. The prince's early death in 1751 dashed some of his hopes of future royal preferment, but he remained on excellent terms with the new heir to the throne, Prince George, and in 1753 Benjamin Hoadly, Bishop of Winchester, gave him the sinecure of archdeacon of Surrey, which was worth another £130 a year, equivalent to £25,004 in 2023.

Thackeray was looked on at Harrow as a wise appointment, as he had many useful social contacts, especially among the nobility. In the 1750s, Prince George's friend (and future prime minister) John Stuart, 3rd Earl of Bute, sent his sons to Harrow.

When he died in 1760, a month after retiring as head master, fourteen of Thackeray's sixteen children were still alive, and he was able to leave each of them £300, equivalent to £57,294 in 2023. His widow lived on until 1797, when she left a house at Eton and an estate worth £10,000.

== Descendants ==
Thackeray's fourth son, Thomas Thackeray (1736–1806), was a surgeon at Cambridge and was the father of William Makepeace Thackeray (1770–1849), a physician at Chester; Elias Thackeray (1771–1854), Vicar of Dundalk, in County Louth; John Richard Thackeray (1772–1846), churchman; and Jane Townley Thackeray (1788–1871), who in 1813 married George Pryme, an economist.

Thackeray's fifth son, Frederick (1737–1782), was a physician at Windsor and was the father of General Frederick Rennell Thackeray; George Thackeray, Provost of King's College, Cambridge; and Jane, who married James Rennell in 1772.

Thackeray's other fourteen children included Anne, John, Alethia, Henrietta, Martha, Theodosia, and Decima.

The youngest of Thomas Thackeray's children, William Makepeace Thackeray (1749–1813), became a clerk of the East India Company and made a fortune in India. He was designated as the first Collector of Sylhet in 1772. He returned to England four years later. His children included Francis Thackeray, author of the Life of Lord Chatham (1827); and Richmond Thackeray, born in 1781, Secretary to the Board of Revenue at Calcutta, who married Anne Becher, a daughter of John Harman Becher, and was the father of the novelist William Makepeace Thackeray (1811–1863), an only child who was born at Calcutta in 1811.

Thackeray is a direct ancestor of the comedian Al Murray, a great-great-great-grandson of the novelist William Makepeace Thackeray.
