= White Lodge, Monken Hadley =

House in Monken Hadley, London, England

Coordinates: 51°39′41″N 0°11′41″W

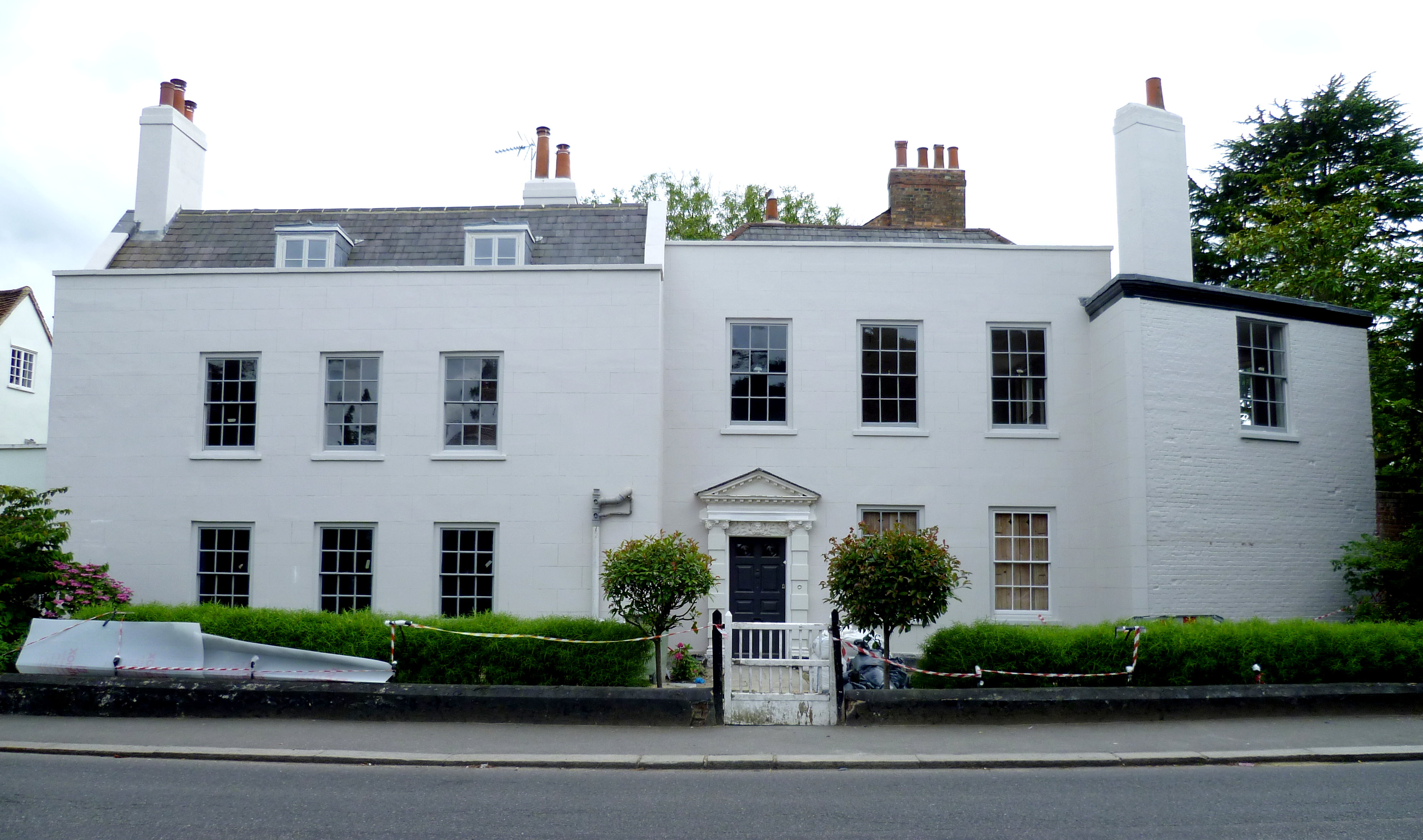
White Lodge in the process of renovation, August 2015.

White Lodge is a grade II listed building on Hadley Green Road in Monken Hadley. The original house was built before 1711, and extended in the late 18th century.

The ornate door case is a particular feature of the house and the 2009 conservatory extension in steel at the rear of the property received a certificate of merit in the use of steelwork.

The property was placed on the market by Statons in 2011 and sold in November 2013 for £3.3 million. As of July 2015, the property is in the process of renovation.
