= John Tremayne Rodd =

Vice-Admiral Sir John Tremayne Rodd KCB
- Born: c. 1769
- Died: 4 October 1838; Tunbridge Wells, Kent, England
- Military career
- Allegiance: United Kingdom
- Branch: Royal Navy
- Service years: 1780s to 1838
- Rank: Vice-Admiral
- Conflicts: French Revolutionary Wars; Napoleonic Wars; Battle of Basque Roads
- Awards: Knight Commander of the Order of the Bath

Vice-Admiral Sir John Tremayne Rodd, KCB (c. 1769 – 4 October 1838) was an officer of the Royal Navy noted for his services during the Napoleonic Wars. Rodd served in a number of ships, including HMS San Josef under Admiral Sir Charles Cotton and HMS Indefatigable during the Battle of the Basque Roads.

== Early life and education ==
Rodd was the third son of Francis Rodd (1732-1812), of Trebartha Hall, Cornwall, a JP and Colonel of the Cornwall militia, and Jane (died 1780), daughter of John Hearle, of Penryn, warden of the Cornish stannaries. The Rodds were armigerous landed gentry originally from Herefordshire, on record since the reign of King John. Rodd's grandfather, Captain Francis Rodd of the Coldstream Guards, had been bequeathed the Trebartha property in 1729. The Royal Navy officer and explorer of the Pacific Ocean Samuel Wallis was Rodd's uncle (married to his mother's sister); after Rodd's mother's death, Wallis "had charge of young Rodd's education", and "put him into the navy".

== Career ==
Having become a captain in 1788, during the French Revolutionary Wars he served as a commander in the sloops HMS Bonetta and HMS Scorpion. In the former he participated in the capture of the French privateer Le Poisson Volant in the West Indies on 4 August 1796, and in the latter he captured the Dutch privateer Courier, for which was promoted to post captain on 7 September 1798. After the Peace of Amiens in 1803, Rodd briefly took command of the first rate ship of the line HMS San Josef under Admiral Sir Charles Cotton, but by 1805 had moved to the veteran frigate HMS Indefatigable. In Indefatigable, Rodd served as the main scout for the British squadron blockading Brest, France. In 1805 he sighted the French fleet under Admiral Ganteaume attempting to escape and warned the Offshore Squadron, who drove the French back into Brest in a brief engagement. In 1806, Rodd was working in conjunction with Captain Lord Cochrane in HMS Pallas and on 15 July Indefatigable was the launch point for a fleet of small boats that attacked a French convoy in the Gironde.

In early 1809, Rodd gained information concerning the departure of the French frigate Niémen from Brest, which led to her capture in early April. The same month, Indefatigable was heavily engaged at the Battle of Basque Roads, in which the French fleet in Brest was driven onto shoals by fireships launched by Cochrane who then attacked. Cochrane was inadequately supported by Admiral Lord Gambier and as a result only five French ships were destroyed instead of the entire fleet. Throughout the battle Rodd was heavily engaged with superior enemy forces, closely supporting Cochrane's attack. In the summer of 1809 he was called as a witness at the Court-martial of James, Lord Gambier which assessed whether Gambier had failed to support Cochrane at the battle. Gambier was controversially cleared of all charges. He left Indefatigable soon afterwards. In 1809, Rodd married Jane Rennell, daughter of Major James Rennell, a noted geographer who often assisted her father in his work. In 1814, Rodd moved to the ship of the line HMS Warrior but was placed in reserve at the end of the war in the same year.

In 1825, Rodd was promoted to be a Rear-Admiral of the Red, and on 20 February 1832 he was knighted as a Knight Commander of the Order of the Bath. He died at Tunbridge Wells in October 1838, survived by his wife and recently promoted to vice-admiral.

== Personal life ==
In 1809, Rodd married Jane, only daughter of Major James Rennell, a geographer, historian, and pioneer of oceanography. Jane was considered "beautiful and refined, possessed of great talent." They had a son, Major James Rennell Rodd of the Royal Cornwall Rangers (father of Rennell Rodd, 1st Baron Rennell, and grandfather of Peter Rodd) and two daughters.
