= Thackray =

Thackray is a surname and given name. Notable people with the name include:

Surname:

- Arnold Thackray (born 1939), science historian, founding president of the Chemical Heritage Foundation
- Charles Thackray (1877–1934), an English pharmacist and manufacturer of surgical instruments
  - Thackray Museum of Medicine, in Leeds, West Yorkshire, England
- Emma-Jean Thackray, British bandleader, multi-instrumentalist, singer, DJ and producer
- Gail Thackray (born 1964), British-born model, actress, adult-magazine publisher
- Jake Thackray (1938–2002), English singer-songwriter, poet and journalist
- Jamie Thackray, English rugby league footballer
- Jane Thackray, basketball player
- Jerry Thackray (born 1961), British music journalist and musician, who performs as Everett True
- Kris Thackray (born 1988), English professional footballer

Given name:

- John Thackray Bunce (1828–1899), British journalist and author

== See also ==
- Thackery (disambiguation)
- Thackeray (disambiguation)
- Thackrey, a surname
