= John Richard Thackeray =

English churchman

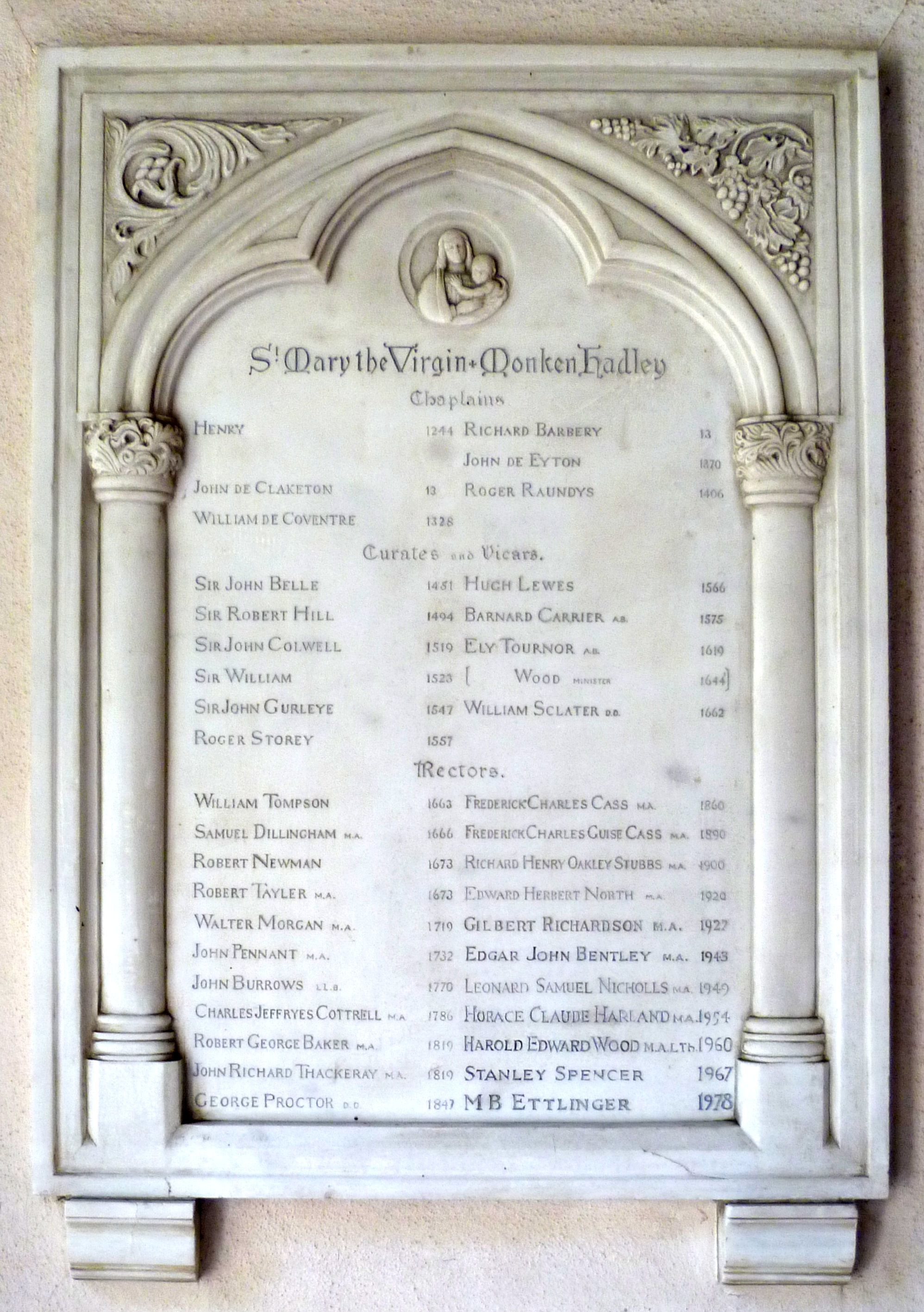
Plaque in the porch of St Mary the Virgin, Monken Hadley

John Richard Thackeray (17 May 1772 – 19 August 1846) was an English churchman and member of the Thackeray literary family.

== Early life ==
Thackeray was born on 17 May 1772, the fourth son of Thomas Thackeray (1736–1806), surgeon, of Cambridge and grandson of Thomas Thackeray DD (1693–1760). He attended Rugby School. He received his BA from Pembroke College, University of Cambridge, in 1794 and his MA in 1797.

== Clerical career ==
Thackeray was the vicar of Broxted, Essex, from 1810, and the rector of Downham Market and vicar of Wiggenhall St Mary Magdalen, both in Norfolk, from 1811. He was the rector of the parish of Monken Hadley, north of Chipping Barnet, from 1819.

== Family ==
Thackeray had brothers Elias (1790), William M. (1788), Frederick (1800), Joseph (1802) and Martin (1802). He married at Hatfield on 13 December 1810, Marianne Franks, daughter of William Franks of Beech Hill Park, Hadley Wood, and Fitzroy Square. The couple had a son, Richard W. (1833) and two daughters. Marianne died 23 March 1855.

== Death ==
Thackeray died on 19 August 1846 at Hadley after a short illness and he was buried on 24 August in a vault underneath the south transept of his own church St Mary the Virgin, Monken Hadley.
