= Jim Thackeray =

English footballer

Personal information
- Full name: James Thackeray
- Date of birth: 23 November 1881
- Place of birth: Hebburn, England
- Date of death: 1968 (aged 86–87)
- Position: Winger

Senior career*
Years	Team	Apps	(Gls)
1903–1904	Hebburn Argyle		
1904–1910	Middlesbrough	157	(16)
1910–1911	Bradford (Park Avenue)	33	(3)
1911	West Stanley		
Total		190	(19)
- * Club domestic league appearances and goals

James Thackeray (23 November 1881–1968) was an English footballer who played in the Football League for Bradford (Park Avenue) and Middlesbrough.
