= Frederick Rennell Thackeray =

British Army officer

General Frederick Rennell Thackeray CB
- Born: 21 January 1775; Windsor, Berkshire
- Died: 19 September 1860 (aged 85); Windlesham, Bagshot, Surrey
- Military career
- Allegiance: United Kingdom
- Branch: British Army
- Service years: 1793–1837
- Rank: General

General Frederick Rennell Thackeray CB (1775 – 19 September 1860) was a senior British Army officer.

== Early life ==
Thackeray was born in Windsor, Berkshire, a younger son of physician Dr Frederick Thackeray, and a grandson of Thomas Thackeray, headmaster of Harrow School. His first cousin once removed was the writer William Makepeace Thackeray.

== Military career ==
He entered the Royal Military Academy in Woolwich and became a second lieutenant in the Royal Artillery in 1793 but transferred to the Royal Engineers the following year. He served from 1793 at Gibraltar, where he was promoted first lieutenant in 1796, and then transferred to the West Indies in 1797. He took part, on 20 August 1799, in the capture of Surinam under Sir Thomas Trigge. In 1801 he was aide-de-camp to Trigge at the capture of the Swedish West India island of St. Bartholomew, the Dutch island of St. Martin and the Danish islands of St. Thomas and St. John.

In 1807, now a captain, he was sent to Sicily, from where he proceeded to Egypt with the expedition under Major-General Alexander Mackenzie Fraser, returning to Sicily in September. In 1809 Thackeray was the commanding Royal Engineer with a force under Lieutenant-Colonel Haviland Smith, and was detached by Lieutenant-General Sir John Stuart to make an attack on the castle of Scylla, which Thackeray directed with such skill that although his siege was raised by a superior French force, the castle had by then become untenable and had to be blown up.

In 1810 Thackeray was sent from Messina to join Colonel John Oswald in the Ionian Islands with orders to take part in the siege of the fortress of Santa Maura on the island of Lefkada. The position of the fortress on a long narrow isthmus of sand rendered it difficult to approach, and it was not only well supplied, but contained casemated barracks for a garrison of eight hundred men under General Camus. The now-General Oswald effected a landing on 23 March and the enemy were driven out of their forward entrenchments at bayonet point by the 35th Regiment of Foot. Large working parties were at once sent in and the entrenchment converted into a secure lodgement from which the British infantry and sharpshooters were so able to distress the artillery of the fort that it surrendered. Thackeray was mentioned in general orders and in despatches and received on 19 May 1810 a brevet majority in special recognition of his services on this occasion.

Major Thackeray sailed in July 1812 with the Anglo-Sicilian army under Lieutenant-General Frederick Maitland and landed at Alicante in August. He took part in the operations of this army, which, after Maitland's resignation in October, was successively commanded by Generals Mackenzie, William Henry Clinton, Colin Campbell, and Sir John Murray, who arrived in February 1813. In 1813 Thackeray marched with them from Alicante to attack General Suchet, and was at the capture of Alcoy. He also took part in the Battle of Castalla when Suchet was defeated. In May 1813 he embarked with the army, fourteen thousand strong, with a powerful siege train and ample engineer stores, for Tarragona, where they disembarked in June. Thackeray directed the siege operations, and by 8 June a practicable breach was made in Fort Royal, an outwork over four hundred yards in advance of the place.

Thackeray was promoted to be lieutenant-colonel in the Royal Engineers in July 1813. He had moved, at the end of June, with Lord William Bentinck's army to Alicante, and was at the occupation of Valencia on 9 July, and at the Siege of Tarragona on 30 July. He took part in the other operations of the army under Bentinck and his successor, Sir William Clinton. During October and November Thackeray was employed in rendering Tarragona once more defensible. In April 1814, by Wellington's orders, Clinton's army was broken up, and Thackeray returned to England in ill-health.

At the beginning of 1815 he was appointed commanding Royal Engineer at Plymouth, transferred to Gravesend in 1817, and thence to Edinburgh in 1824 as commanding Royal Engineer of North Britain. He was promoted to be colonel in the Royal Engineers on 2 June 1825 and made a Companion of the Bath on 26 September 1831.

In 1833 he was appointed commanding Royal Engineer in Ireland and promoted to be major-general on 10 January 1837 when he retired. He was made a colonel-commandant of the Corps of Royal Engineers on 29 April 1846, was promoted lieutenant-general later that year, and made full General on 20 June 1854.

== Personal life ==
Thackeray and his wife, Lady Elizabeth Margaret Carnegie, third daughter of William, 7th Earl of Northesk, were wed on 24 November 1825. In 1843, the couple bought The Cedars Estate in Windlesham. He had three sons and five daughters.

== Death ==
He died at his home in Windlesham, Bagshot, Surrey, on 19 September 1860, and was buried at York Town, Farnborough.
