= Mary Rodd, Lady Rennell =

English painter

Mary Constance Vivian Rodd, Lady Rennell (née Smith; 5 November 1901 – 31 May 1981) was an English landscape artist working mainly in pencil, chalk, and oils.

== Life and career ==
Rennell was born in London, the third of seven children daughter of the first Lord Bicester and Lady Sybil McDonnell. The family took frequent holidays to Glenarm Castle, home of her maternal grandparents, William McDonnell, 6th Earl of Antrim and Louisa McDonnell, Countess of Antrim. She was educated at home by private tutors, but at 17 she joined the Slade School of Fine Art as a part-time student while also, for several months, working as a ward maid for the war wounded before the Armistice on 11 November 1918. After leaving art school she shared a studio with Diana Walton in Kennington, London.

In the 1930s, Rennell was introduced to the Oxford Group by a friend of her mother. This later became the Moral Re-armament Association (MRA) of which Rennell was an active participant for 18 years. In 1940, Rennell took her children to America to avoid the impact of World War II on London. Before returning to Britain, in 1943, she held a one-woman show of drawings in New York. From 1952 onwards she travelled extensively. In Australia she held one-woman shows in both Perth and Melbourne in 1968. She also exhibited frequently in London at the Royal Society of British Artists, The Royal Society of Portrait Painters and at the Royal Academy.

Originally Rennell mostly painted landscapes in oils but later turned to drawing in ink on rice paper. There are seven works by Rennell in the Tate's prints and drawings collection. The Arts Council of Wales and the National Library of Wales in Aberystwyth also hold examples of her work.

== Personal life ==
In 1928, Rennell married Francis Rodd (1895–1978), an explorer, diplomat and author. His position allowed the couple to travel around the world. The couple had four daughters.

Rennell's experience with Moral Re-armament led to her conversion to Catholicism in 1952. In 1978, she became an oblate of St Benedict attached to Stanbrook Abbey (then in Callow End, Worcester).

She died in Oxford, aged 79.
