= James Rennell =

English geographer, historian and oceanographer (1742–1830)

James Rennell FRS, FRSE, FRGS
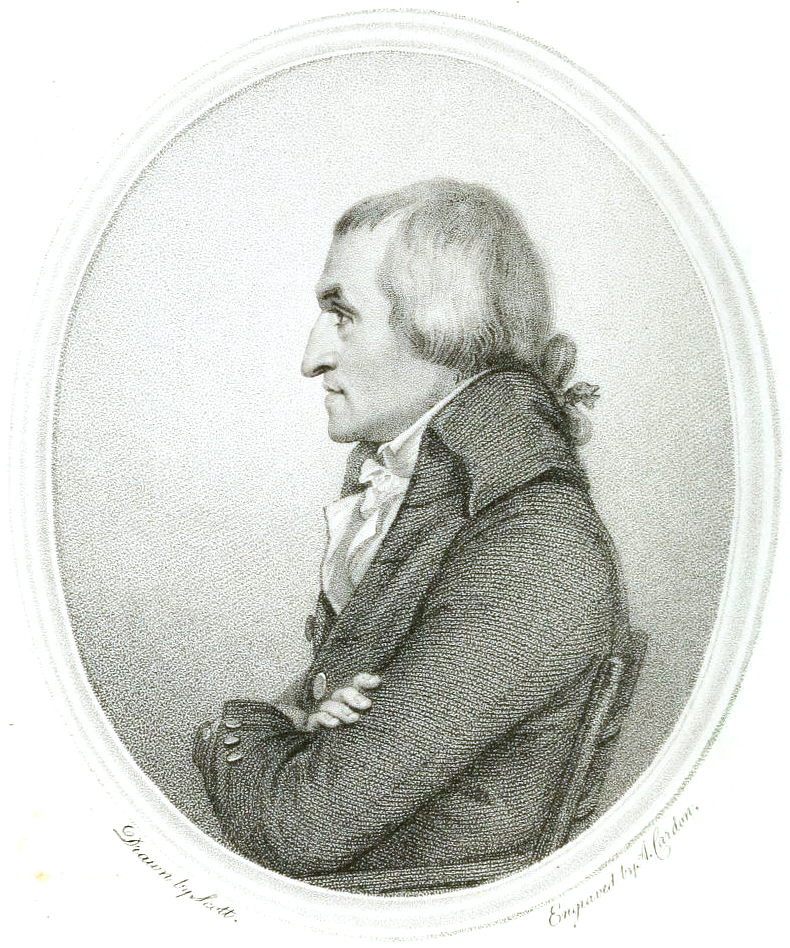
- Profile engraving of James Rennell (1799)
- Born: 3 December 1742; Chudleigh, Devon, UK
- Died: 29 March 1830 (aged 87); London
- Resting place: Westminster Abbey
- Occupations: Surveyor; Cartographer; Historian
- Employer: East India Company
- Spouse: Jane Thackeray (m. 1772–1810)
- Father: John Rennell

Signature
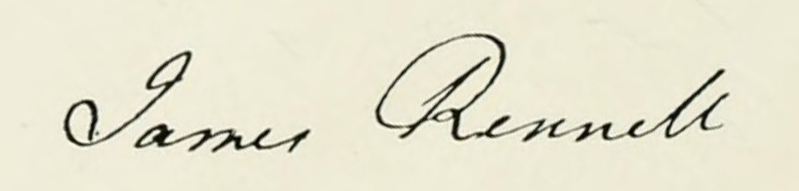

Major James Rennell FRS FRSE FRGS (3 December 1742 – 29 March 1830) was an English geographer, historian and a pioneer of oceanography. Rennell produced some of the first accurate maps of Bengal at one inch to five miles as well as accurate outlines of India and served as Surveyor General of Bengal. Rennell has been called the Father of Oceanography. In 1830, he was one of the founders of the Royal Geographical Society in London.

== Early life ==
Rennell was born at Upcot near Chudleigh in Devon. His father, John Rennell, an officer in the Royal Artillery, was killed in action in the Low Countries in July 1747 during the War of the Austrian Succession. His mother Anne subsequently married Mr Elliott, a widower with children of his own and unable to care for additional ones, leading to Rennell being brought up by a guardian, the Rev. Gilbert Burrington, vicar of Chudleigh. The ancient paternal Devonshire family name was formerly spelt Reynell and was of French origin.

Rennell entered the Royal Navy as a midshipman at the age of fourteen under Captain Hyde Parker, who was in the process of commissioning the frigate HMS Brilliant (launched in October 1757) at the beginning of the Seven Years' War. He was present at the Raid on Cherbourg (1758), and at the disastrous Battle of Saint-Cast in the same year. In 1760, he went out to East India, and served in HMS Grafton under Captain Hyde Parker during the three following years, when he saw some active service, including a cutting-out expedition at Pondicherry. He soon mastered the theory and practice of marine surveying, and, on account of his proficiency in this regard, Parker lent his services to the East India Company. He served for a year on board one of the company's ships bound to the Philippines, with the object "of establishing new branches of trade with the natives of the intervening places". Rennell accompanied the hydrographer Alexander Dalrymple and drew several charts and plans of harbours on journeys in the schooner Cuddalore (1759–62), the London (1762–63) and the Neptune (1763–64).

In 1763, at the end of the Seven Years' War, seeing no chance of promotion, Rennell entered the service of the East India Company's sea service. He at once received command of a vessel of two hundred tons; but it was destroyed by a hurricane in Madras Roads in March 1763. Fortunately, his captain was on shore, and he was at once appointed to command a small yacht called the Neptune, in which he executed surveys of what is now called the Palk Strait and the Pamban Channel. Rennell became a good friend of the Governor of Madras, Robert Palk, who also came from Devon. His next cruise was to Bengal, and he arrived at Calcutta at a time when Governor Vansittart was anxious to initiate a survey of the British territory. Owing to the friendship of an old messmate Mr Topham, who had become the governor's secretary, he was chosen for survey duties and was initially commissioned as an ensign in the Bengal Engineers, dated 9 April 1764.

== Survey work in India ==
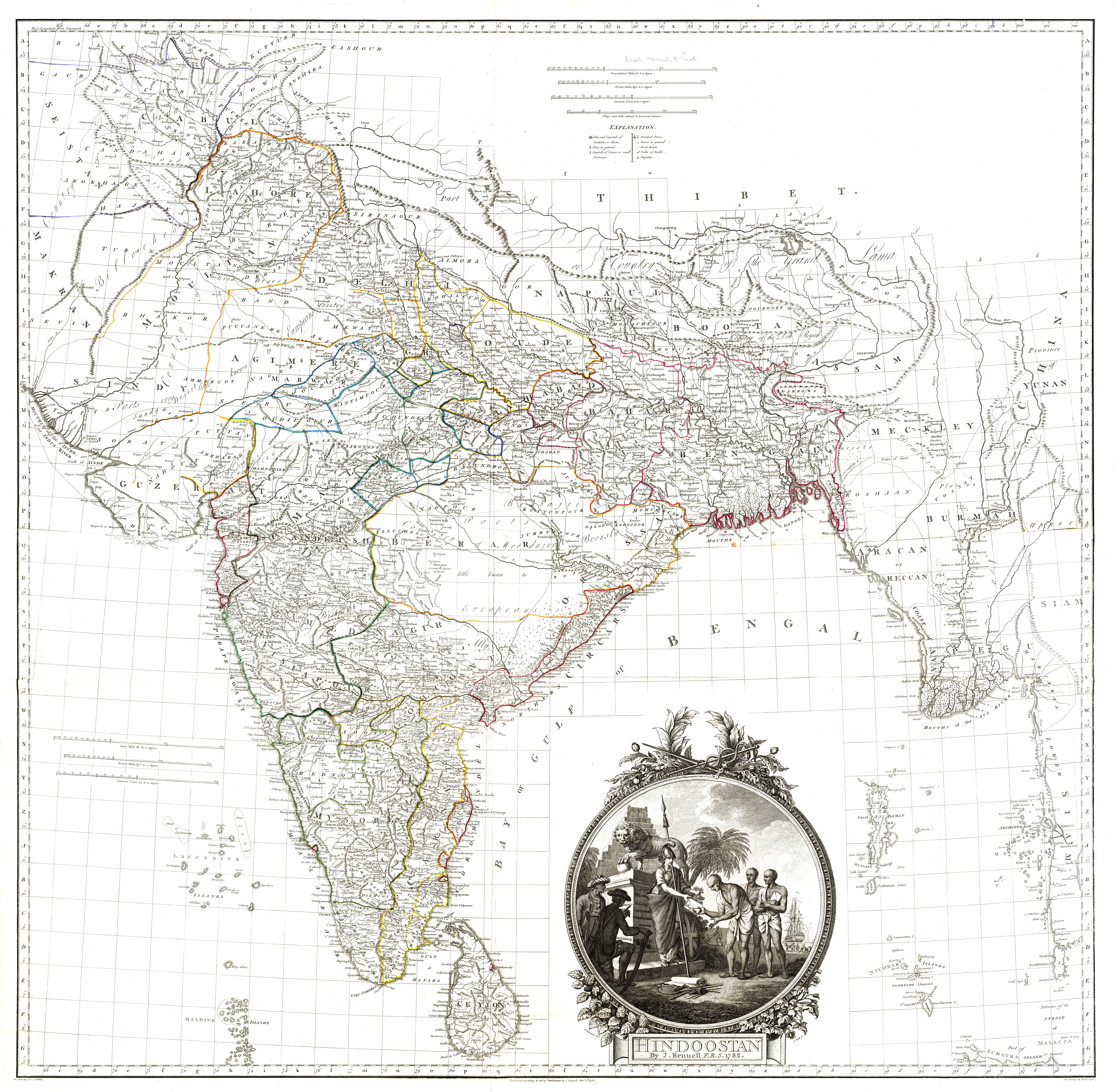
Map of Hindoostan, 1782

Rennell initially surveyed the Ganges river starting in the autumn of 1764, encountering in 1766 the mountains that he called the Tartarian mountains (the Himalayas). The main purpose of the survey was to find a navigable waterway from Calcutta to the northern regions. In the same year Captain Rennell was nearly killed when the party of surveyors were attacked by sanyasis on the Bhutan border. Injured badly in the shoulder blade, he was taken by boat to Dacca, a journey that took six days. He was treated by Dr Francis Russell and was fortunate to recover although he never gained full function of his right arm. On return Rennell's work was much appreciated and he was recommended for a handsome salary of £1000 a year. Rennell immediately sent money home to his mother and sister while also showing gratitude by sending gifts to Rev. Burrington's children. In 1767 Lord Robert Clive, the then Governor of Bengal and Bihar, appointed him as surveyor-general of the East India Company's dominions in Bengal. After this Rennell was always accompanied by a company of Sepoys.

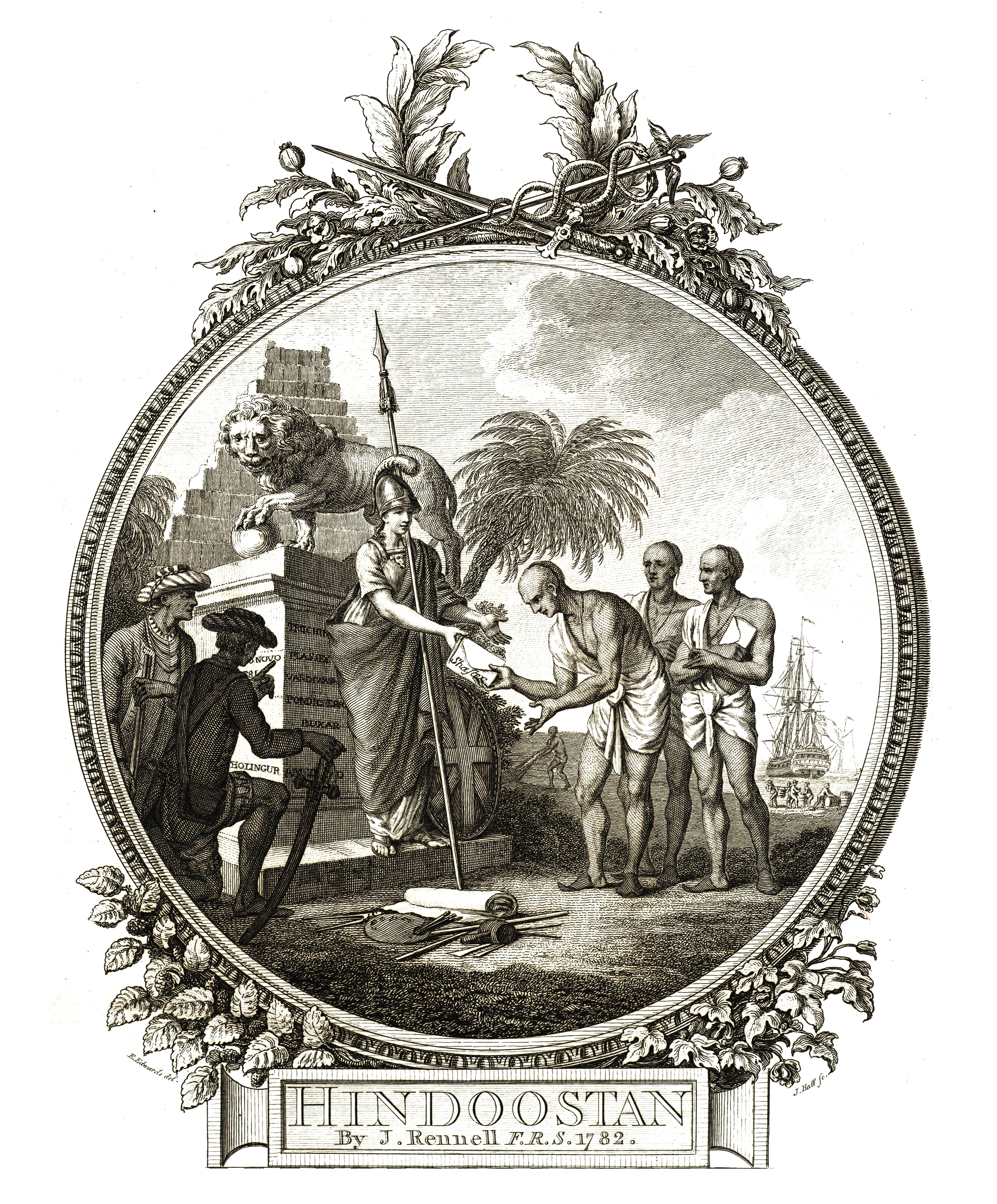
The cartouche of the 1782 map depicts, according to Rennell: "Brittannia receiving into her Protection, the sacred Books of the Hindoos, presented by the Pundits, or Learned Bramins: in Allusion to the humane Interposition of the British Legislature in Favor of the Natives of Bengal, in the Year 1781. Brittannia is supported by a Pedestal, on which are engraven the Victories, by means of which the British Nation obtained, and has hitherto upheld, its Influence in India: amongst which, the two recent ones of Porto Novo and Sholingur, gained by General [Eyre] Coote, are particularly pointed out by a Sepoy to his Comrade."

The headquarters of the surveyor-general were at Dacca, and in the successive working seasons he gradually completed his difficult, laborious, and dangerous task. Mapping was accomplished on the field by army men with distances measured using a perambulator - a calibrated wheel whose revolutions were counted to calculate distance - and a compass. Economic pressures further forced a reduction in pay and there was dissatisfaction among the native ranks on the question of double batta (part payment). The surveys were sometimes dangerous, a party of his men were attacked by a leopard and Rennell had to use his bayonet to save his men. Malaria was common and in 1771 he was briefly diverted to military duties in an expedition against a band of raiders. The mapping project was originally a general survey of newly acquired lands, but the job soon gained a wider scope under Warren Hastings, who was appointed as Governor-General in 1773. One of Hastings' first projects was to begin a Domesday-style reckoning of property, land, people, and culture for taxation of revenue. As for Rennell's part in this, his project was carried out much like a military survey, searching for safe passage through territory, with information gathering a secondary object. Rennell received the rank of major of Bengal engineers on 5 April 1776, and retired from active service in 1777. The government of Warren Hastings granted him a pension of £600 per annum, which the East India Company somewhat tardily confirmed.

James Rennell is the surveyor, architect & founder of Calcutta-Bombay Road in 1776. The Calcutta-Bombay Road, now known as Old Bombay Road & Odisha State Highway-19 was laid under his supervision in period of 1776-77. The route connected Cosseye River near Kharogpore (Kharagpur) with Subarnarekha river near Gopibalabpore (Gopiballavpur) & with Budhabalanga river near Bangiripossey (Bangriposi). The road was made through Lower parts of Southern Bengal (Gopiballavpur, Jhargram district) & Northern part of Odisha (Baripada, Baripada district) running for 132 kilometres (82 mi). For 200 years from 1776 until 1976, The Calcutta-Bombay Road (Old Bombay Road) was the vital route between Bengal & Bombay. The current Kolkata-Mumbai Road (now known as NH-6/NH-49) was built in the 1990s.

The remaining fifty-three years of his life were spent in London, and were devoted to geographical research chiefly among the materials in the East India House. He took up his residence in Suffolk Street, near Portland Place, where his house became a place of meeting for travellers from all parts of the world.

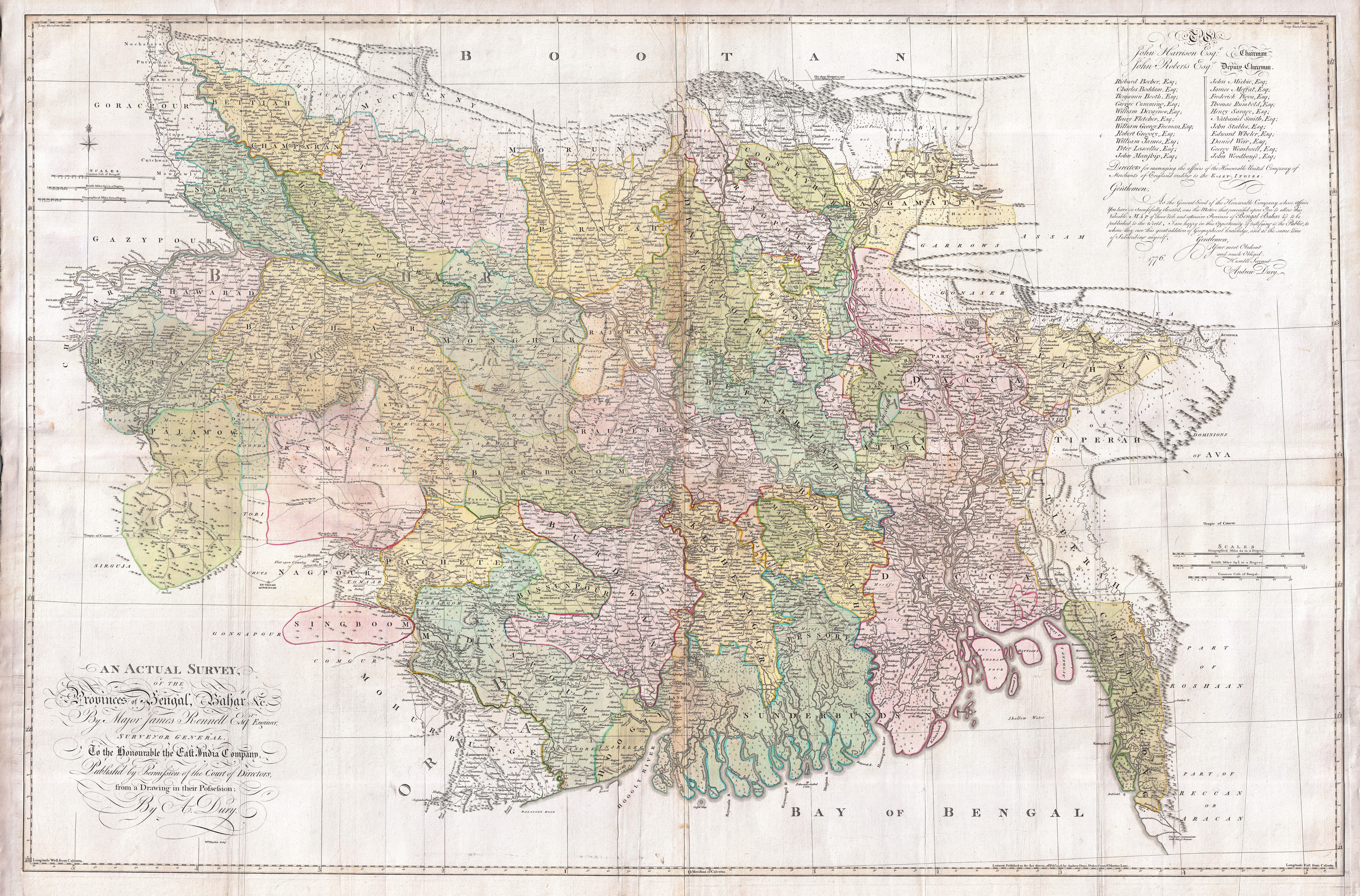
1776 map of Bengal and Bihar

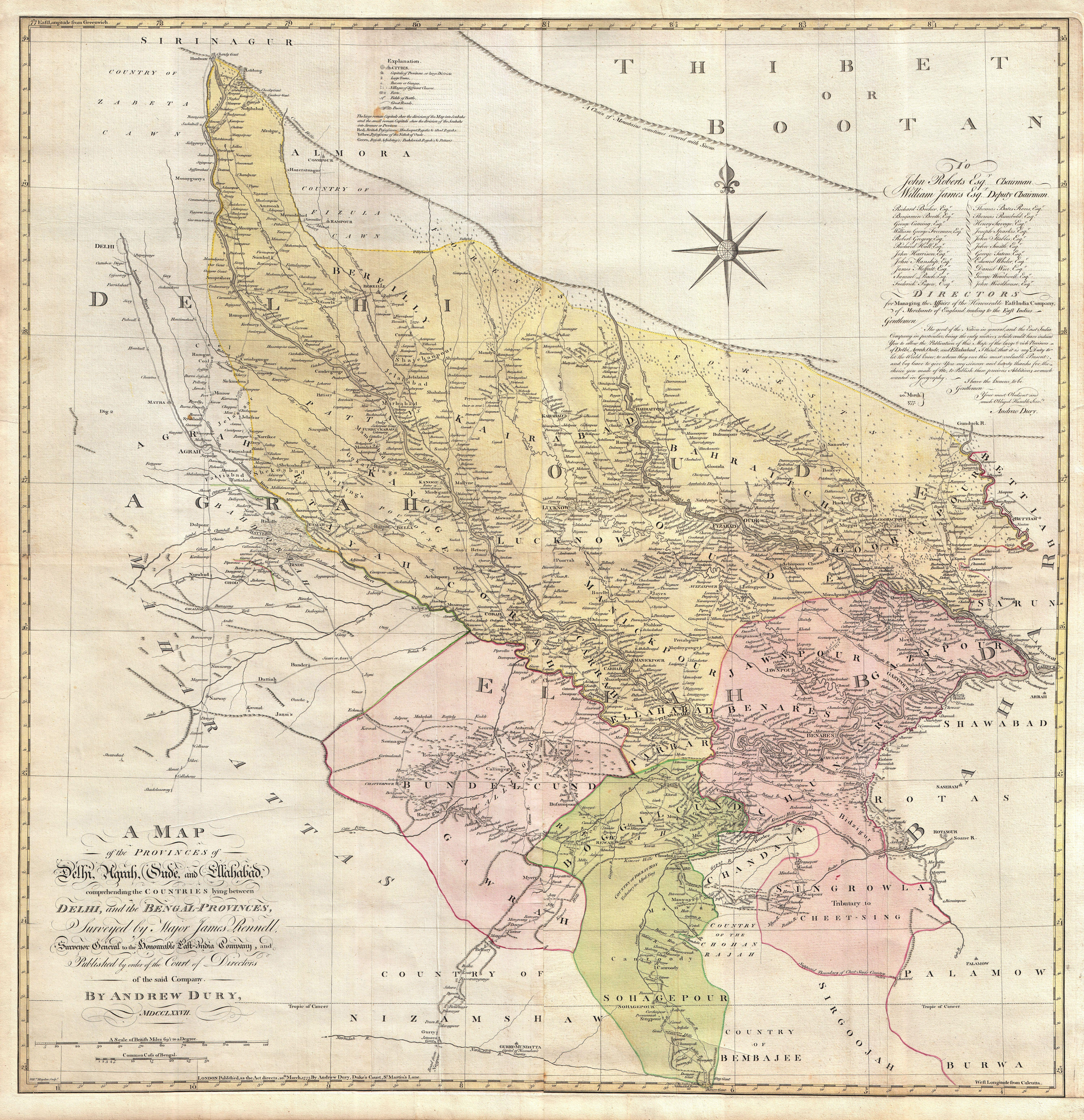
1777 map of northern-central India

1786 map following the Ganges River

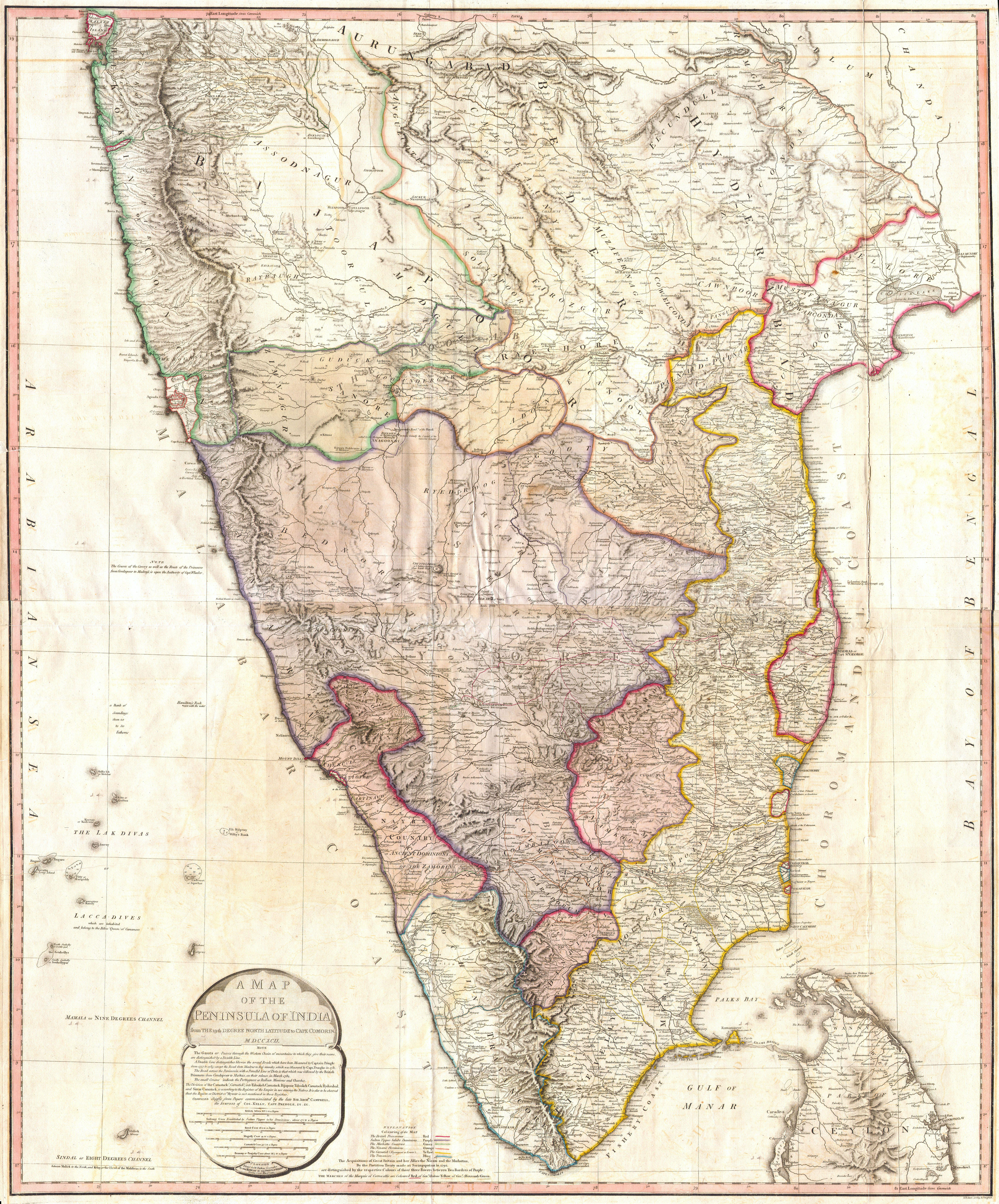
1793 map of the Indian peninsula and Ceylon

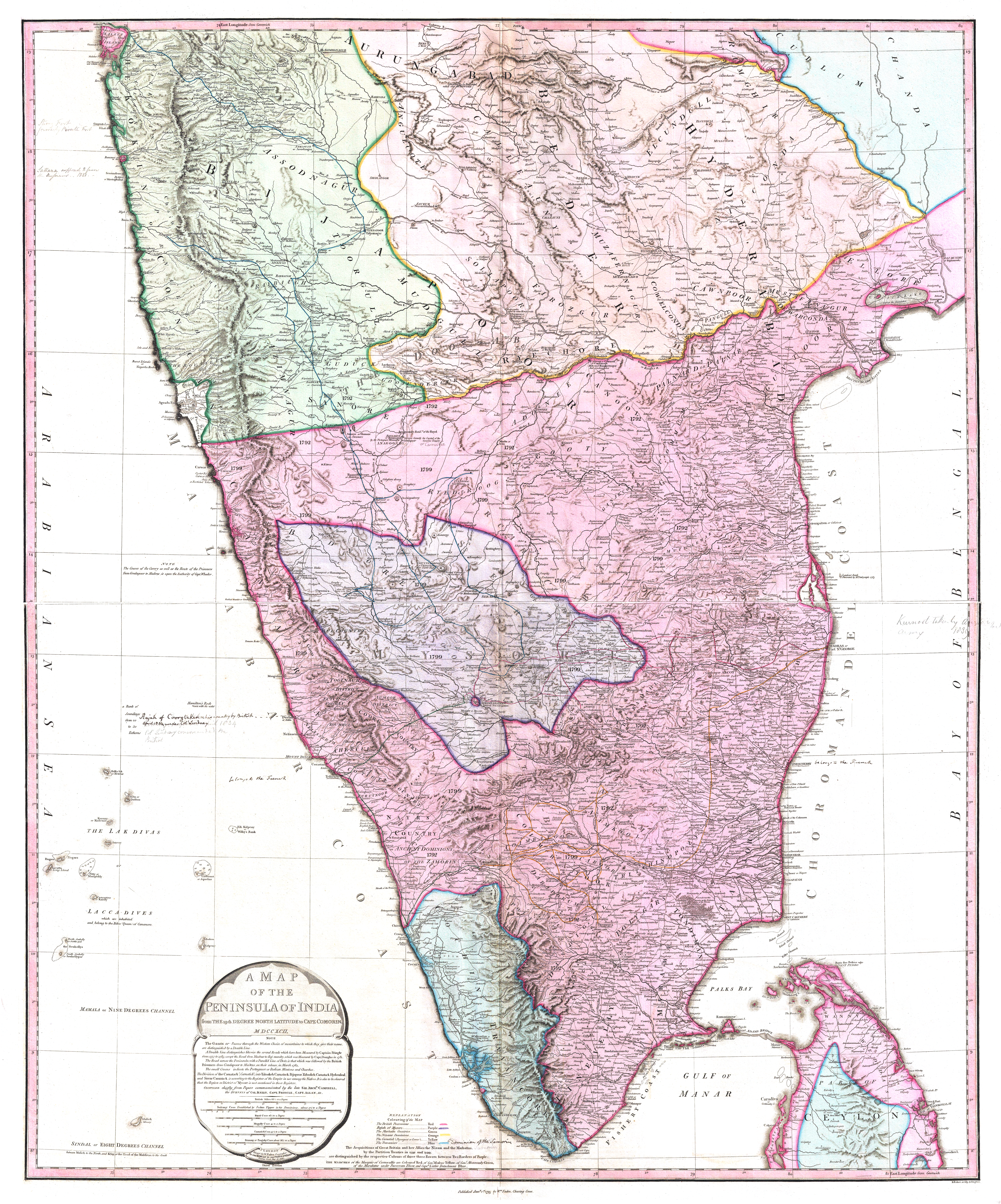
1800 map of the Indian peninsula and Ceylon

== Achievements ==
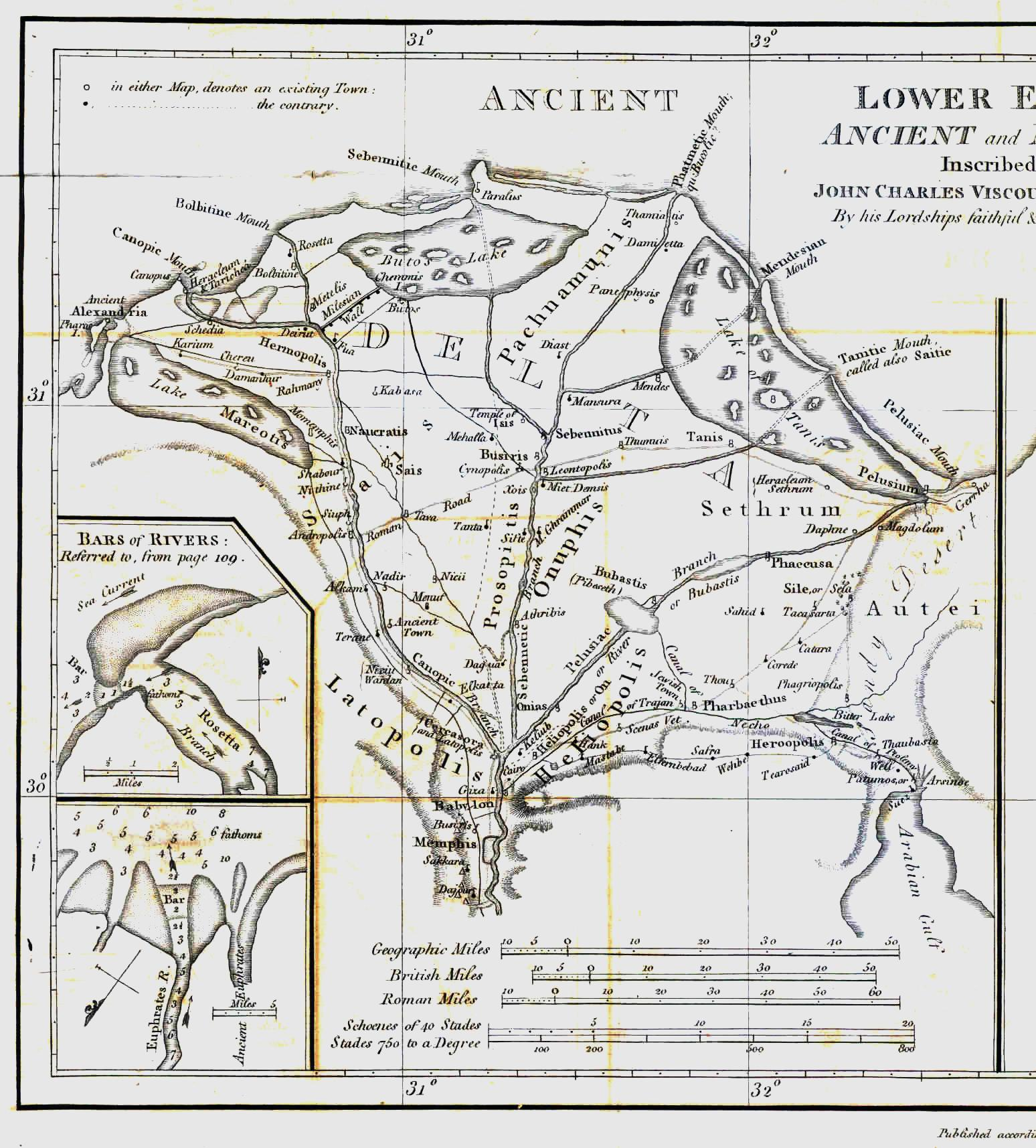
James Rennell's map of ancient Egypt, based upon the works of Herodotus.

Rennell's first and most influential work was the Bengal Atlas (1779) which was followed by the first detailed map of India (1783), the Geographical System of Herodotus (1800), the Comparative Geography of Western Asia (1831), and important studies on the geography of northern Africa—apparent in introductions to the Travels of Mungo Park and Hornemann. He also contributed papers to Archaeologia on the site of Babylon, the island of St Paul's shipwreck, and the landing-place of Caesar in Britain. Rennell published a book titled Memoir of a map of Hindoostan (1788) and dedicated to Sir Joseph Banks.

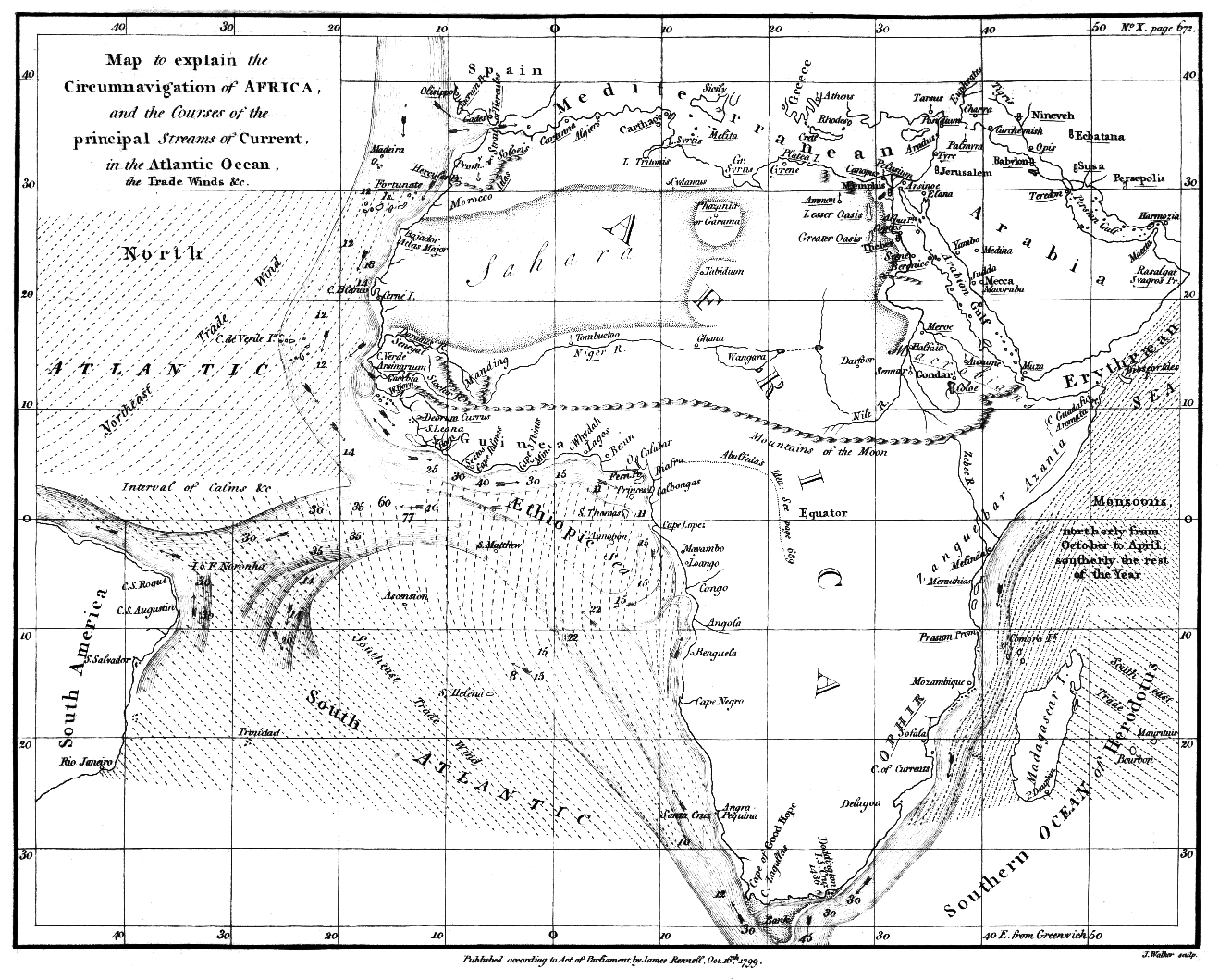
Map of the currents in Atlantic and Indian Ocean around Africa, created by James Rennell in 1799. Amazing is the accuracy of the marine currents and winds in contrast to the nearly fantasy-like depiction of the inner parts of Africa (unknown to the Europeans until 1877).

Beside his geographical and historical works, James Rennell is known today for his hydrographical works on the currents in the Atlantic and Indian oceans. He started his research on these topics when he was travelling by a sailing ship with his family from India to Britain after his retirement in 1777. During the extraordinary prolonged voyage around the Cape of Good Hope he mapped "the banks and currents at the Lagullas" and published in 1778 the work on what is today called the Agulhas Current. This was one of the first contributions to the science of Oceanography. He was the first to explain the causes of the occasional northern current found to the south of the Isles of Scilly, which has since been called as Rennell's Current.

After the death of his wife in 1810, he returned to the oceanographic topics. His numerous naval friends gave him a mass of data from their logs, which he assimilated into a chart of all currents in the Atlantic Ocean. During his last years, he wrote his last work Currents of the Atlantic Ocean, published posthumously by his daughter Jane in 1832.

He was elected a fellow of the Royal Society in 1781; and he received the Copley Medal of the Royal Society in 1791, and the gold medal of the Royal Society of Literature in 1825. James Rennell has been called the Father of Indian Geography, and for his pioneering work on oceanography as the Father of Oceanography.

In later life Rennell suffered from gout and in 1829 he fell from a chair and broke his thigh. He died on 29 March 1830 at his home on Suffolk Street. He was interred in the nave of Westminster Abbey, and there is a tablet to his memory, with a bronze bust by Ludwig Hagbold, near the western door. The year of his death saw the foundation of the Royal Geographical Society. His collection of books were gifted by his heirs to the Royal Geographical Society.

In 1851, botanist Pieter Willem Korthals published Rennellia, a genus of flowering plants from Indo-China and western Malesia, belonging to the family Rubiaceae and it was named in James Rennell's honour.

== Controversy ==
James Rennell is credited with the original mapping of the Mountains of Kong, supposedly located in the western part of Africa, based on information supplied by explorer Mungo Park. This range was intended to support his own theory on the course of the Niger River, and eventually led to a major impact on the mapping industry to include the mountains. In 1802, Aaron Arrowsmith released a map that included the Mountains of Kong as a main physical geographic feature of western Africa, which encouraged other publishers to update their maps to match.

Debate surrounding the existence of the mountain range occurred frequently, however, it was French officer and explorer Louis-Gustave Binger officially reported that the Mountains of Kong did not exist during an expedition in 1887-1888. It was not long after this that the Mountains of Kong were dropped from most map publications.

While the Mountains of Kong have been disproven, it has remained periodically on maps in until the early 20th century.

== Personal life ==
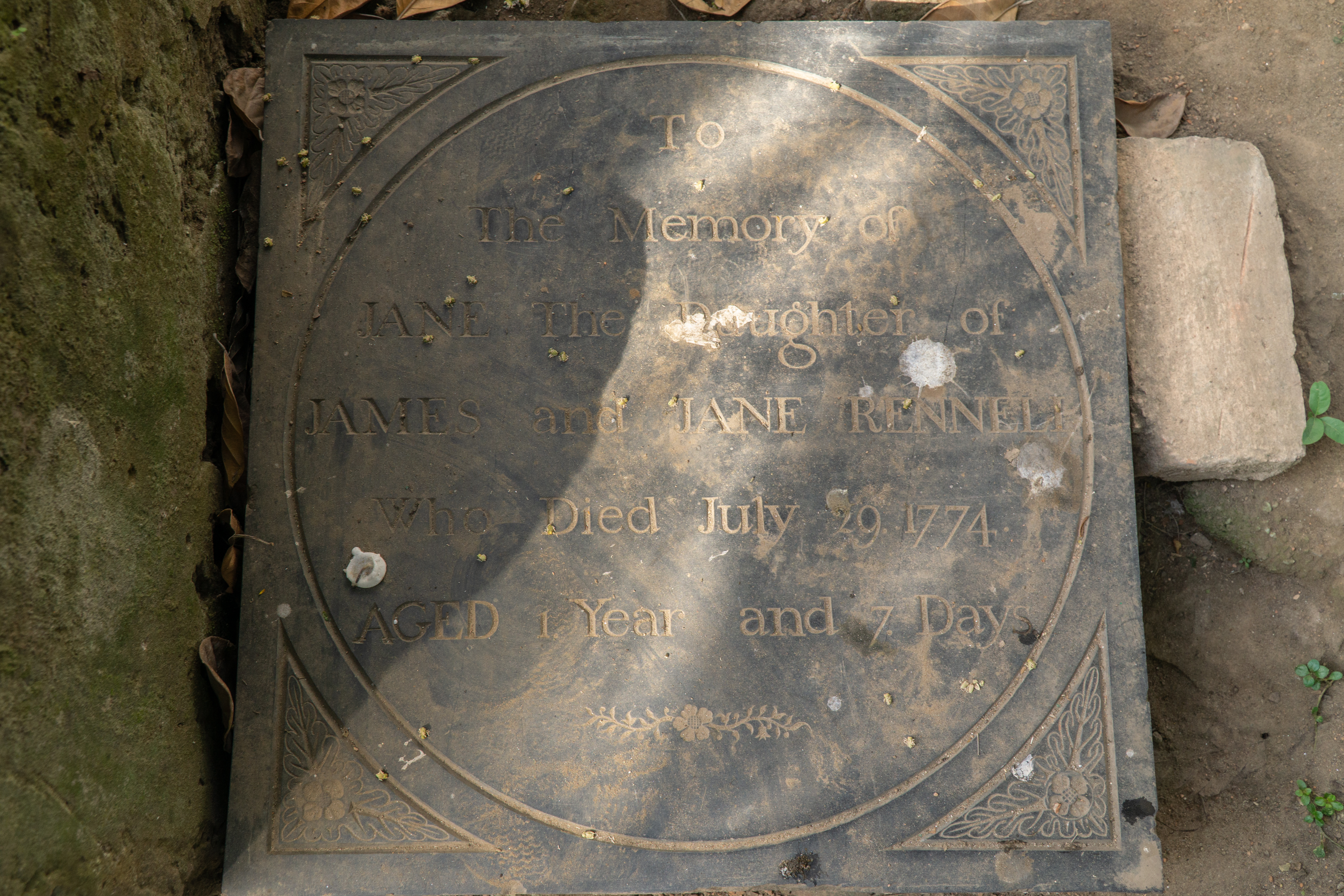
Tombstone inscription of daughter Jane Rennell: 1774. Dhaka Christian cemetery

Rennell was "of middle height, well proportioned, with a grave yet sweet expression of countenance. He was diffident and unassuming, but ever ready to impart information. His conversation was interesting, and he had a remarkable flow of spirits. In all his discussions he was candid and ingenuous". Rennell was however irrational in proposing that the Niger ended in a lake without reaching the sea. He was also strongly opposed to the methods of William Lambton in his proposed trigonometrical survey. His opposition had to be neutralized by Sir Nevil Maskelyne before Lambton's plan was approved.

While at Dacca, Rennell became a close friend of John Cartier. It was in Cartier's home that he met Jane Thackeray (d. 1810), daughter of Dr Thomas Thackeray, headmaster of Harrow, and a great-aunt of the novelist William Makepeace Thackeray and he married her in 1772. Their older son Thomas (born 1779) died unmarried in 1846, while the second son William (born 1781) worked in the Bengal civil service and died in 1819 without leaving any children. One daughter named Jane (born 1773) died young and was buried in Dhaka, whilst another daughter, also Jane, born in 1777 on St Helena where he had stopped on his way to England married Admiral Sir John Tremayne Rodd, KCB in 1809. Lady Rodd devoted several years publishing her father's current charts and revising new editions of his principal works. She died in December 1863.
