= List of listed buildings in Hadley =

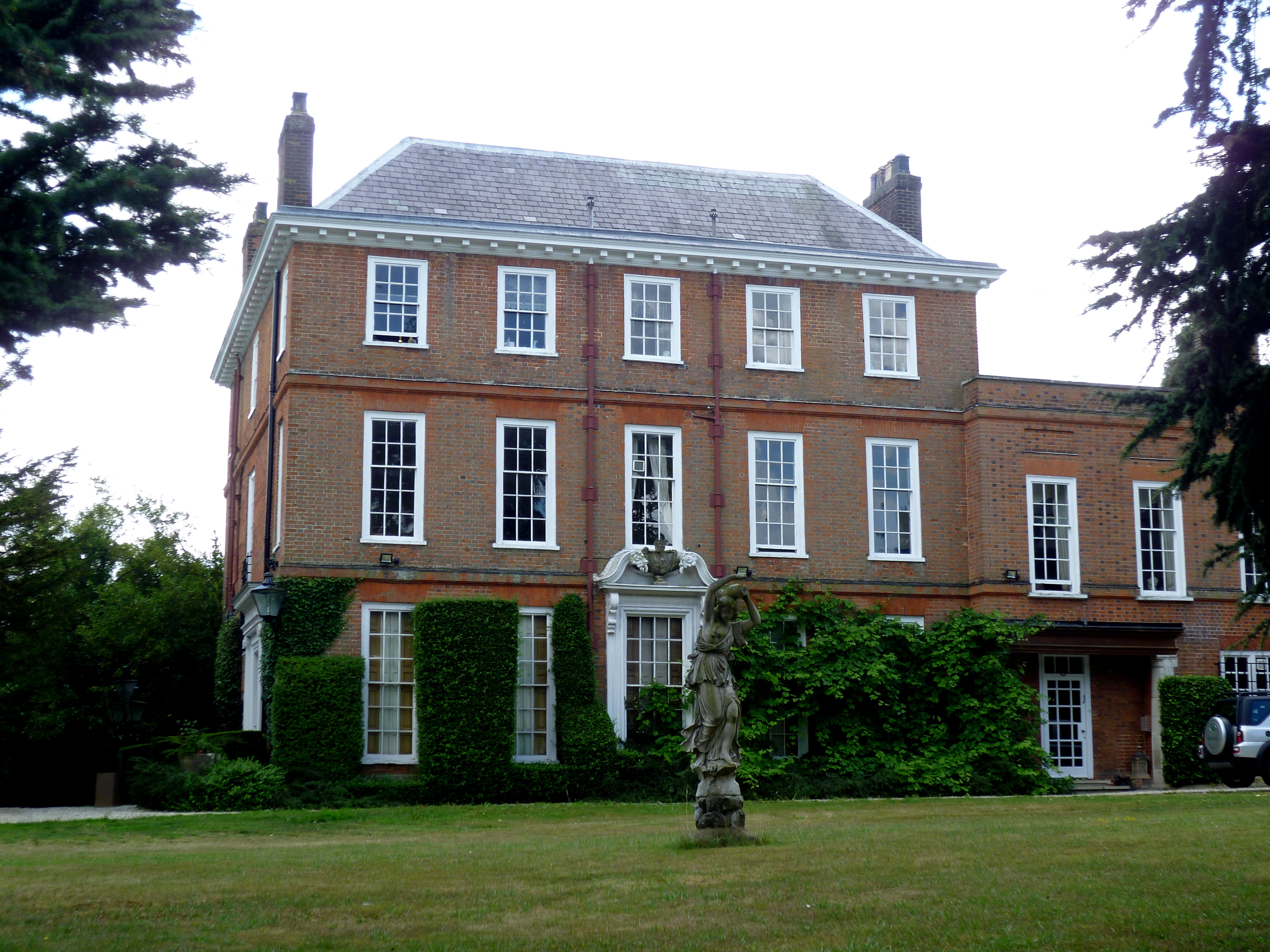
Hadley Hurst, a grade II* listed building on Hadley Common road.

This is an incomplete list of listed buildings in Hadley, in the London Borough of Barnet, England

- Anyho
- Fairholt, Hadley Green
- Gate House and Gate, Monken Hadley
- Grandon, Hadley Green
- Hadley Cote & The Old Cottage
- Hadley House, Hadley Green
- Hadley Hurst
- Hurst Cottage
- Hollybush, Monken Hadley
- Lemmons
- Livingston Cottage and Monken Cottage
- Mount House, Monken Hadley
- Old Fold Manor Golf Club House
- Ossulston House
- Pagitts Almshouses
- Pymlicoe House
- The Chase, Hadley Common
- White Lodge, Monken Hadley
