= The Grove, Monken Hadley =

Coordinates: 51.6621°N 0.1944°W

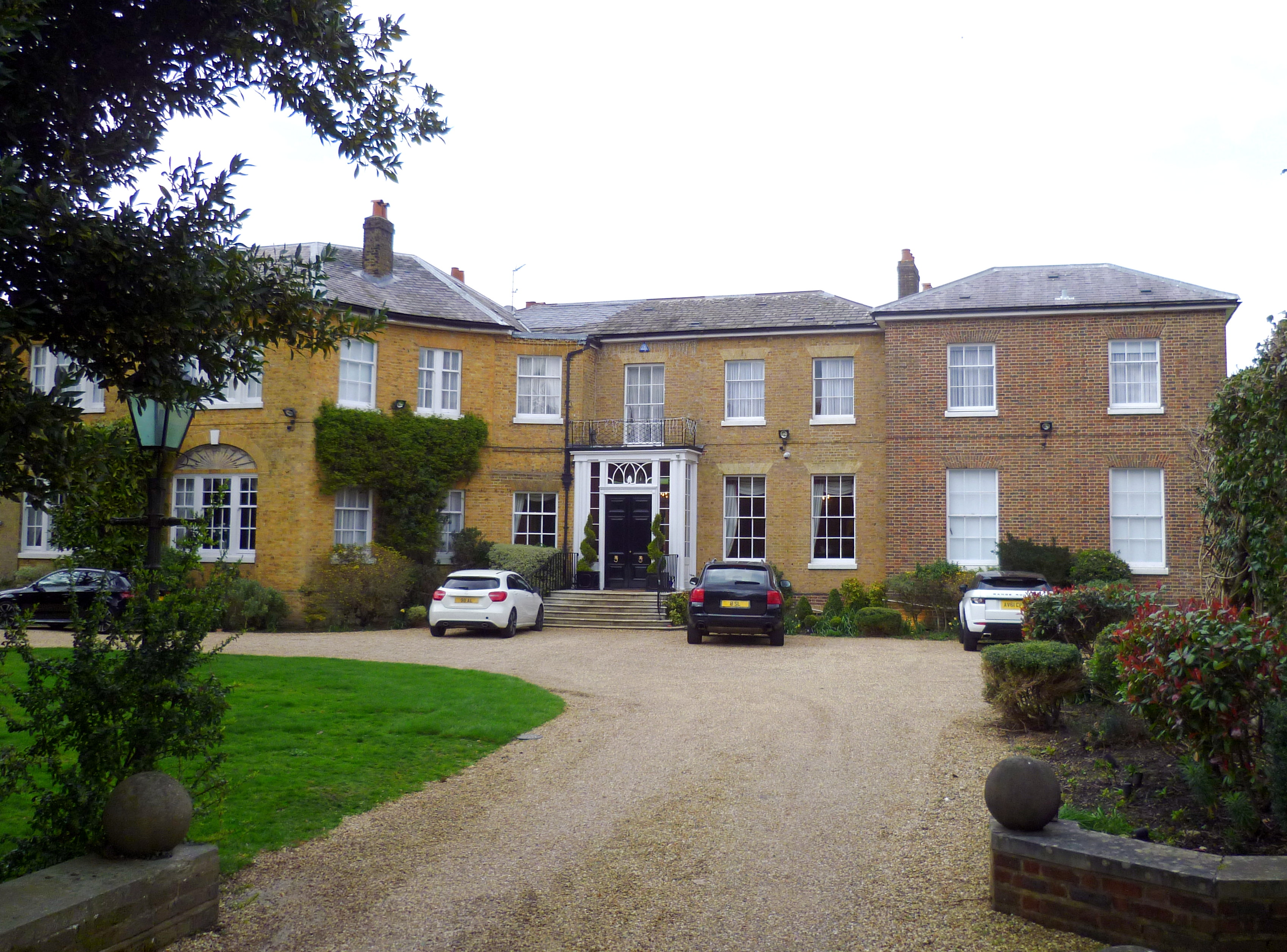
The Grove

The Grove is a grade II listed building in Hadley Green Road, Monken Hadley, London, England. The house dates from around the 1800s, but was greatly altered in the 20th century.
