= Pagitts Almshouses =

Coordinates: 51°39′41″N 0°11′38″W

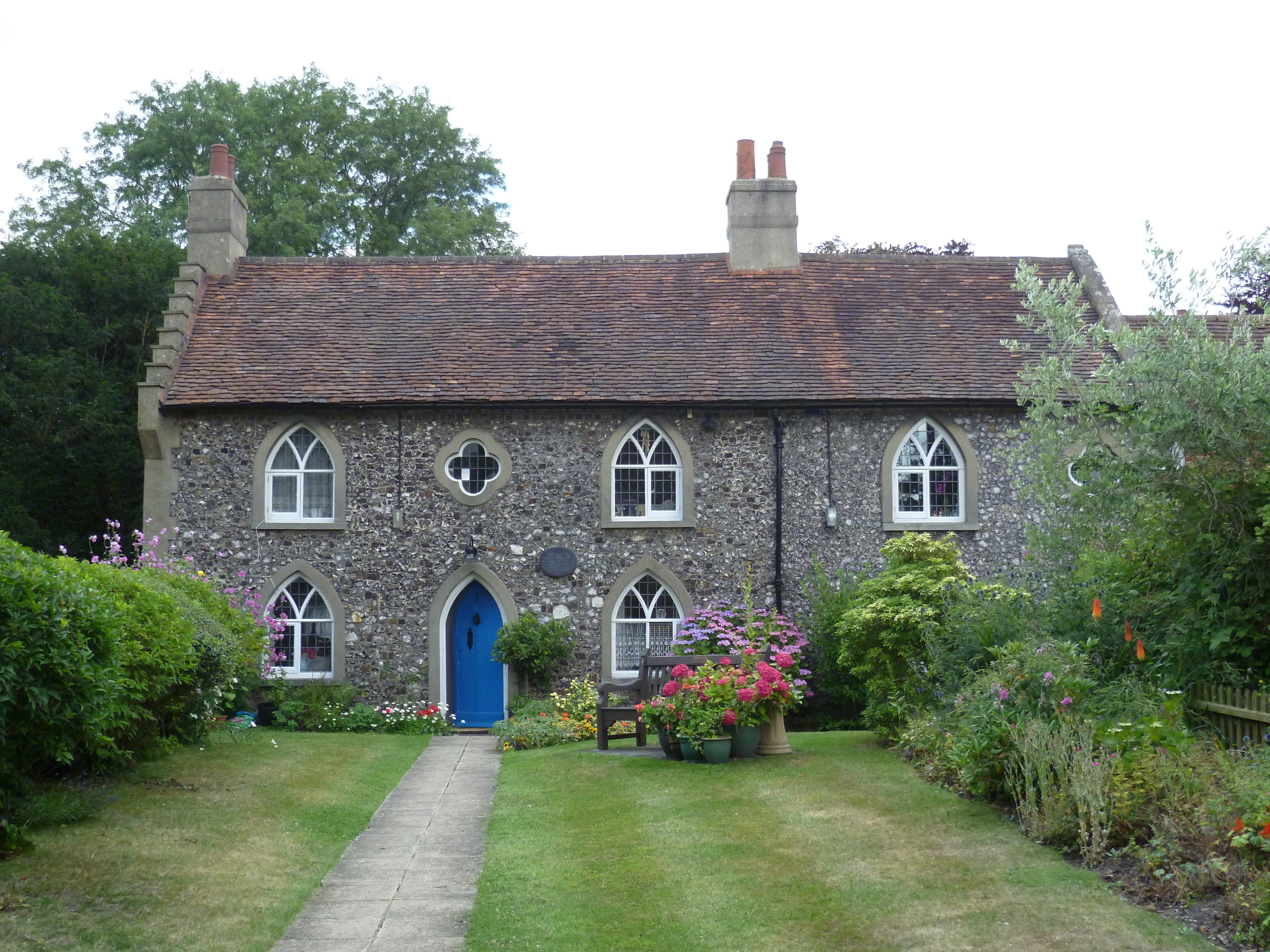
Pagitts Almshouses

Pagitts Almshouses, 1–6 Hadley Green Road, Monken Hadley, in the London Borough of Barnet, are grade II listed buildings. The almshouses are on the north side of the road between St Mary, Monken Hadley church and the Monken Hadley Common Gate House and Gates.

The almshouses were built in the late 18th or early 19th centuries and rebuilt in 1832 by Thorne. Originally with a red brick front, they now have a Gothic facade of flint. A plaque marks the founding of the almshouses in 1678.
