= Thorndon Friars =

Grade II listed house in London

Coordinates: 51.66282°N 0.19804°W

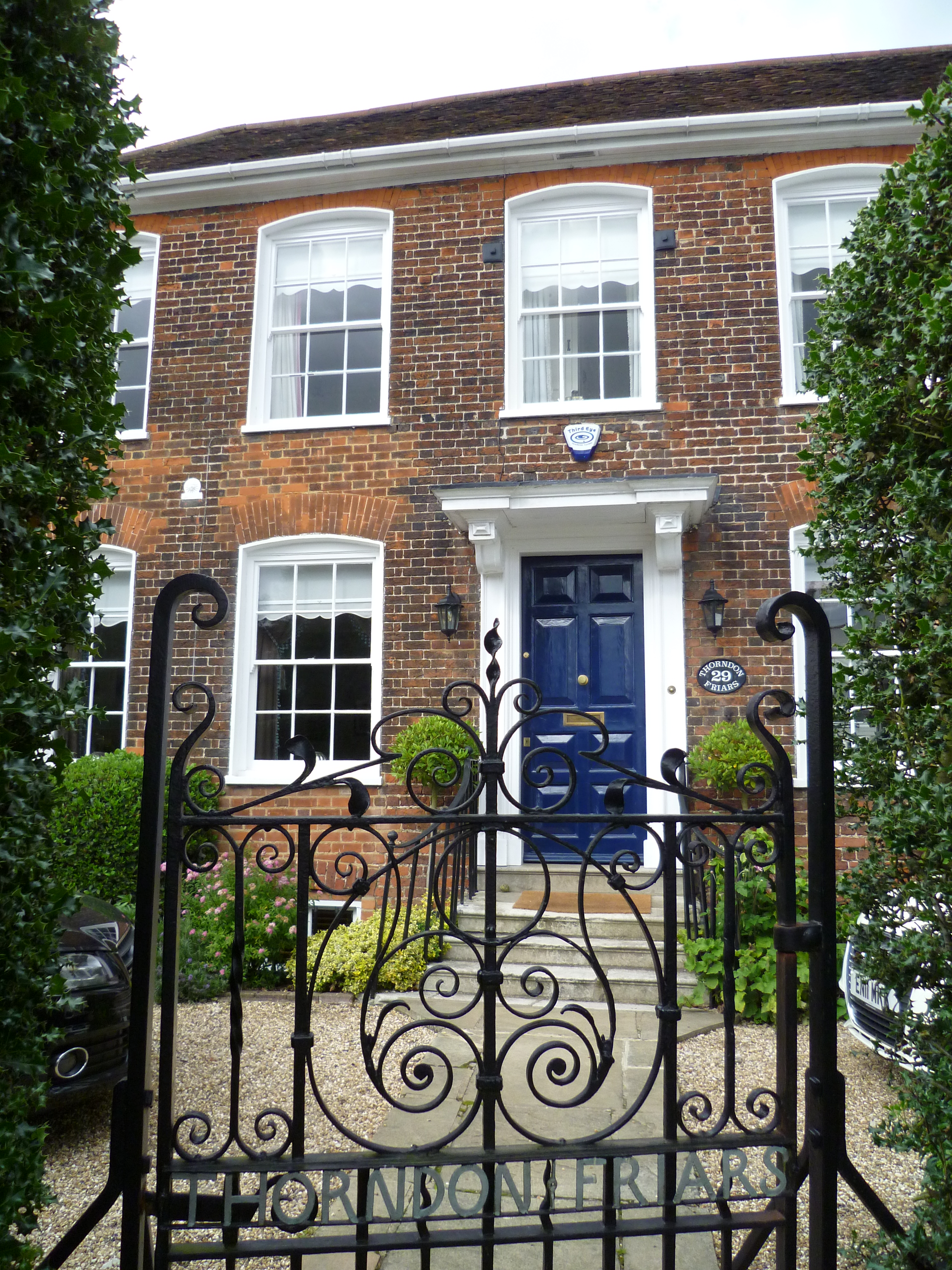
Thorndon Friars

Thorndon Friars is a grade II listed building in Dury Road, Monken Hadley, London Borough of Barnet, England. The house dates from the early 1700s.
