= Livingstone Cottage and Monken Cottage =

Coordinates: 51.6609°N 0.1970°W

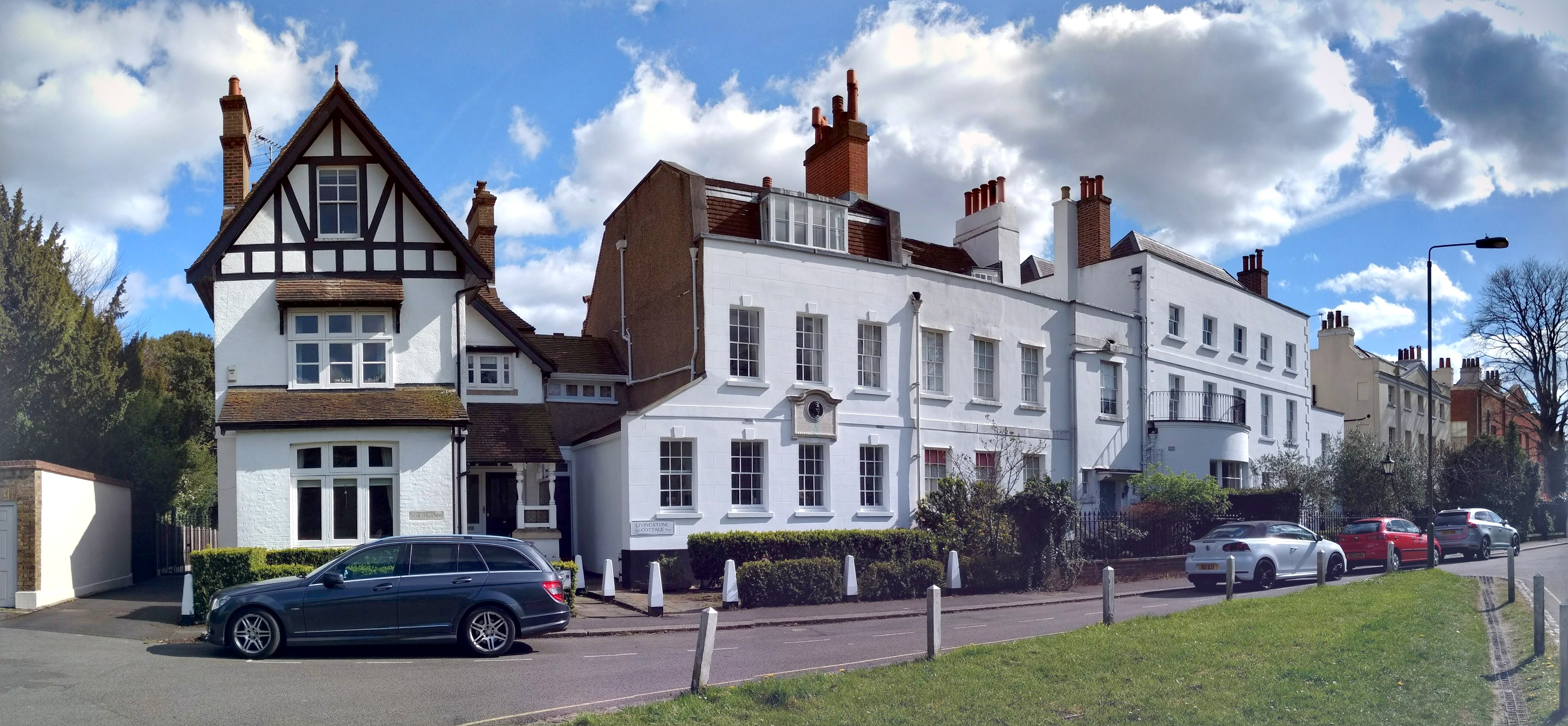
Livingstone Cottage (second from left)

Livingstone Cottage and Monken Cottage are grade II listed buildings on Hadley Green Road facing Hadley Green. A plaque to the front reads, "David Livingstone lived here in the year 1857".
