= Gothic Place =

Coordinates: 51.6630°N 0.1986°W

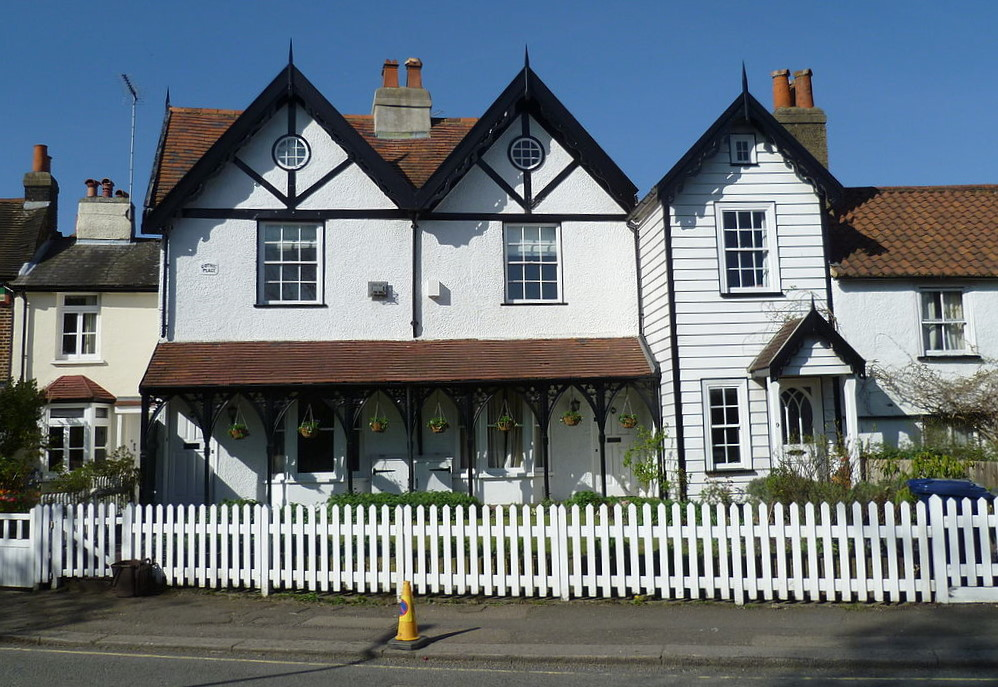
Gothic Place

Gothic Place is a grade II listed house at 5, 7 and 9 Dury Road, Monken Hadley, England.
