= Beacon House and Grove Cottage =

Buildings in Barnet, London, England

Coordinates: 51.6618°N 0.1941°W

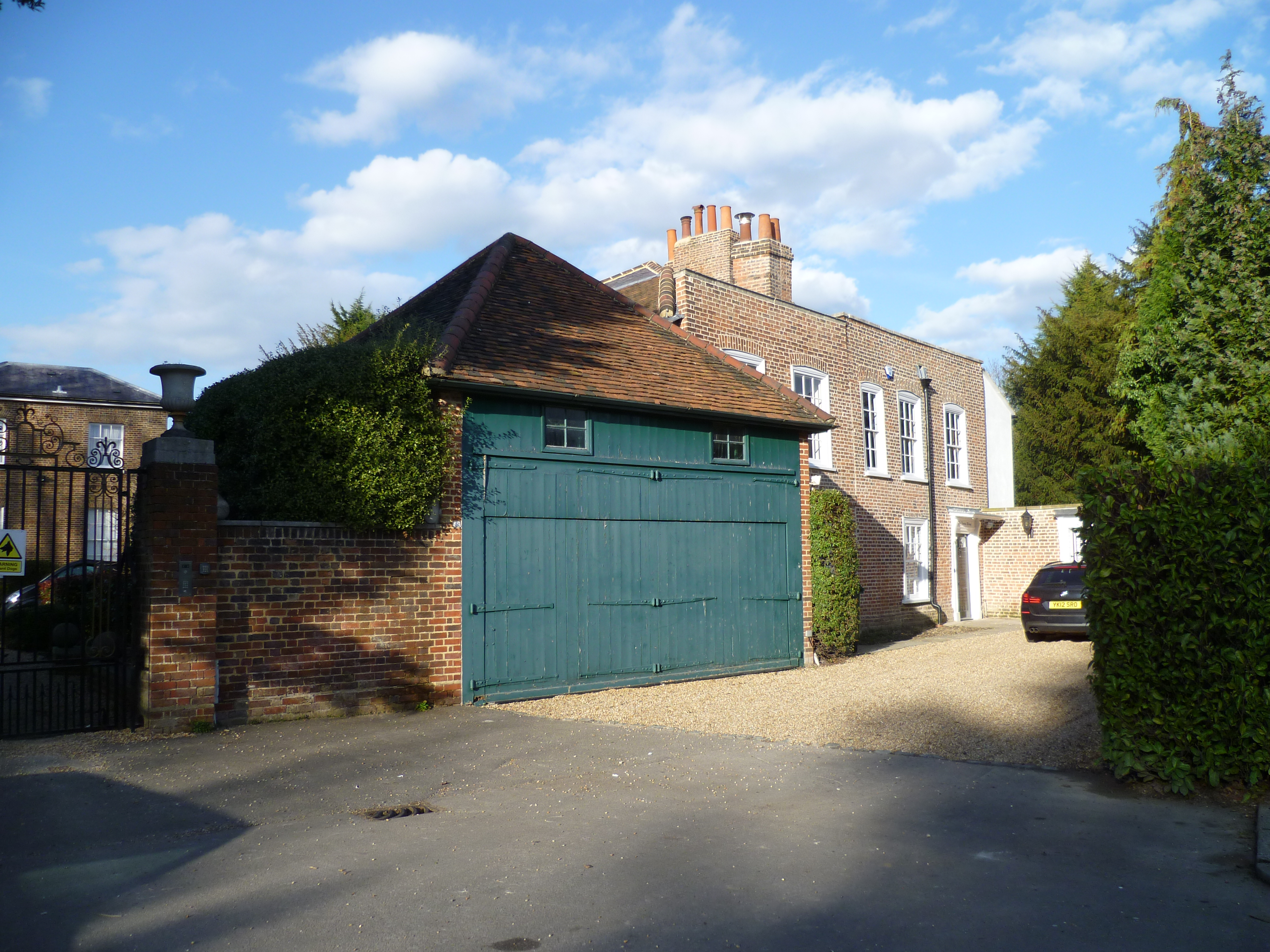
Grove Cottage (centre) and Beacon House (right)

Beacon House and Grove Cottage are grade II listed buildings in Hadley Green Road, Monken Hadley.

Beacon House is an eight-bedroom part timber-framed house built between the late 17th and early 18th centuries extending to approximately 5,000 square feet.
