= Fairholt, Hadley Green =

Historic house in London

Coordinates: 51°39′38″N 0°11′50″W

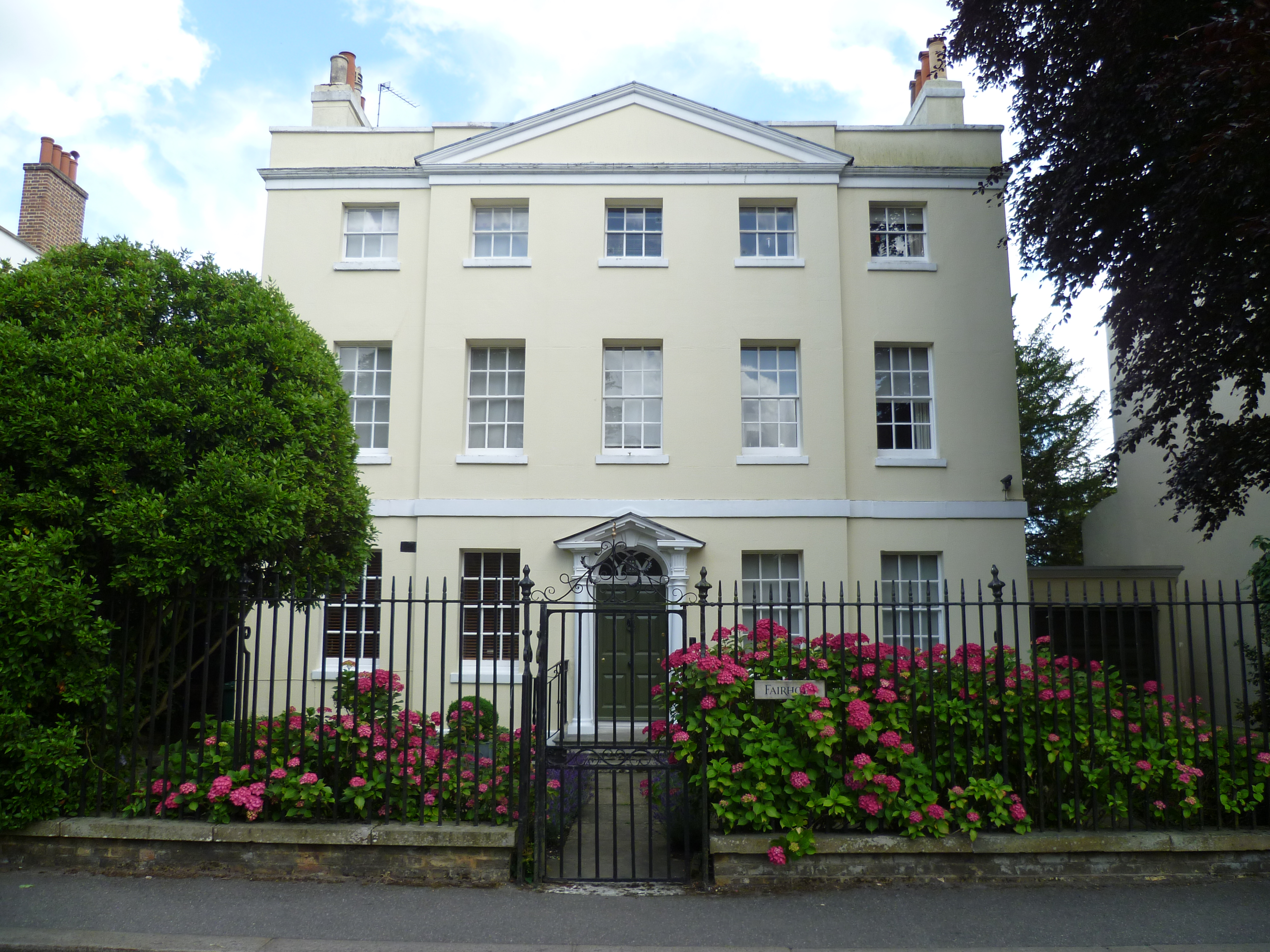
Fairholt

Fairholt is a grade II listed building on Hadley Green Road facing Hadley Green in the London Borough of Barnet. The house dates from around 1750. The gate and railings to the front of the house, which date from the late nineteenth century, are also listed. The house was used as a filming location for the 1970 film The Man Who Haunted Himself, featured as the home of the principal character Harold Pelham, played by Roger Moore.
