= Pymlicoe House =

House in Barnet, London, England

Coordinates: 51.6602°N 0.2015°W

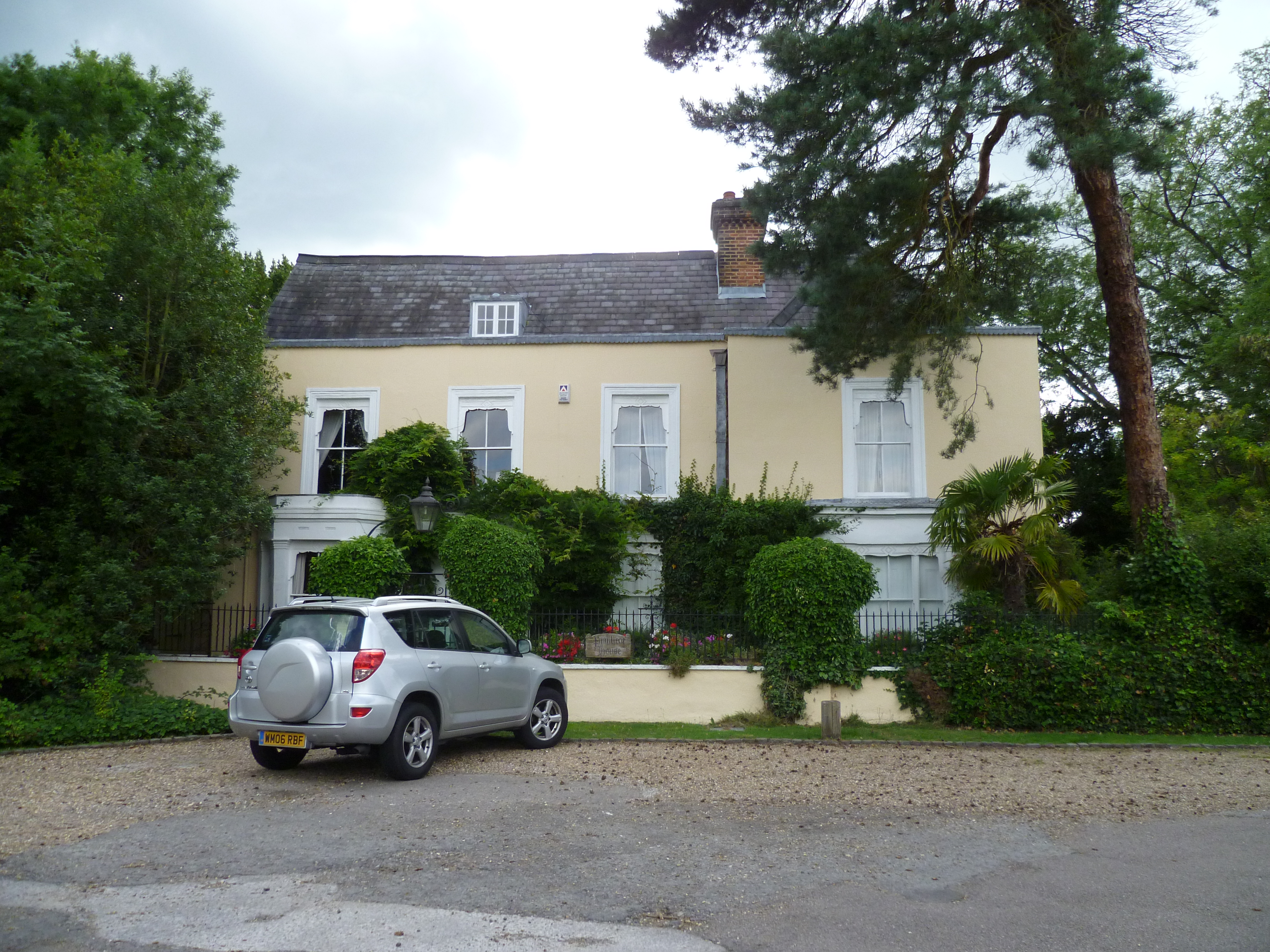
Pymlicoe House

Pymlicoe House is a grade II listed house in Hadley Green West, Monken Hadley, in the London Borough of Barnet. The house dates from the later 18th century and was probably stuccoed in the mid 19th century.

== See also ==
- Hadley Green
