= Hadley Bourne =

Historic building in Monken Hadley, England

Coordinates: 51.6621°N 0.1963°W

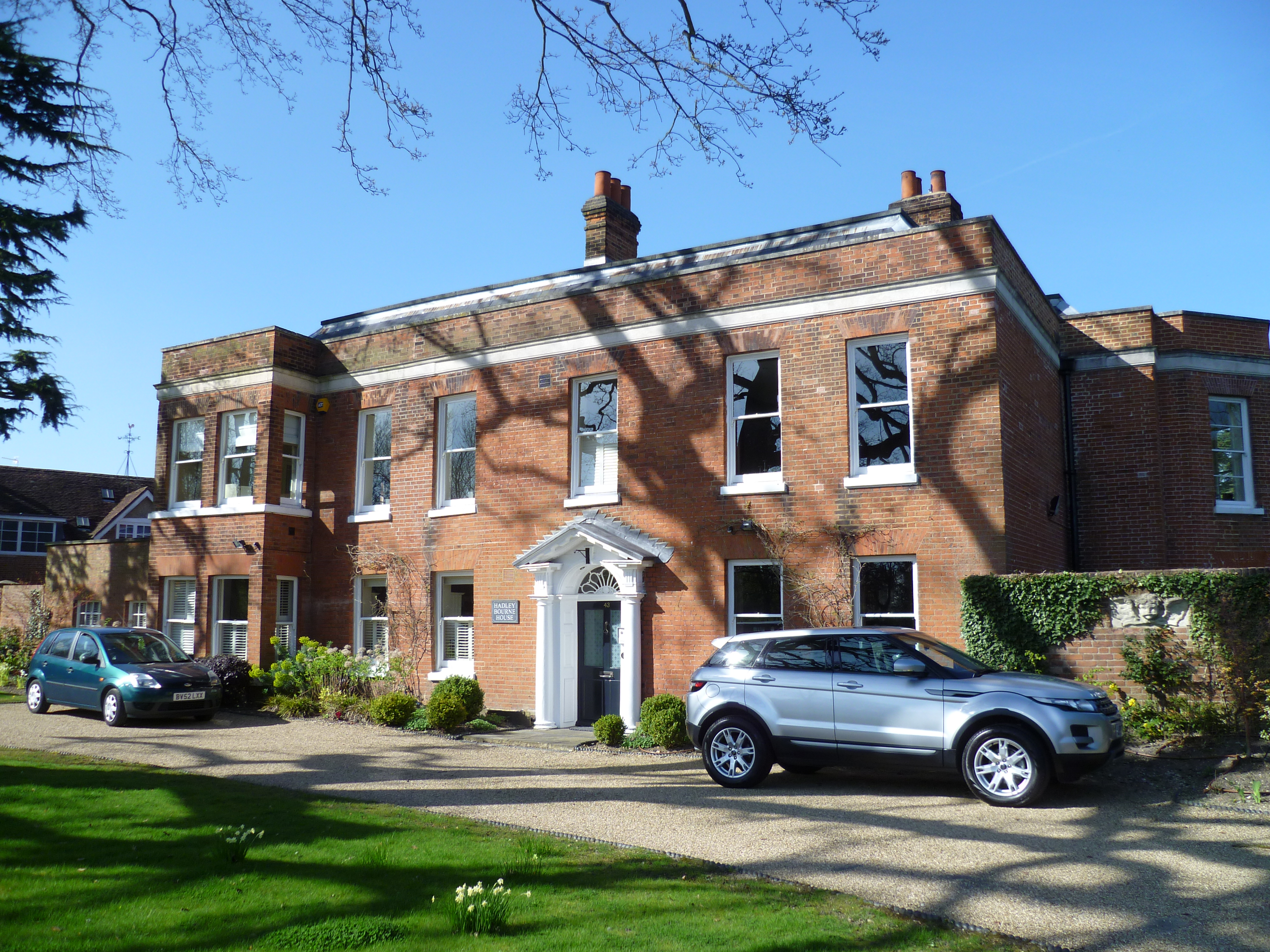
Hadley Bourne

Hadley Bourne is a grade II listed building in Dury Road, Monken Hadley, Barnet, London, England.
