= Ossulston House =

Grade II listed building in Hadley Green Road, Hadley, England

Coordinates: 51.6586°N 0.2001°W

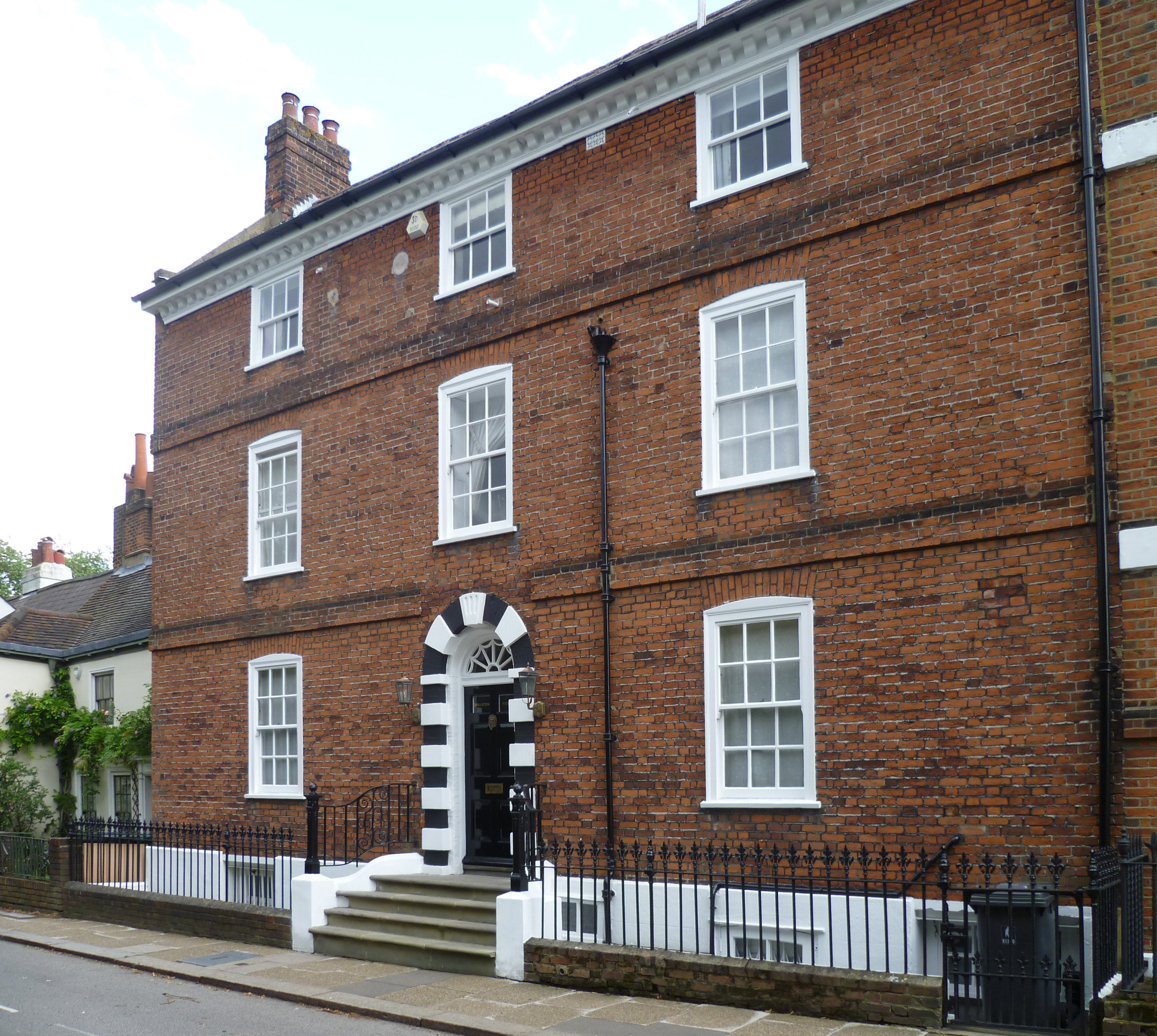
- Interactive map of the Ossulston House area

General information
- Architectural style: Georgian
- Classification: Grade II
- Location: Hadley, London
- Estimated completion: 1764

Ossulston House is a Grade II listed building opposite Joslin's Pond in Hadley Green Road, Hadley, to the north of Chipping Barnet. It is one of what was an almost complete line of houses between Chipping Barnet and Monken Hadley along the east side of Hadley Green which were built in the 18th and 19th centuries as wealthy merchants from London populated the area.

== History ==
The house was built soon after 1764 by sugar refiner John Horton on the site of the Rose and Crown inn and acquired in 1786 by William Makepeace Thackeray, grandfather of the novelist of the same name, who is buried in nearby St Mary the Virgin church.

It was once owned by the Earl of Tankerville who used it when he was visiting from his country home of Chillingham Castle in Northumberland. The Earls also held the title of Baron Ossulston, after the Hundred of Ossulston.

The certificate issued in 1858 as a result of the case of Monro v. Proctor, in respect of monies paid when a railway was driven through Monken Hadley Common, shows the owners of Ossulston House (1) to have been the Trustees of Conference Hall, Mildmay Park, and of Ossulston House (2) to have been W. Joslin. Both in the occupation of the Earl of Tankerville.

The house may have been used as a nursing home. Around 1965, it was occupied by Mr. and Mrs. Keith Chapman.

== Architecture ==
The house is of red brick with stringcourses at storey height, three bays, and a rusticated Gibbs surround to the semicircular-headed doorway. Iron railings at the front are broken by a four-step stairway to the front door, on each side of which are small leaded stained glass windows with avian designs. It is Grade II listed with Historic England.

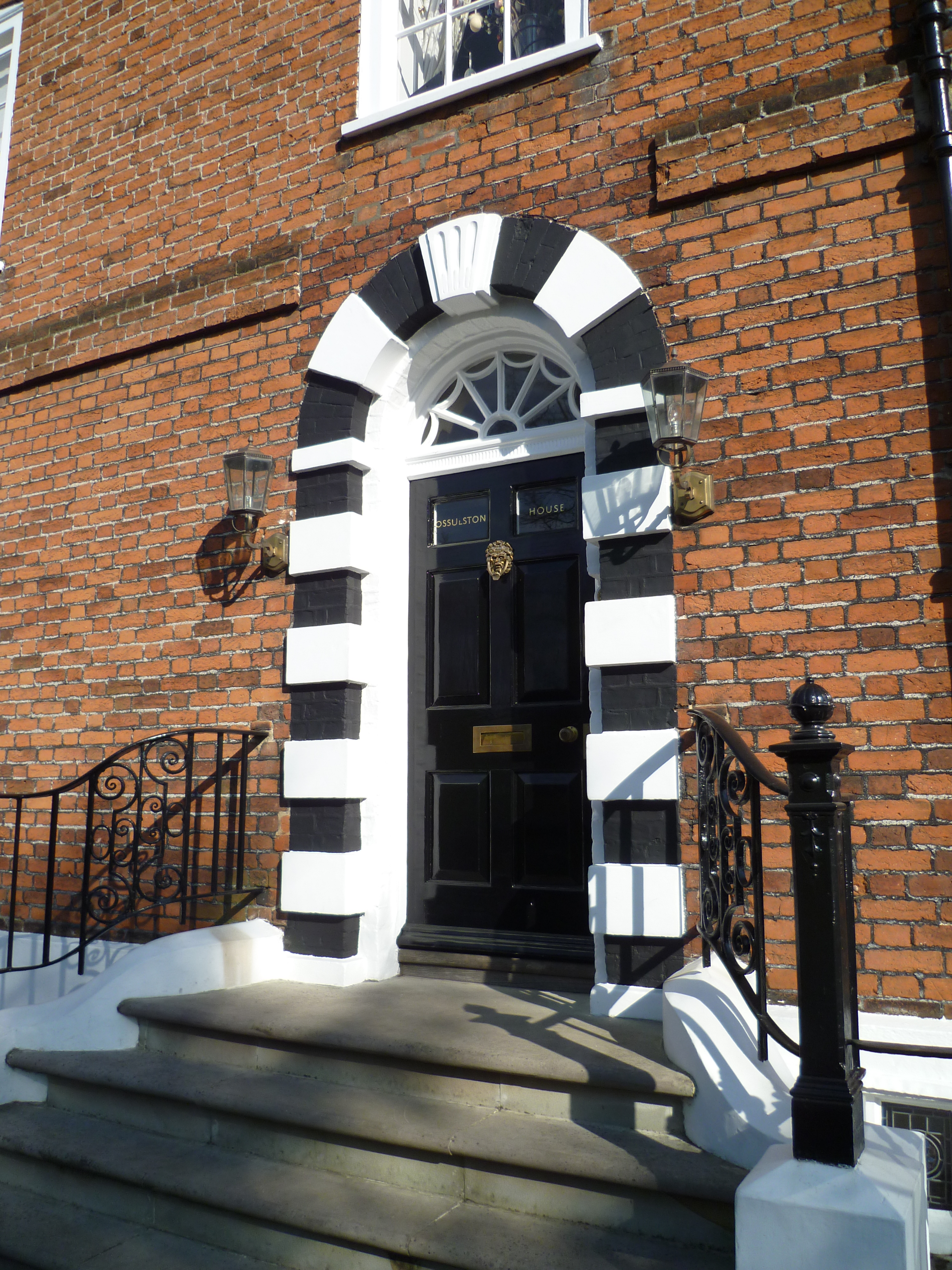
Ossulston House entrance

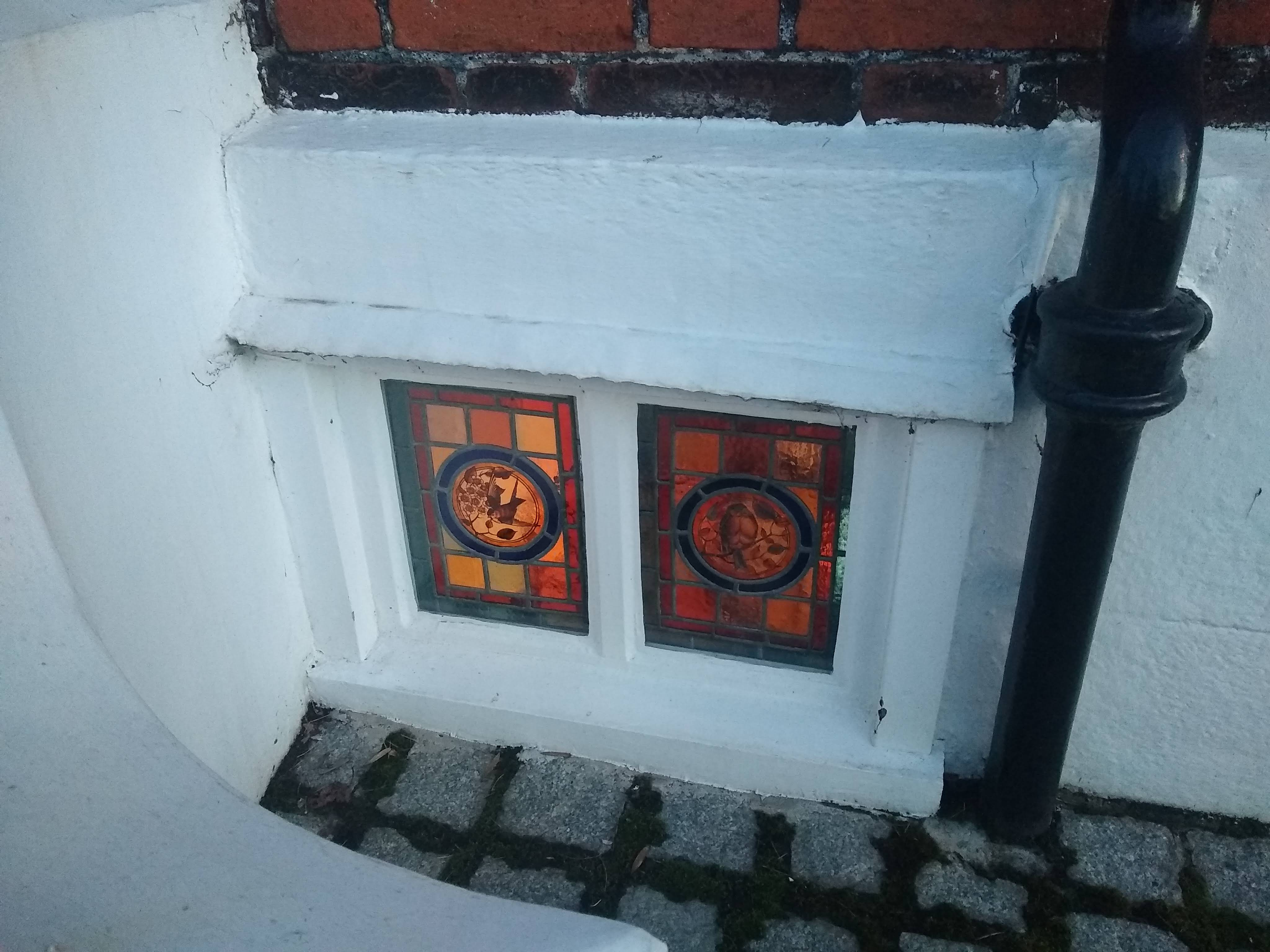
Stained glass window adjacent to the entrance

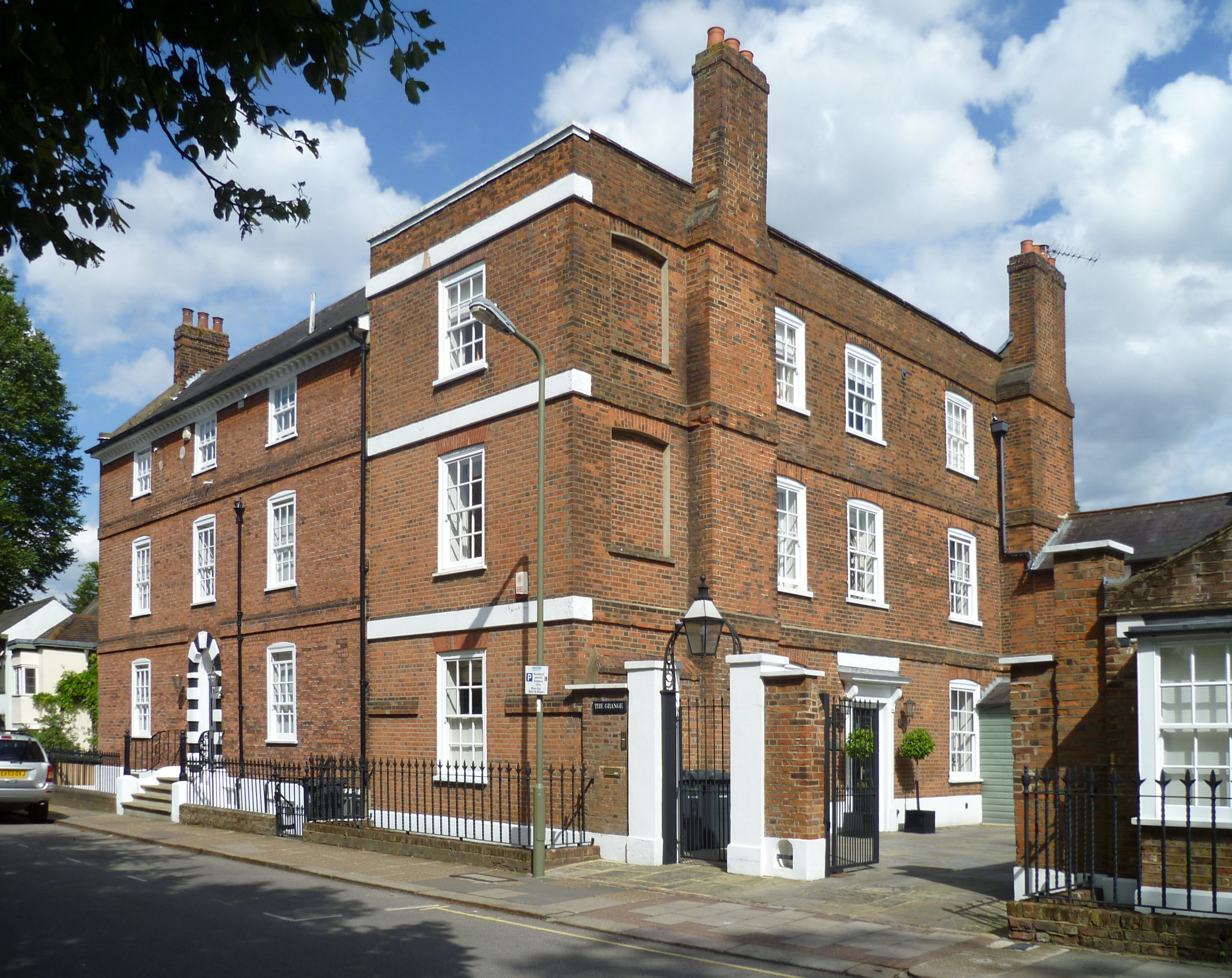
The Grange (right) with Ossulston House to the left

Immediately adjacent to Ossulston House at right angles is the Grade II listed The Grange with three "blind" windows facing the street.
