= Stoberry Lodge =

19th-century house in London

Coordinates: 51.66231°N 0.19708°W

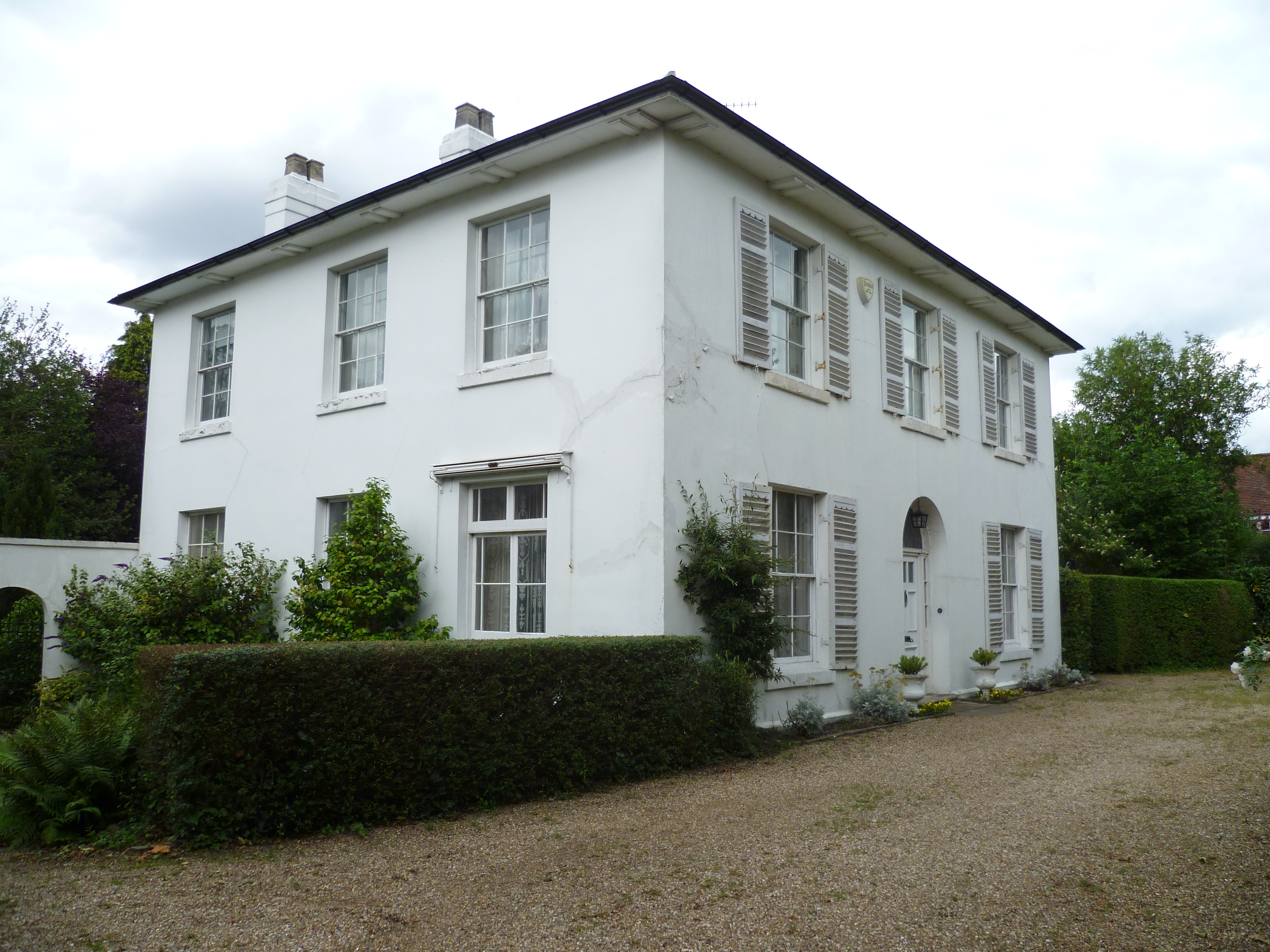
Stoberry Lodge

Stoberry Lodge is a grade II listed house in Dury Road, Monken Hadley, London Borough of Barnet, England. The house dates from around 1830.
