= Hadley Cote & The Old Cottage =

Coordinates: 51.6587°N 0.1999°W

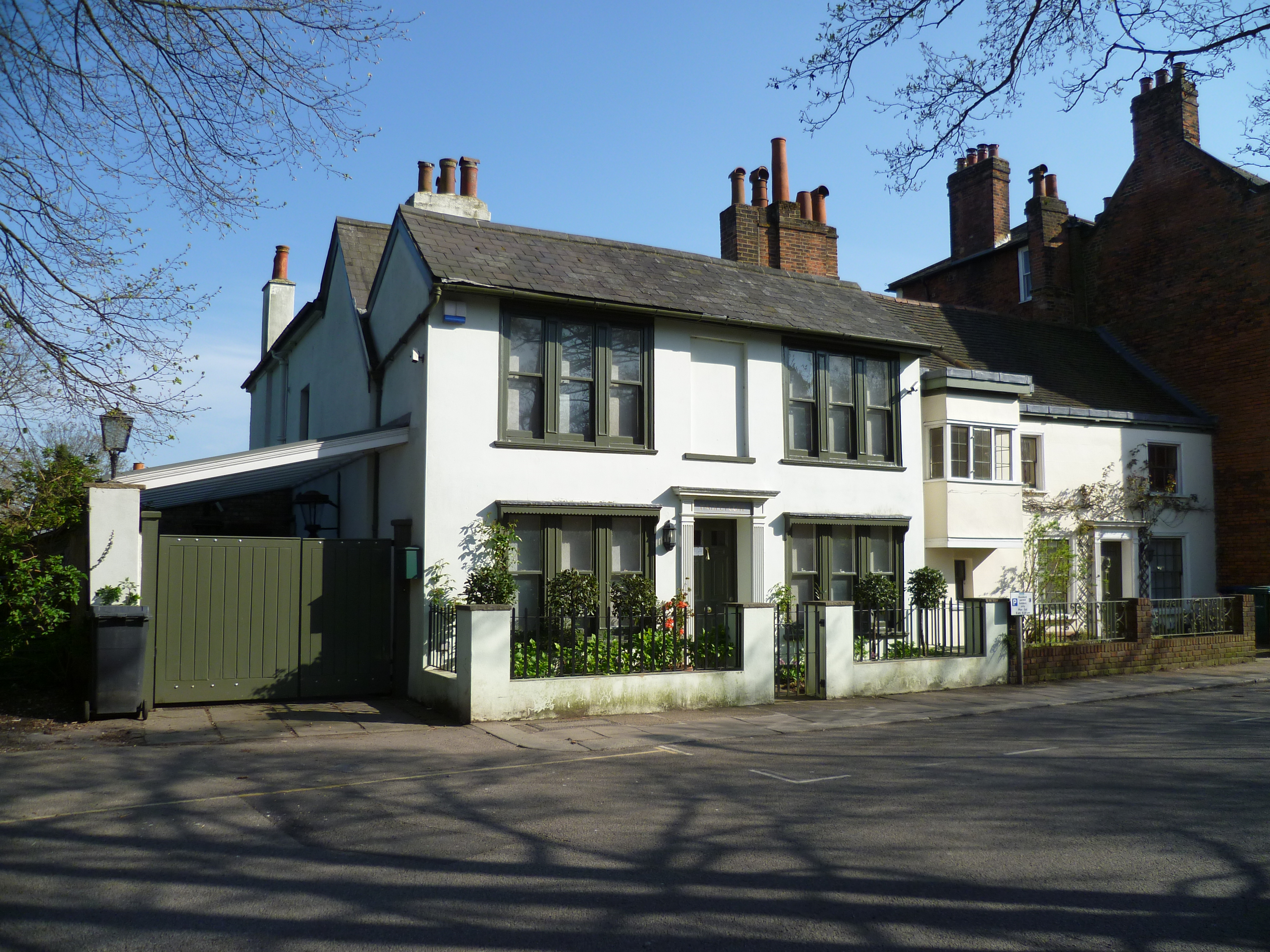
Hadley Cote with The Old Cottage on the right.

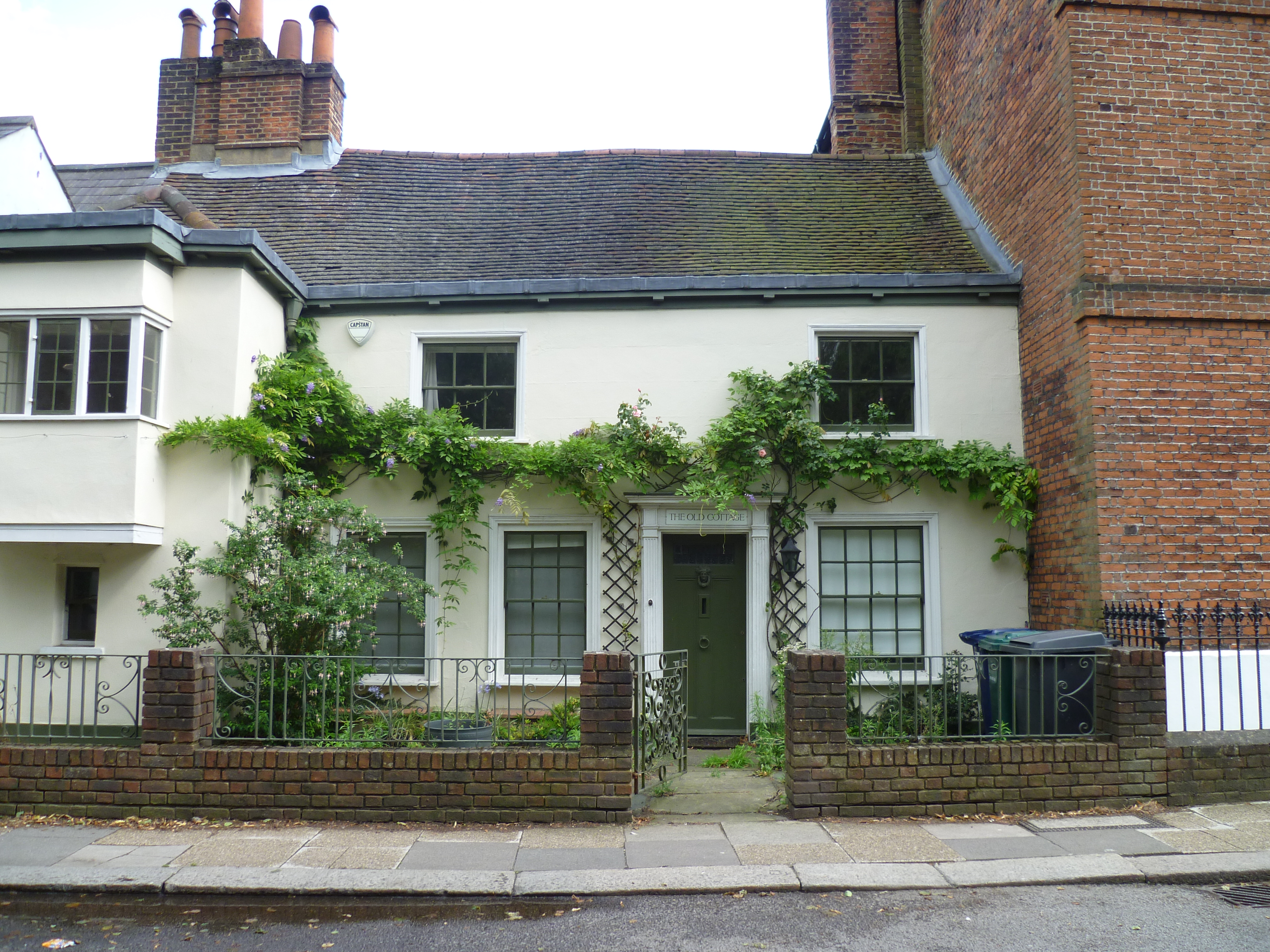
The Old Cottage

Hadley Cote & The Old Cottage are grade II listed buildings on Hadley Green Road to the north of Chipping Barnet.
