= Hadley, London =

Area in London, England

Coordinates: 51.65°N 0.20°W

Hadley

- Location within Greater London
- London borough: Barnet
- Ceremonial county: Greater London
- Region: London
- Country: England
- Sovereign state: United Kingdom
- Police: Metropolitan
- Fire: London
- Ambulance: London
- London Assembly: Barnet and Camden

Boundaries of Hadley civil parish (to the south-west of Monken Hadley) in 1894

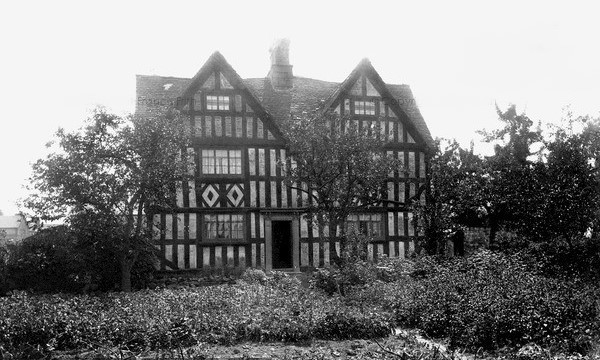
Hadley Manor, 1901.

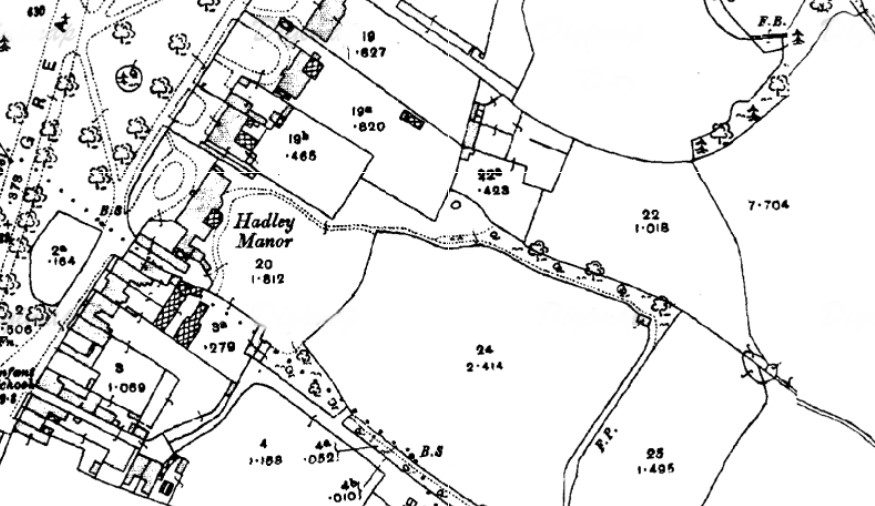
Hadley Manor on a 1910s map.

Hadley is a district of the London Borough of Barnet between Chipping Barnet in the south and Monken Hadley in the north. It was formerly a civil parish of Barnet Urban District. The parish was formed in 1894 from the part of the parish of Monken Hadley in Barnet Urban District. On 1 April 1965 the parish was abolished. At the 1951 census (one of the last before the abolition of the parish), Hadley had a population of 362.

Hadley includes Hadley Green which is bisected by the Great North Road and includes Hadley Green Road, and a number of grade II listed houses on the east side such as Ossulston House and The Grange.

Hadley manor house stood on the eastern side of Hadley Green Road. It was purchased in 1890 by the milliners Rhoda Wyburn and her sister Emily from Julia Hyde, widow of Henry Hyde of Ely Place, Holborn. It was destroyed by fire in the early 1930s and the site purchased by East Barnet council in 1934 on Rhoda's death. The house was demolished in 1935. At about the same time, Rhoda gave to the public the land known as Hadley Manor Fields to the rear of the manor house which was combined with purchases from adjacent estates such as the Hadley Hurst Estate and Gladsmuir Estate to form King George's Fields which were created to mark the jubilee of King George V. Nothing remains of the manor house today and the site is used as the western entrance to King George's Fields.
