= Hadley Brewery =

Former brewery in Monken Hadley, London, United Kingdom

Hadley Brewery was a now-defunct brewery located in the Monken Hadley neighborhood of London. It stood for many years just north of High Barnet on Hadley Green.

== History ==
Though there is a belief that Hadley Brewery started around 1700, the operation probably started in the later part of the 18th century. Robert and William Thorp were listed as brewers in Hadley in Pigot's Directory (1825). The Brewery was run by a Mr Salisbury in the 1850s, who sold it to W. T. Healey early in 1861, who in turn had the whole reconstructed "at great expence." James Harris Brown purchased the brewery in 1887, and was successful enough to rebuild the whole in 1911, creating the structure that existed into living memory. Shortly before James Harris died the works became a private limited company (Harris Browne Ltd). During the 1930s the brewery owned the Star Tavern (High Barnet), the Victoria (Highgate), and the Bridge House (Potters Bar). Brookman's Park Hotel was planned in 1936 but was not built until after the takeover of the brewery by Fremlin's. The brewery was supplied by its own artesian well, and by 1937 they were brewing approximately 1500 barrels of beer at a cost £12/6s, importing hops from Czechoslovakia. At this time there were approximately fifty employees.

Brewing continued at the location until 1938 when the company was sold to Fremlins. Afterwards, the brewery was only used for storage and distribution. There was a serious fire in 1969 and although much of the brewery was rebuilt, the 18th century buildings did not survive. In 1967 Fremlins was bought out by Whitbread, who closed Hadley Brewery completely, offering the 28 employees work at their new works in Luton. The buildings remained empty until 1978 when the last of the buildings were demolished.

== Products ==
Beers brewed included Hadley Stout, Hadley Special Pale Ale, Dinner Ale, ginger beer, and Nourishing Stout. Twenty to thirty barrels of barley wine (Old English Ale) were made every year and bottled by hand.
