= Hollybush, Monken Hadley =

Coordinates: 51°39′40″N 0°11′48″W

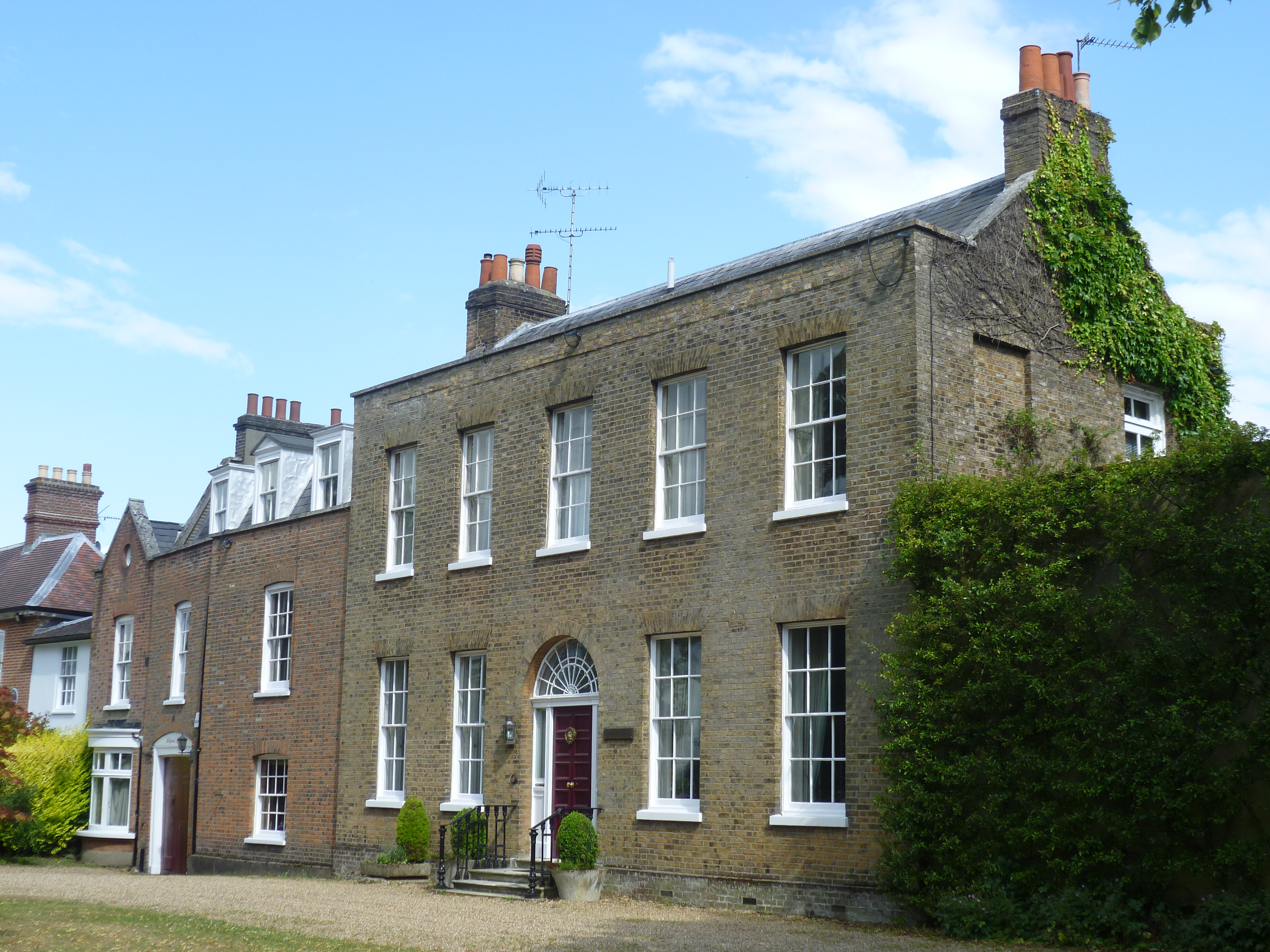
Hollybush

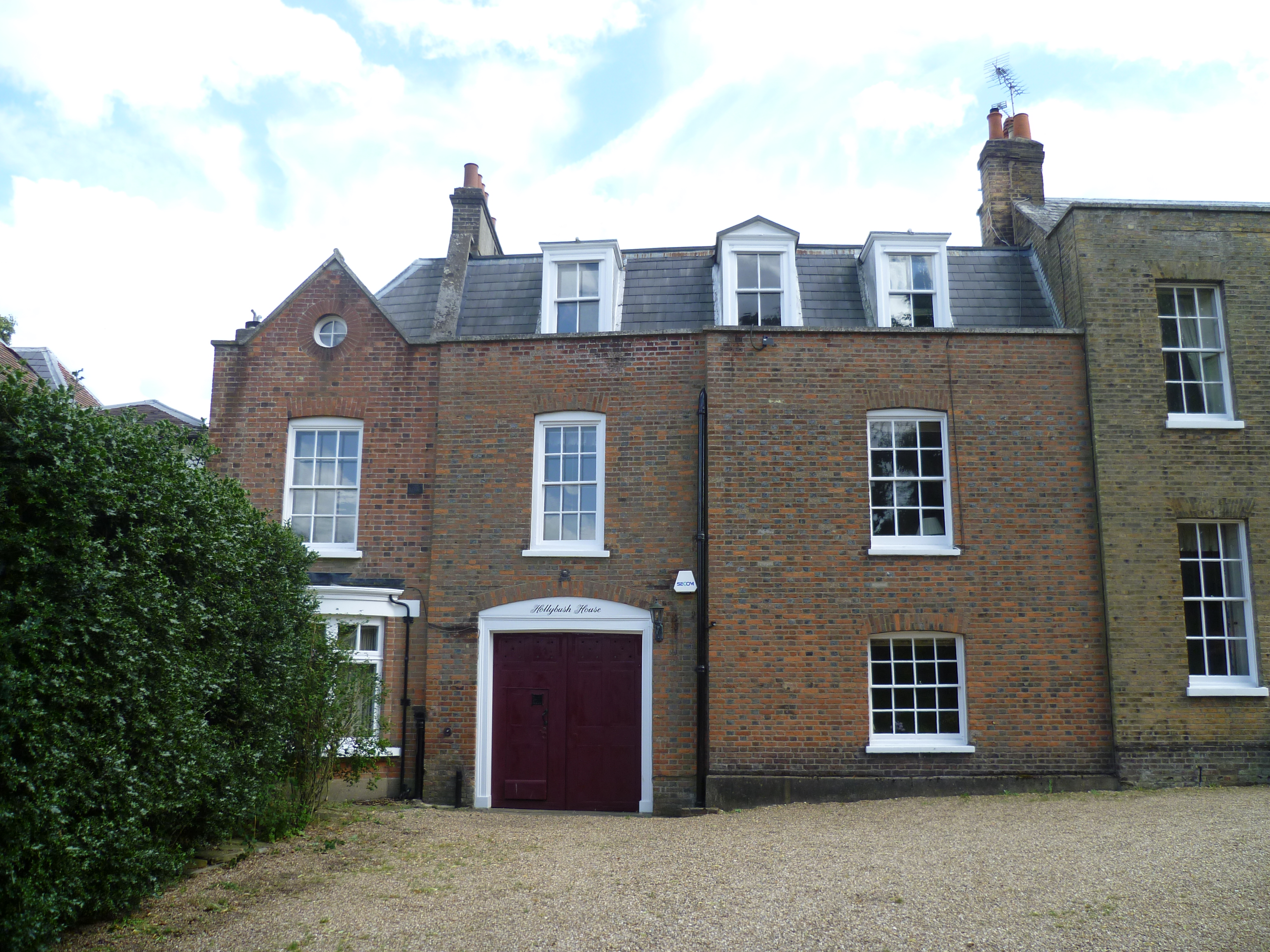
Earlier part adjoining the main house.

Hollybush is a grade II listed building on Hadley Green Road to the north of Chipping Barnet. The main house was built around 1790 and the adjoining small buildings on the left (since altered) even earlier.
