= Hester Pinney =

- Born: 3 July 1658; Broadwindsor
- Died: 19 February 1740 (aged 81); Holborn
- Occupation: businessperson
- Partner: George Booth

Hester Pinney (3 July 1658 at Broadwindsor, Dorset – 19 February 1740), was an English businessperson in partnership with her sister Rachel Pinney. They dealt in lace like her sisters Sarah Pinney and Jane Hoare. Hester was organising outworkers, and later importing sugar from Nevis where her exiled brother Azariah Pinney was making a fortune, owning slaves and dealing in sugar.

== Life ==
Pinney was the eighth of the ten children of the Presbyterian minister and preacher John Pinney (1620/21–1705) and Jane French (1614–1693). When her father was exiled from his church, the family decided to trade in lace. Her sisters Jane Hoare and Sarah Pinney were already trading when Hester moved to London and engaged in trade with her sister Rachel in 1682. They had a lace shop in the Royal Exchange. They sold laces from Devon and yarn from Antwerp, and they arranged the import of yarn which then went to out-workers.

Hester Pinney was particularly noted for her business skill and her ability in successful negotiations. She manage to bribe officials to allow her brother who had been involved with the Monmouth Rebellion to escape punishment. He was smuggled abroad and ended up in Nevis with £15 to his name. He dealt there in lace and sugar. She imported sugar from the West Indies, started a lace-making school and lent money for interest as a banker. Her contribution to the family business made the entire family wealthy.

After the death of her father in 1705, she also successfully engaged in speculation, and her business became more independent. She is noted to have been a significant member of the London business world. It was unusual for an unmarried woman of her time period to achieve such a position. Pinney never married, which would have placed her under the legal guardianship of her husband, but she had a long-term relationship with the lawyer, George Booth, while employed as his secretary. They had no children. Booth was known for his corruption while working for the customs. He was unseated as an MP after it was realised that he had bribed his way into that role as well.

When George Booth died in 1726 she had been living in the same house for three years. She was his only executor. He left her property in West Ham and Houndsditch and the manor of Monken Hadley twelve miles outside London.

== Death and legacy ==
Hester died on 19 February 1740 in Holborn and she was buried in St Mary the Virgin, Monken Hadley. She left a sizable inheritance to her sister Rachel, her nephew Azariah, and John Frederick Pinney who was a great nephew from Nevis who was already rich due to the Pinney plantation there. Some of her letters and Pinney account books are held by Bristol University Library.
