= The Chase, Hadley Common =

Coordinates: 51°39′35″N 0°11′27″W

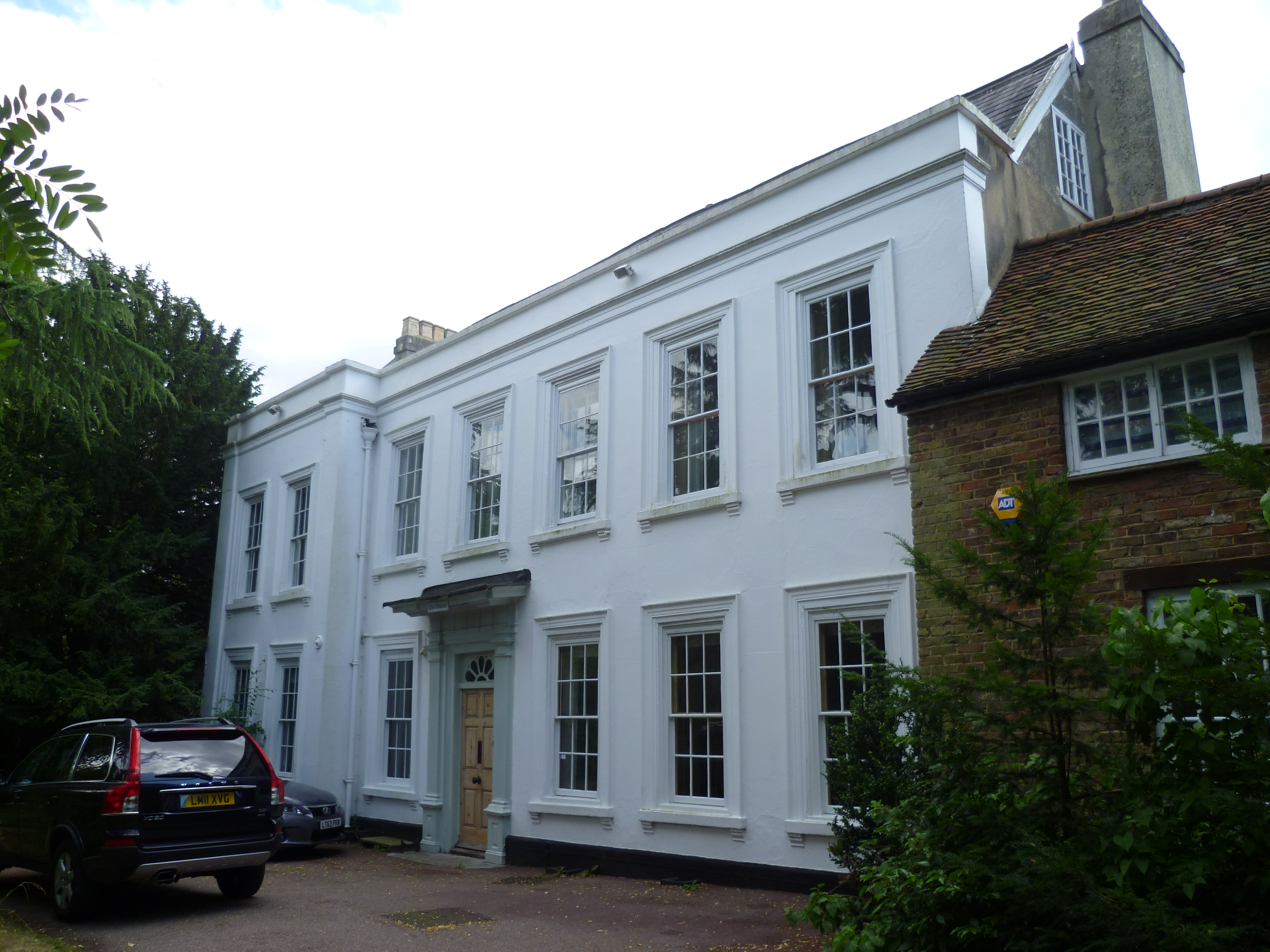
The Chase

The Chase is a grade II listed building on Hadley Common road to the north of Chipping Barnet.
