= Old Fold Manor Golf Club House =

House in Barnet, London, England

Coordinates: 51.6639°N 0.2009°W

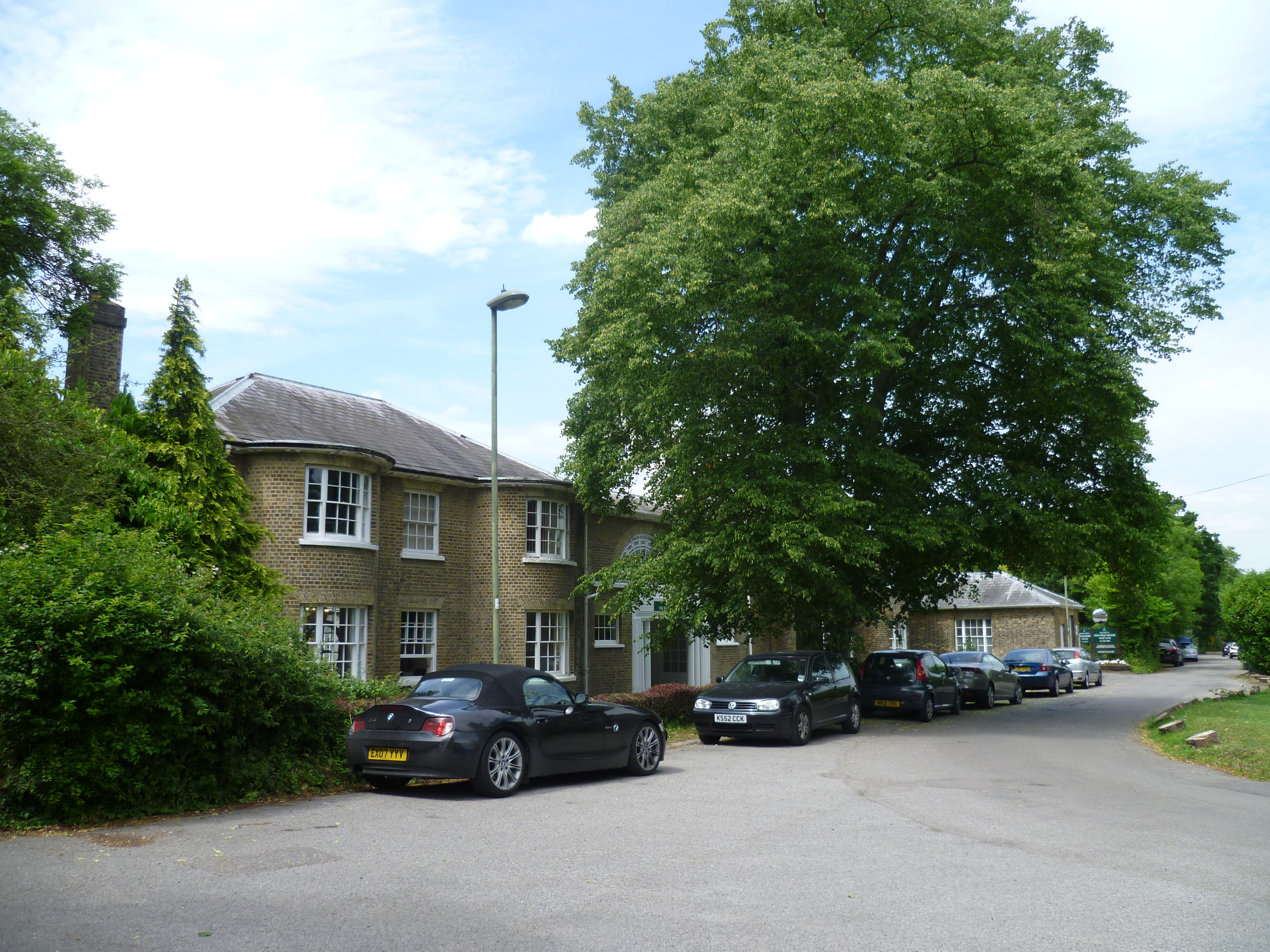
Old Fold Manor Golf Club Monken Hadley

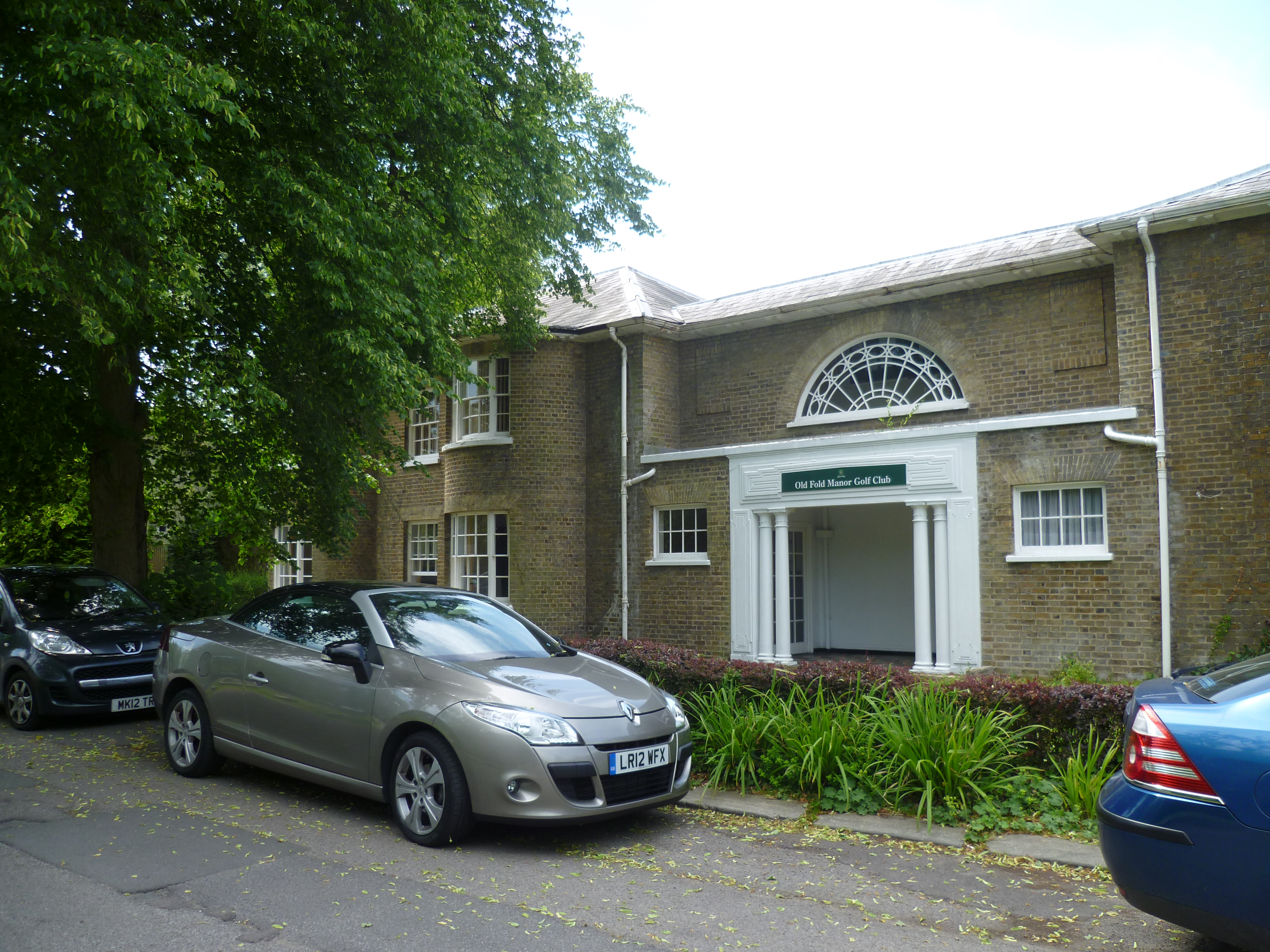
Old Fold Manor Golf Club Monken Hadley

Old Fold Manor Golf Club House, in the London Borough of Barnet, is a grade II listed building.

Old Fold Manor was founded in 1910 by Viscount Enfield. The club is believed to have been built on the battleground of the Battle of Barnet.
