= Anyho =

Building in Barnet, London, England

Coordinates: 51.6599°N 0.1910°W

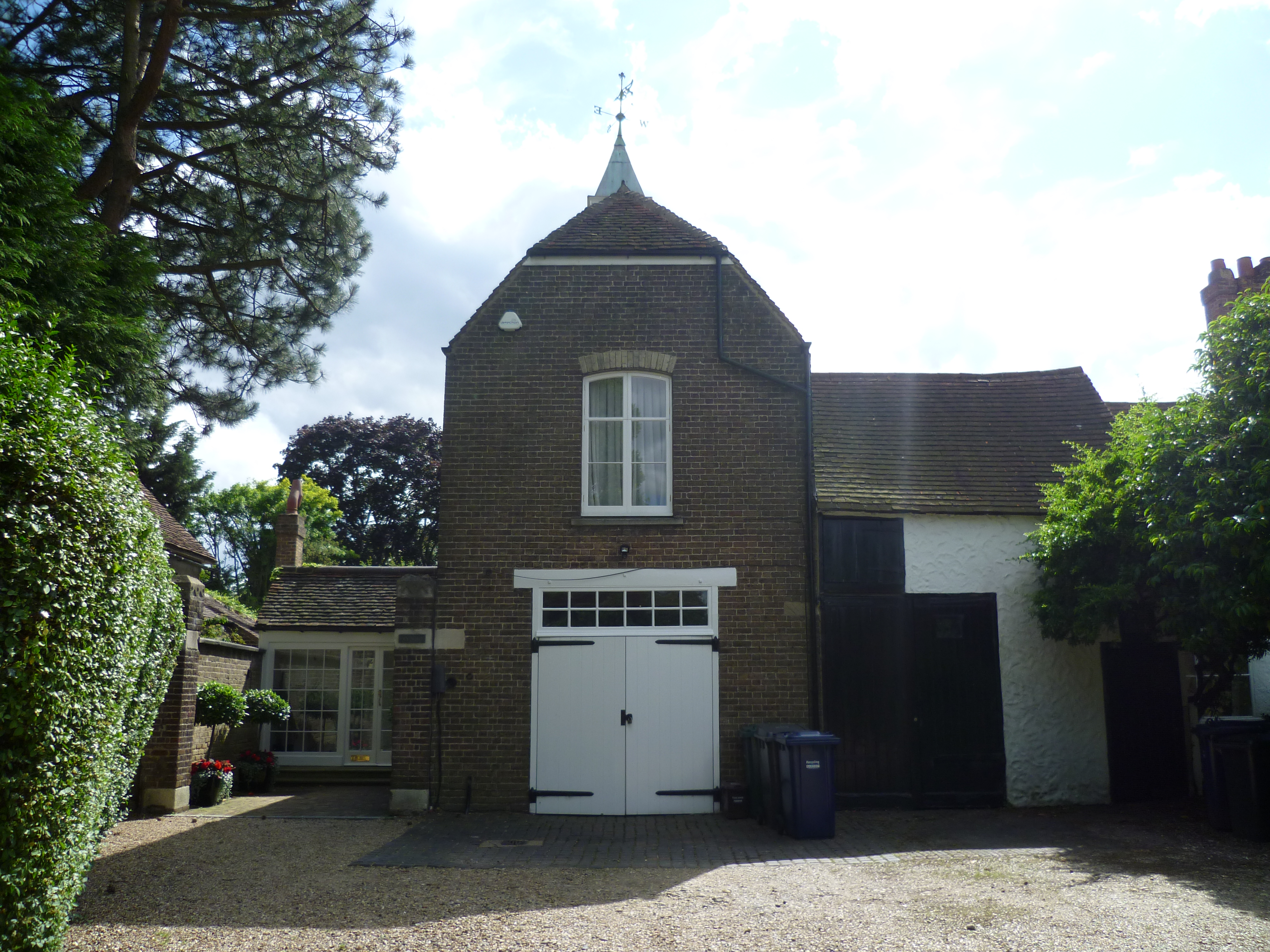
Anyho

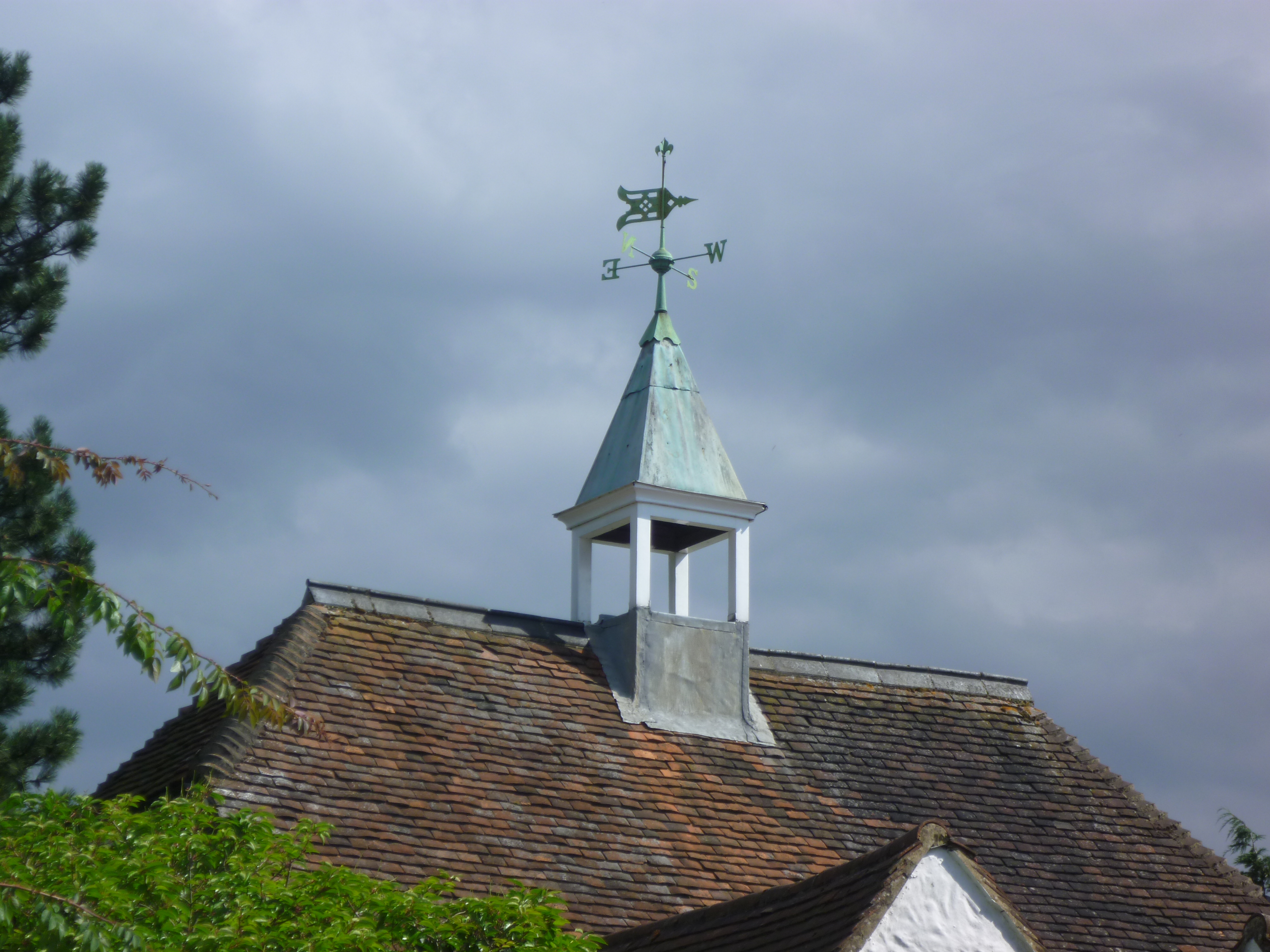
Weather vane on Anyho

Anyho is a grade II listed building on Hadley Common road facing Monken Hadley Common.
