= Gate House and Gate, Monken Hadley =

Building in London, England

Coordinates: 51°39′40″N 0°11′38″W

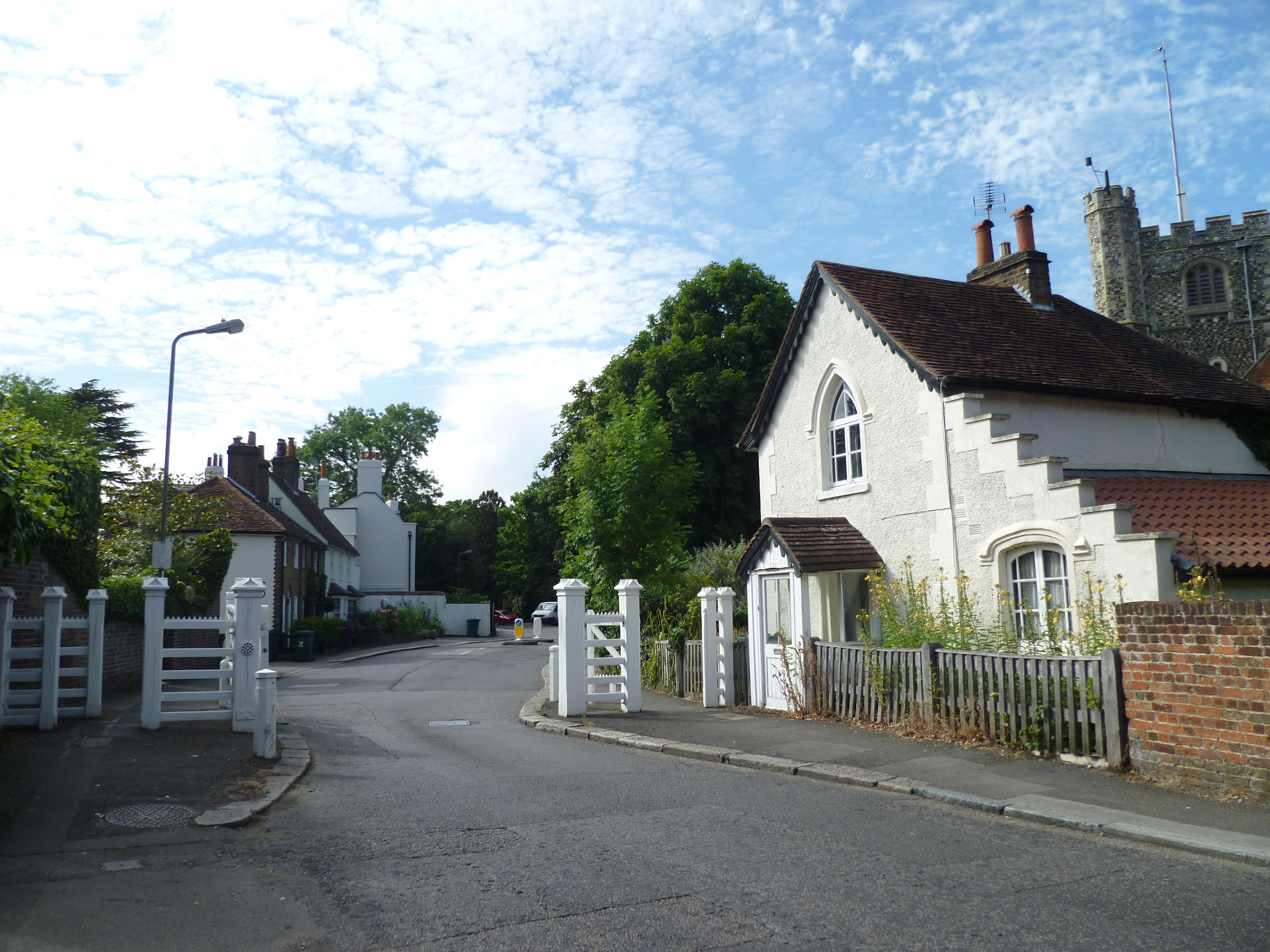
The Gate House and Gate looking west towards the village.

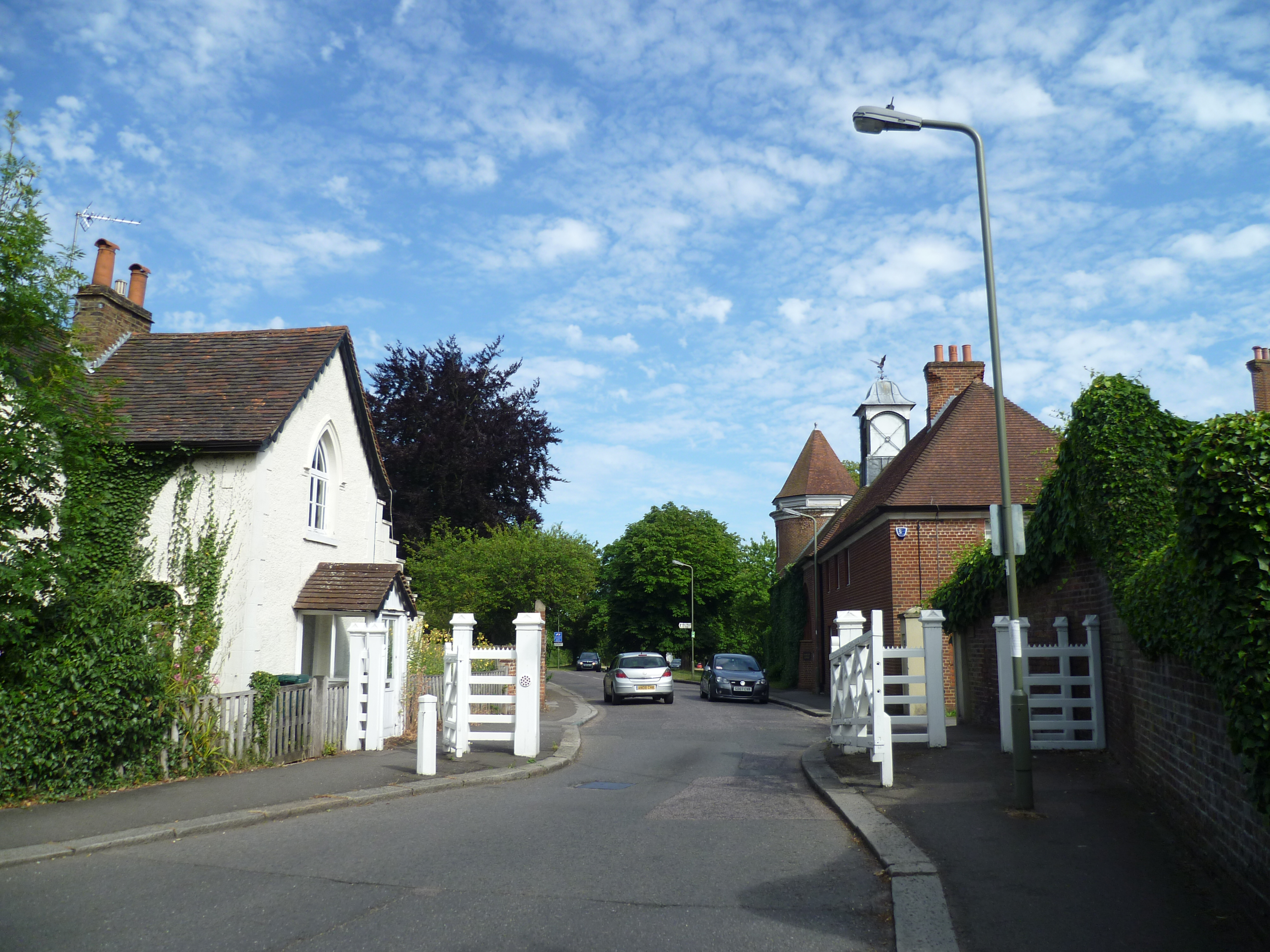
The Gate House and Gate looking east towards the common.

The Gate House and Gate, Monken Hadley, in the London Borough of Barnet, are grade II listed buildings The house is in the Gothic style, early nineteenth century. The gates are of timber and are one of a number of white timber gates that mark the main access points to Monken Hadley Common.
