= Hadley Green =

Nature reserve in Barnet, London, United Kingdom

Coordinates: 51.661°N 0.199°W

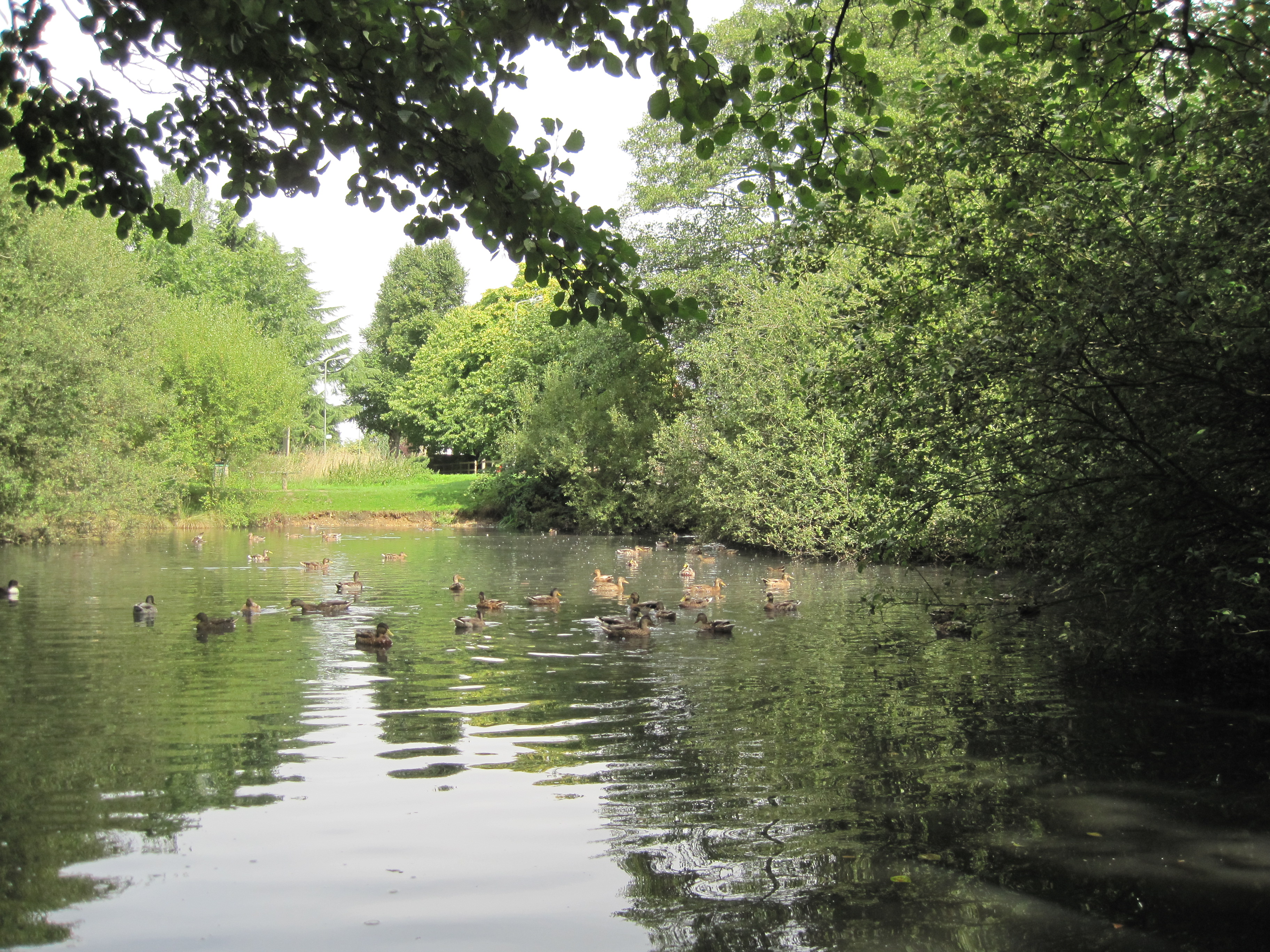
Joslin's Pond in Hadley Green

Hadley Green is a 10-hectare (25-acre) Site of Metropolitan Importance for Nature Conservation in Hadley in the London Borough of Barnet. The reserve straddles the Great North Road between Hadley Green Road and Fold Lane.

== Environment ==
It is an area of acid grassland interspersed with trees, and has several ponds. The acid grassland, ditches and ponds have several regionally rare species of plants, and the invertebrate fauna include eleven species of dragonflies and damselflies.

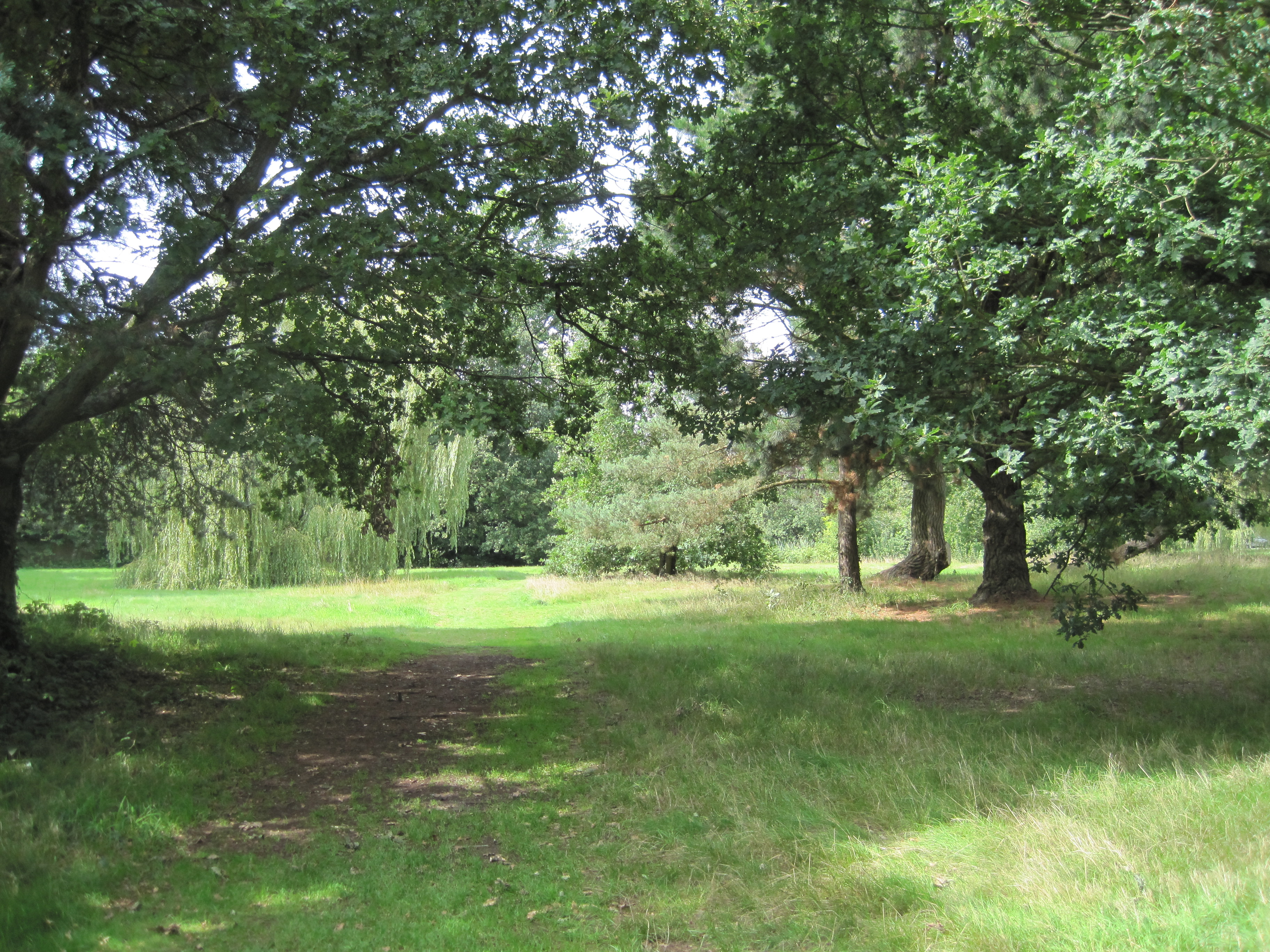
Hadley Green

== History ==
It is reputedly the site of a decisive battle in the Wars of the Roses, the Battle of Barnet in 1471. The land is a traditional village common and was grazed by villagers' animals for hundreds of years until the 20th century. It was secured for the people of Hadley parish as public open space in 1818.

The London Loop long distance walk goes through the reserve, and it adjoins King George's Fields.

== See also ==
- Barnet parks and open spaces
- Nature reserves in Barnet
