= Monken Hadley =

Area of the London Borough of Barnet, England

Coordinates: 51.6624°N 0.1990°W

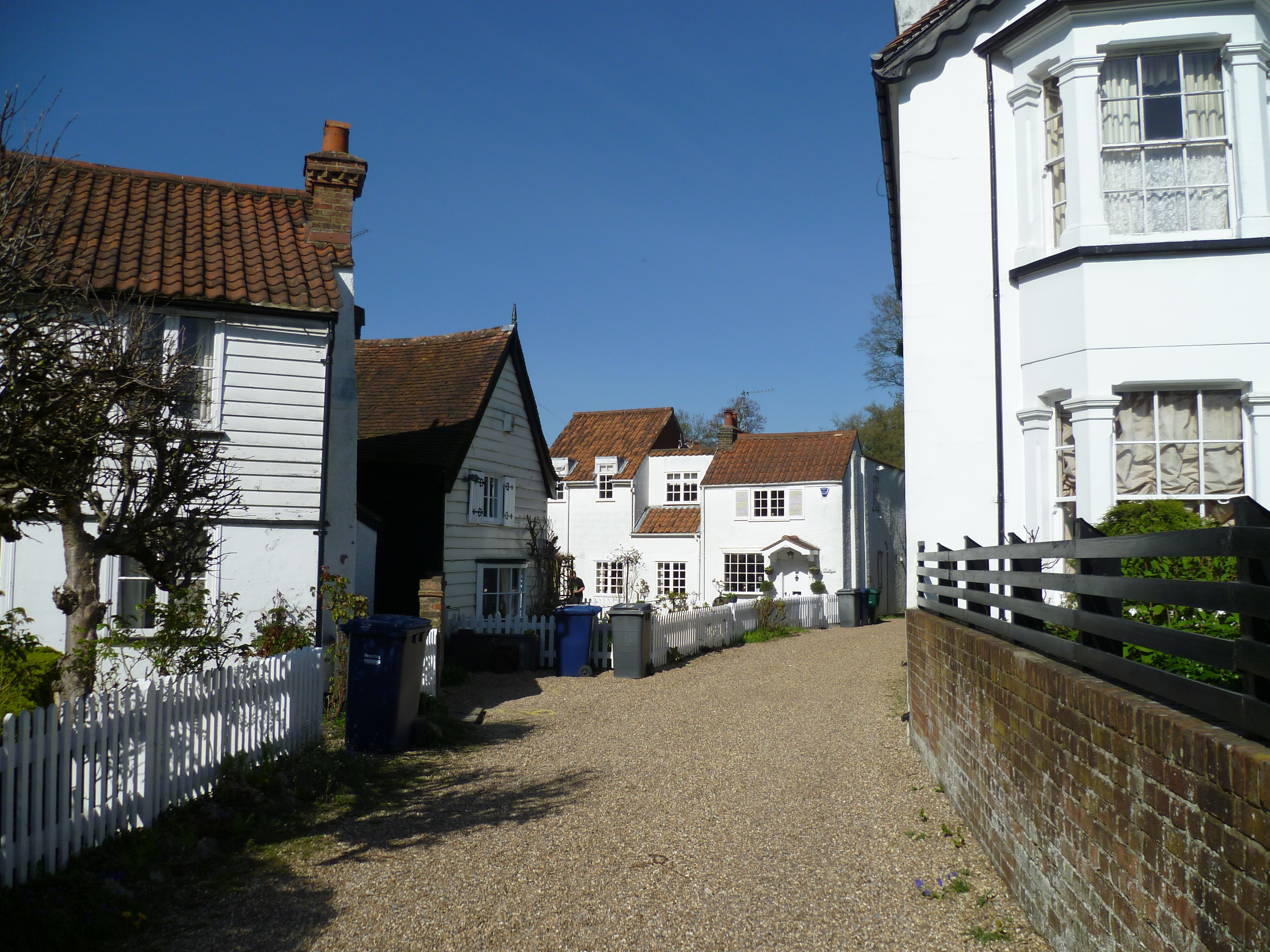
- Cottages in Monken Hadley

- Location within Greater London
- OS grid reference: TQ245975
  - Charing Cross: 11 mi (18 km) SSE
- London borough: Barnet
- Ceremonial county: Greater London
- Region: London
- Country: England
- Sovereign state: United Kingdom
- Post town: BARNET
- Postcode district: EN5
- Dialling code: 020
- Police: Metropolitan
- Fire: London
- Ambulance: London
- UK Parliament: Chipping Barnet
- London Assembly: Barnet and Camden

Monken Hadley is an area in the London Borough of Barnet, at the northern edge of Greater London, England, lying some 11 miles (18 km) north northwest of Charing Cross. Anciently a country village near Chipping Barnet in Middlesex, and from 1889 to 1965 in Hertfordshire, it is now a suburban area, while retaining some of its rural character.

== Etymology ==
The old English place name "Hadley" means "heathery", a woodland clearing which is covered in heather. The prefix "Monken" refers to the fact that the parish was a possession of the monks of Walden Abbey. This is a development from 19th century historians, who argued that it was "compounded of two Saxon words – Head-leagh, or a high place; Mankin is probably derived from the connexion of the place with the abbey of Walden, to which it was given by Geoffrey de Mandeville, earl of Essex, under the name of the Hermitage of Hadley".

== History ==
=== Middle Ages ===
Historically Monken Hadley was a civil parish of Middlesex, forming part of a small protrusion into Hertfordshire. 19th-century historians took the parish to have been "formerly a hamlet to Edmonton ... on the east side of the great north road, eleven miles from London". Its manor belonged to the Mandevilles, the founder of the Hermitage, and was given by Geoffrey de Mandeville to the monks of Walden, eventually being purchased by the Pinney family in 1791.

One house, thought to have been connected to a monastic establishment was later owned by David Garrow, father of the great adversarial lawyer Sir William Garrow (1760–1840), coiner of the phrase "innocent until proven guilty", who was born and brought up in the village. As of 1827 that house had surviving "Chimney-pieces ... in alto-relievo: on one is sculptured the story of Sampson; the other represents many passages in the life of our Saviour, from his birth in the stall to his death on the cross".

The main site of the Battle of Barnet in 1471, one of the two principal engagements of the Wars of the Roses, was in the parish of Monken Hadley. Yorkist troops advanced through the village, although the action took place north (Hadley Wood) and west (Hadley Green) of the settlement. Although the retreat of the forces of Lord William Hastings (at the hands of the Earl of Oxford) took place in the parish of Barnet, all of the other key engagements were within Monken Hadley parish, including the historically significant death of Richard Neville, 16th Earl of Warwick, believed to be at the place where a monument now stands on the Great North Road.

=== Stuarts to Georgians ===
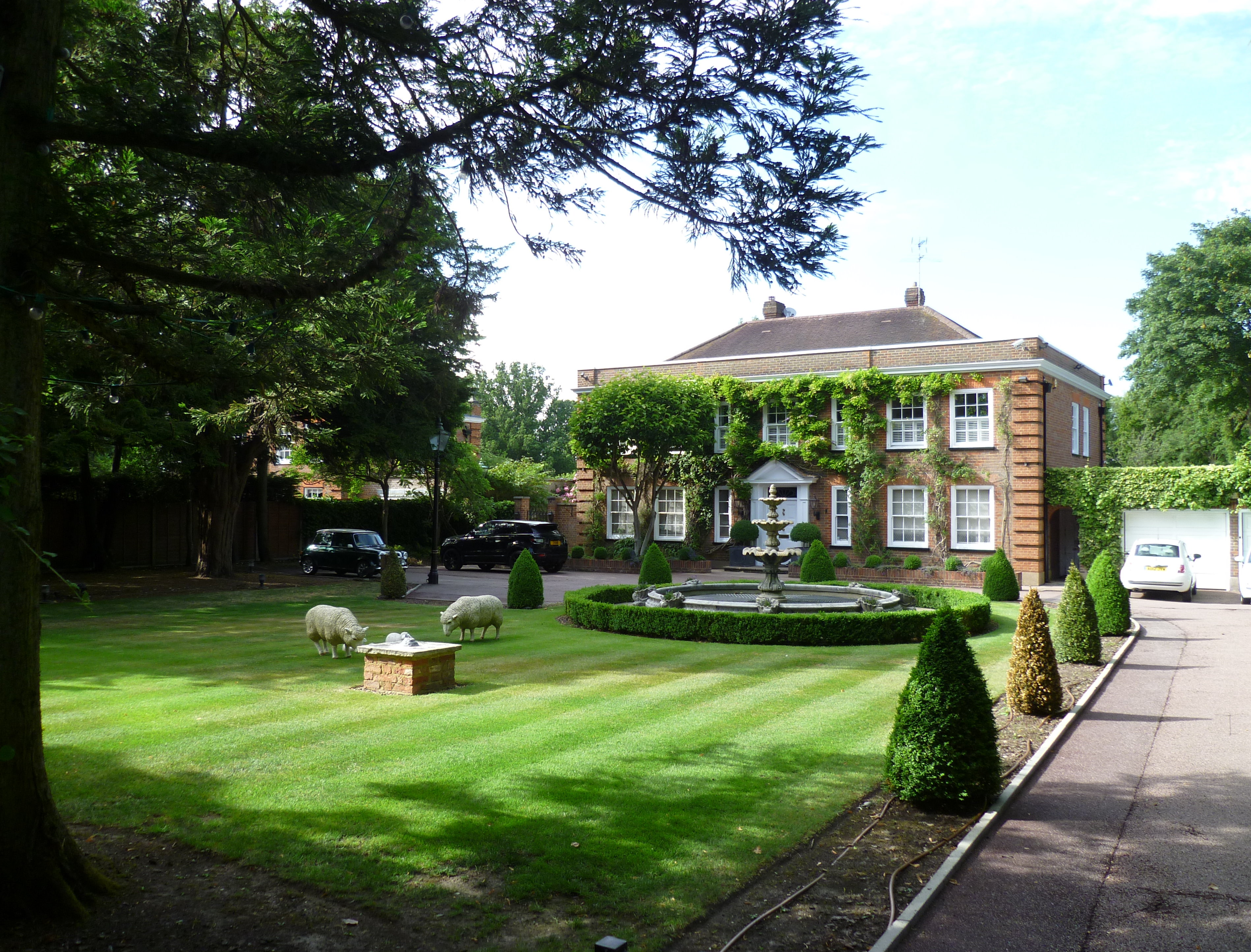
Little Pipers, Hadley Green Road

Sir Roger Wilbraham (1553–1616), Solicitor-General for Ireland, lived here towards the end of his life and is buried in the church, where his family monument is still visible. In 1616, he founded almshouses in the village for six decayed housekeepers. Anthony Upton, a High Court judge in Ireland, was born in the village in 1656.

The almshouses' endowment was modest and by 1827 was producing "more than 9£.6s. annually". The annuity was increased by Major Delafonte in 1762 but it expired in 1805, though a Mr Cottrell started a subscription and raised £2375 to be kept in trust. Samuel Whitbread also subscribed £1000 to support the almshouses.

When corrupt lawyer George Booth died in 1726, Hester Pinney had been living with him in the village for three years and was his only executor. He left her the manor of Monken Hadley twelve miles outside London. Pinney died on 19 February 1740 in Holborn.

Monken Hadley parish in 1894

A charity-school for girls was established in 1773 and expanded into a school of industry in 1800. That school was granting £1 each for clothes to twenty of its girls by 1827, at which date it also admitted thirty more girls for a weekly sum of 2d, who filled gaps in classes left by the £1 girls. This school and a boys' school were also supported by local inhabitants' contributions. As of 1804, the boys' school's endowment totalled £103 10 shillings and by 1827, it had 70 "day-scholars", twenty of whom were allowed £1 towards clothing and given free tuition, whilst the rest paid 2d a week.

=== 19th century to present ===
By 1827, the parish covered "580 acres, including 240 allotted in lieu of the common enclosure of Enfield Chase" and the manor was owned by Peter Moore, Esq. In 1830, Stoberry Lodge was built. In 1840, the village became part of the Metropolitan Police District, in which it remains. In 1889, under the Local Government Act 1888, the civil parish was transferred to Hertfordshire. Under the Local Government Act 1894 the parish was split in two, with a Hadley parish becoming part of the Barnet Urban District, while the remaining part of the parish became part of the East Barnet Urban District of Hertfordshire.

The writers Kingsley Amis and Elizabeth Jane Howard lived for a time in Lemmons, a house near the Common, where their friend the Poet Laureate Cecil Day-Lewis died. On 1 April 1965, the parish was abolished and under the London Government Act 1963, its area was transferred to Greater London and combined with that of other districts formerly in Hertfordshire and Middlesex to form the present-day London Borough of Barnet. At the 1951 census (one of the last before the abolition of the parish), Monken Hadley had a population of 4,061. Spike Milligan (1918–2002), comedian, lived at Monkenhurst in the village from 1974 until 2002.

== Parish church ==
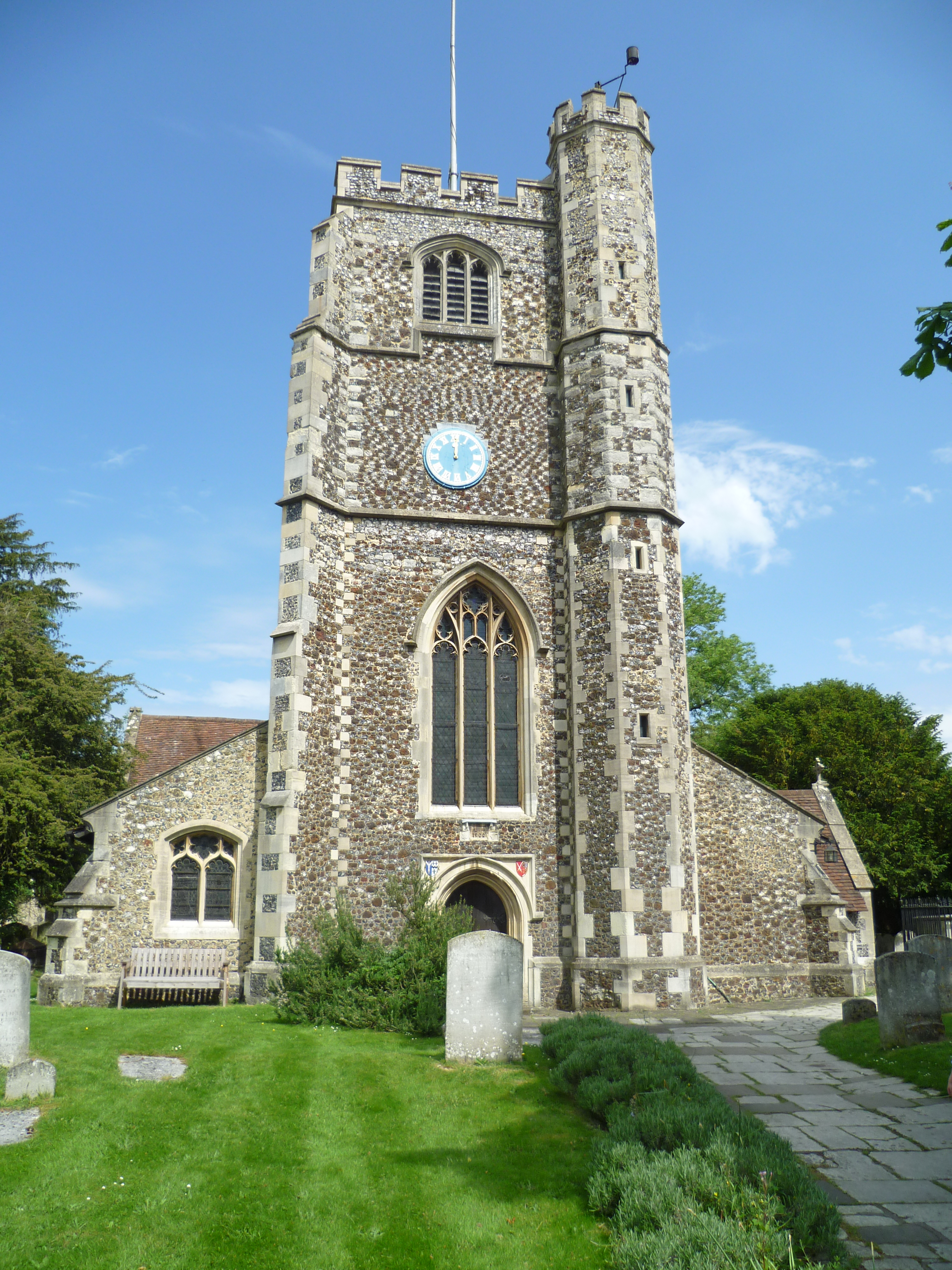
St Mary, Monken Hadley

The parish church of St Mary the Virgin was built in its present form in 1494 (the date being carved in stone over the west door) although a church is believed to have stood on the site for more than 800 years. The present building is in the perpendicular style, and includes two side chapels (in transepts) dedicated to St Anne and St Catherine. The building was heavily renovated in Victorian times, and contains large quantities of Victorian woodwork furniture. The parish and church were heavily influenced by tractarianism and the Oxford Movement, and it remains a focus of eucharistic worship within the surrounding district.

== Sport and recreation ==
Monken Hadley has a Non-League football team Hadley F.C. who play at their Brickfield Lane ground in nearby Arkley.

King George's Fields is an open space that is popular for tobogganing when there has been a good fall of snow. The fields descend into the Hadley Woods, which make their way into the Tudor Sports Ground area. Hadley Green is a Local Nature Reserve which is a Site of Metropolitan Importance, and traditionally considered the main site of the Battle of Barnet.

Hadley Common has a cricket field, home to a well-known cricket club, Monken Hadley CC, which is mentioned in one of the works of Anthony Trollope, who lived in Monken Hadley.

== School ==
Monken Hadley CofE primary school, sitting opposite the cricket field within Hadley Common, was founded in 1832. It serves approximately 20 children per year from the local areas; predominantly High Barnet, New Barnet and Hadley Wood. While each year has only 20 children each class has 30 children; this results in classes with mixed year groups.

The current head is Ms. Julie Eyres.

== Transport links ==
=== Buses ===
Monken Hadley and Hadley Green are not well-served by bus routes, with most services terminating further south in Barnet. The two Transport for London routes which run nearby are:

- 84 – New Barnet railway station to St Albans
- 399 – Barnet (the Spires) to Hadley Wood railway station – circular service; Monday to Saturday shopping hours only.

=== Railway ===
Both fairly nearby are:

- New Barnet railway station – Great Northern
- Hadley Wood railway station – Great Northern

=== Tube ===
Two tube stations are relatively nearby:

- High Barnet (Northern Line) is the closer of the two and lies to the south, within walking distance (under a mile), and is accessible via the 84 bus.
- Cockfosters (Piccadilly Line) is accessible via a longer walk, nearly three miles, eastwards across Monken Hadley Common.

== See also ==
- Battle of Barnet
- Hadley Brewery
- Hadley Green
- King George's Fields
- List of listed buildings in Hadley
- Monken Hadley Common
