= Pears (surname) =

Pears is a surname. Notable people with the surname include:

- Aynsley Pears (b. 1998), English footballer
- Andrew Pears (c. 1770–1845), originator of Pears soap
- Bernard Pears, founder of the William Pears Group
- David Pears (1921–2009), British philosopher
- Edwin Pears (1835–1919), British barrister, author and historian
- Erik Pears (b. 1982), American football offensive tackle
- Harry Pears (1877–1912), Australian rules footballer
- Iain Pears (b. 1955), English writer and historian
- Jeff Pears (1920–2003), English professional footballer
- Ken Pears (1934–2022), Canadian soccer goalkeeper
- Mark Pears (b. 1962), British businessman
- Peter Pears (1910-1986), English tenor
- Richard Pears (b. 1976), English footballer
- Stephen Pears (b. 1962), English footballer and goalkeeping coach
- Tayte Pears (b. 1990), Australian rules footballer
- Tim Pears (b. 1956), English novelist
- Trevor Pears (b. 1964), British businessman, grandson of Bernard

== See also ==
- Pearse (surname)
- Piers (name)
