= Rhoda Wyburn =

English milliner and businesswoman

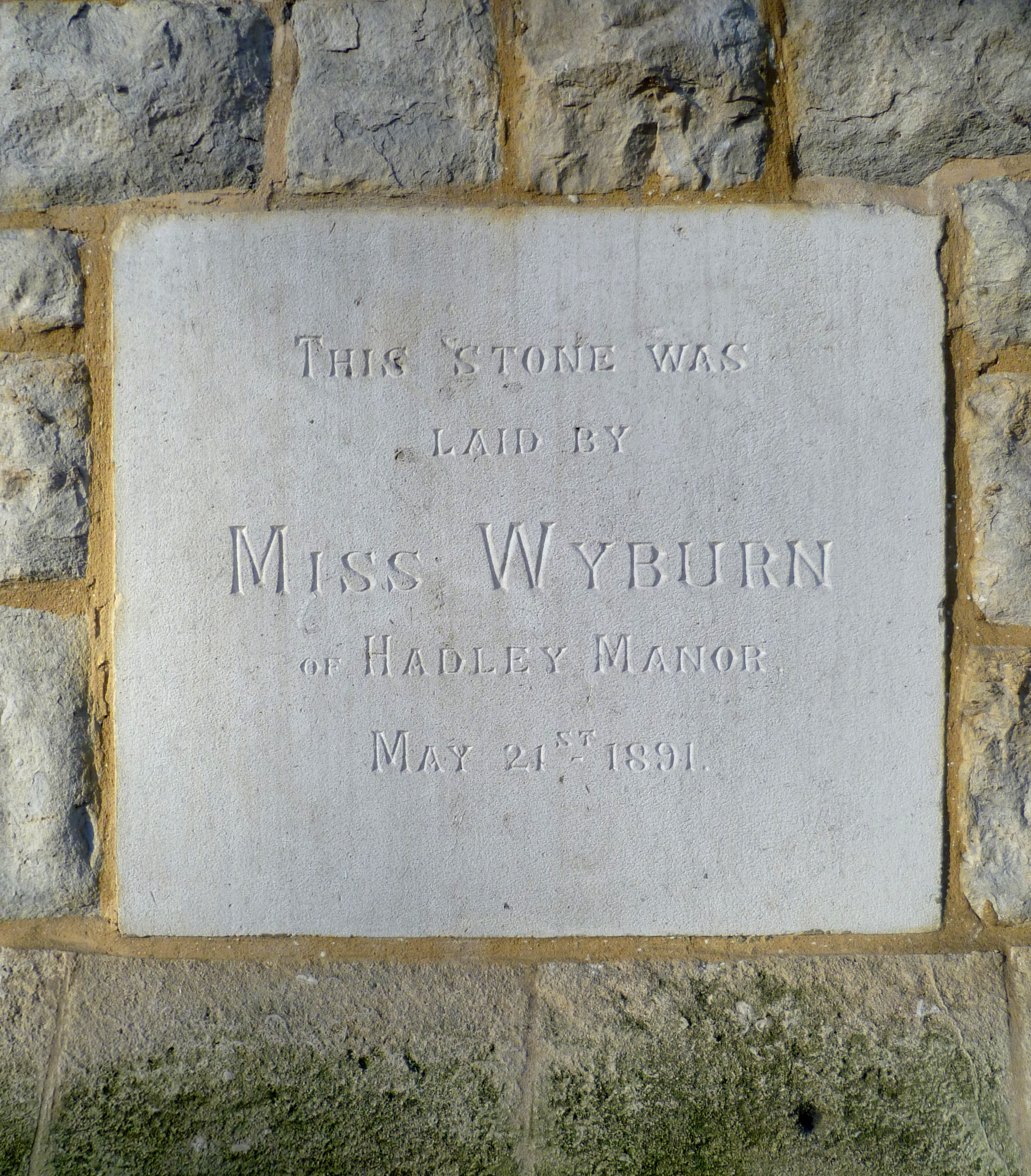
Foundation stone for the High Barnet Methodist Church, laid 1891.

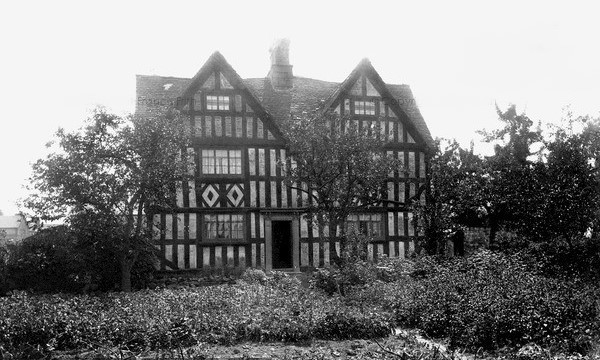
Hadley Manor, 1901.

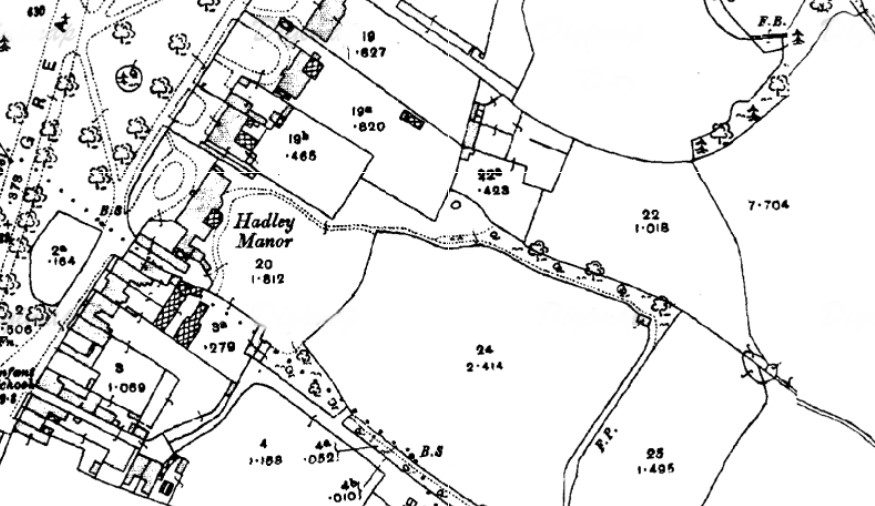
Hadley Manor on a 1910s map.

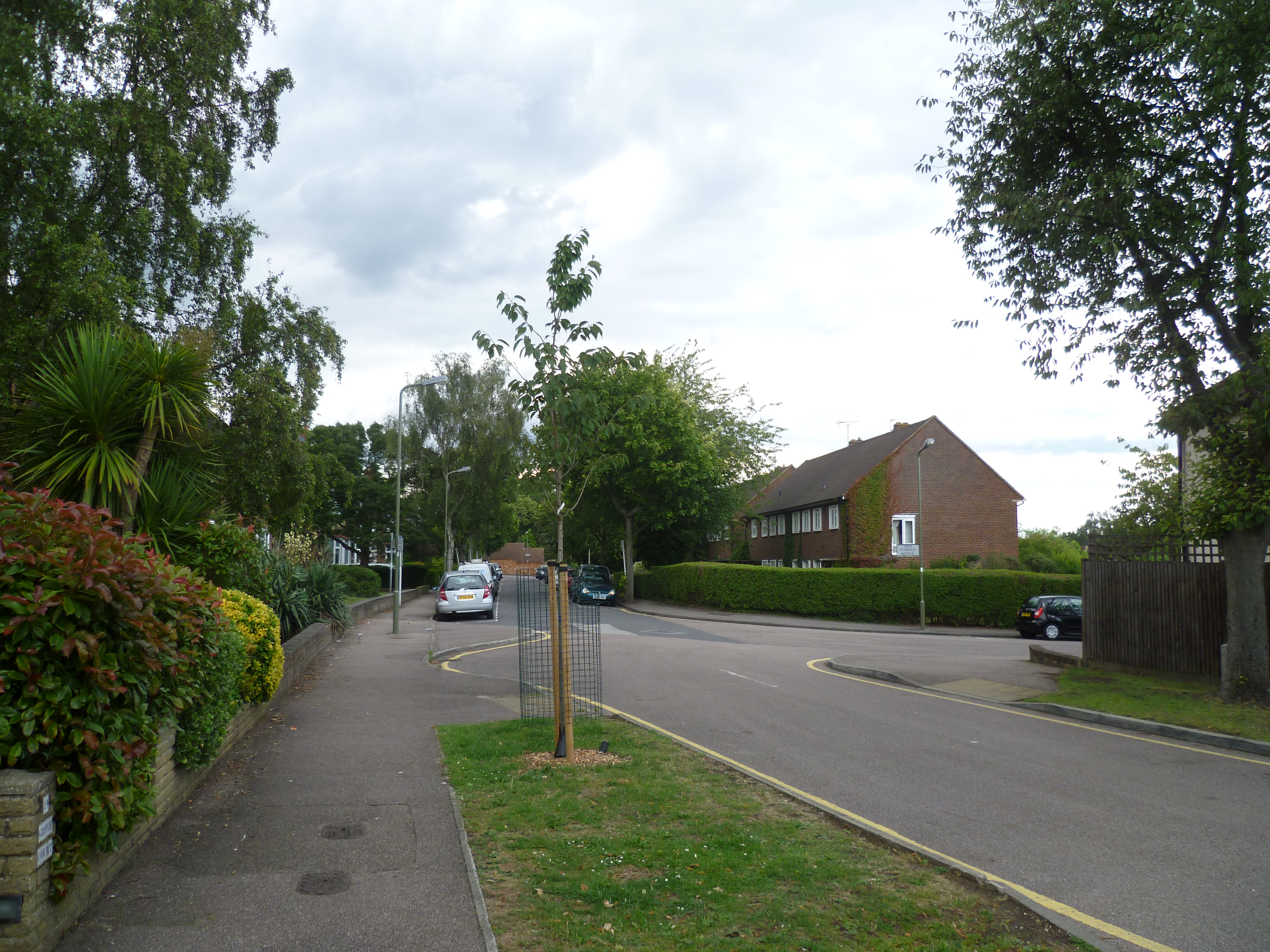
Hadley Ridge and Wyburn Avenue, Chipping Barnet.

Rhoda Wyburn (25 August 1841 - 8 May 1934) was an English milliner who with her sister Emily ran a successful business in Regent Street that enabled them to buy Hadley Manor near Chipping Barnet in north London. The sisters were committed Methodists who donated funds to establish Methodist churches in north London and elsewhere.

== Early life ==
Rhoda Wyburn was born in Somerset, on 25 August 1841, to Robert and Susanna Wyburn. She had a sister Emily (c. 1837 - March 1913). Their father was a cabinet-maker and Methodist preacher who owned the Woolavington Throckmorton manor house in Woolavington, Somerset.

== Career ==
With her sister Emily, Rhoda Wyburn ran a millinery business in Bridgwater, Somerset, and later had premises at 246 Regent Street, London, under the name Mademoiselle Emelie.

== Hadley Manor ==
In 1890, the sisters bought Hadley Manor from Julia Hyde, widow of Henry Hyde of Ely Place, Holborn, thus becoming lords of the Manor of Hadley. The manor house stood on the eastern side of Hadley Green Road, to the north of Chipping Barnet, until it was destroyed by fire in the early 1930s. It was purchased by East Barnet council in 1934 on Rhoda's death and demolished in 1935. At about the same time, Rhoda gave to the public the land known as Hadley Manor Fields to the rear of the manor house which was combined with purchases from adjacent estates such as the Hadley Hurst Estate and Gladsmuir Estate to form King George's Fields which were created to mark the jubilee of King George V. Nothing remains of the manor house today and the site is used as the western entrance to King George's Fields.

== Methodism ==
A Miss Wyburn laid the foundation stone for the High Barnet Methodist Church in 1891. It was demolished in the 1980s apart from the spires which are now incorporated into The Spires Shopping Centre. Miss Wyburn also funded the first Wesleyan Methodist Chapel in the area which was "a good iron hut" transferred to East Barnet from Hadley Manor in 1915.

In Somerset, Miss E. Wyburn laid the foundation stone for the "New" Wesleyan Methodist Church in Middlezoy in 1898. In 1901, a Miss Wyburn laid the foundation stone for the Queen Victoria Seamen's Rest home in Jeremiah Street, Poplar.

== Death and legacy ==
Rhoda Wyburn died on 8 May 1934. A notice in The London Gazette gave her address as Hadley Manor and 19 Burton Road, Branksome Park, Bournemouth. The executors of her Will were Mrs Susan Emily Evans and John William Pepper. She left no descendants. A legacy from the Wyburn family continues to fund Methodist activity in Barnet.
