= Ucsu =

UCSU may refer to:

- University of Cumbria Students' Union
- University of Chichester Students' Union
