= Mary Morrell =

British medical scientist and academic

- Education: St Mary's Hospital, London; Imperial College London
- Scientific career
- Institutions: Royal Brompton Hospital; University of Wisconsin–Madison
- Thesis: Interaction of neurophysiological chemical and mechanical factors in respiratory control during wakefulness and sleep in humans (1994)

Mary Morrell is a British medical scientist who is a professor of Sleep and Respiratory Physiology at Imperial College London, and head of the Pears Cumbria School of Medicine. Her research considers sleep apnoea and sleep disordered breathing. She was awarded the 2023 Imperial College Medal.

== Early life and education ==
Morrell trained and practised as a nurse at St Mary's Hospital, London. She was a doctoral researcher at Charing Cross Hospital, where she became interested in sleep and controlling breathing. She studied patients with lateral medullary syndrome, who suffered from brain stem lesions. During her PhD, she became interested in the hypocapnic apnoeic threshold. She was awarded a Ph.D. in physiology from the University of London. She was a postdoctoral researcher at the University of Wisconsin–Madison.

== Research and career ==
Morrell established the UK Respiratory Sleep Research Network, which led clinical trials that designed new National Institute for Health and Care Excellence healthcare guidelines. She runs the Royal Brompton Hospital chronic respiratory failure and sleep research group.

At Imperial College London, Morrell led a review of the medical curriculum, strengthening students' clinical skills and increasing their engagement with technology. She led a programme in Cardiovascular and Respiratory Healthcare. She was awarded the President’s Medal for Excellence in Teaching in 2014. Morrell was made the President of the British Sleep Society in 2016. In 2024, she was made head of the Pears Cumbria School of Medicine, which teaches a four year graduate programme for health and biosciences graduates.

In 2023, Morrell was awarded the Imperial College Medal.

== Selected publications ==
- Adam V Benjafield; Najib T Ayas; Peter R. Eastwood; et al. (9 July 2019). "Estimation of the global prevalence and burden of obstructive sleep apnoea: a literature-based analysis". The Lancet. Respiratory medicine. 7 (8): 687–698. doi:10.1016/S2213-2600(19)30198-5. ISSN 2213-2600. PMC 7007763. PMID 31300334. Wikidata Q91838010.
- Mary J. Morrell; Donald W. McRobbie; Rebecca A. Quest; Andrew R. C. Cummin; Ramesh Ghiassi; Douglas R. Corfield (1 September 2003). "Changes in brain morphology associated with obstructive sleep apnea". Sleep Medicine. 4 (5): 451–454. doi:10.1016/S1389-9457(03)00159-X. ISSN 1389-9457. PMID 14592287. Wikidata Q48157373.
- Ivana Rosenzweig; Martin Glasser; Dora Polsek; Guy D Leschziner; Steven C. R. Williams; Mary J Morrell (14 April 2015). "Sleep apnoea and the brain: a complex relationship". The Lancet. Respiratory medicine. 3 (5): 404–414. doi:10.1016/S2213-2600(15)00090-9. ISSN 2213-2600. PMID 25887982. Wikidata Q38427202.
