= The Spires Barnet =

Shopping centre in Chipping Barnet, north London

Coordinates: 51.6555°N 0.2031°W

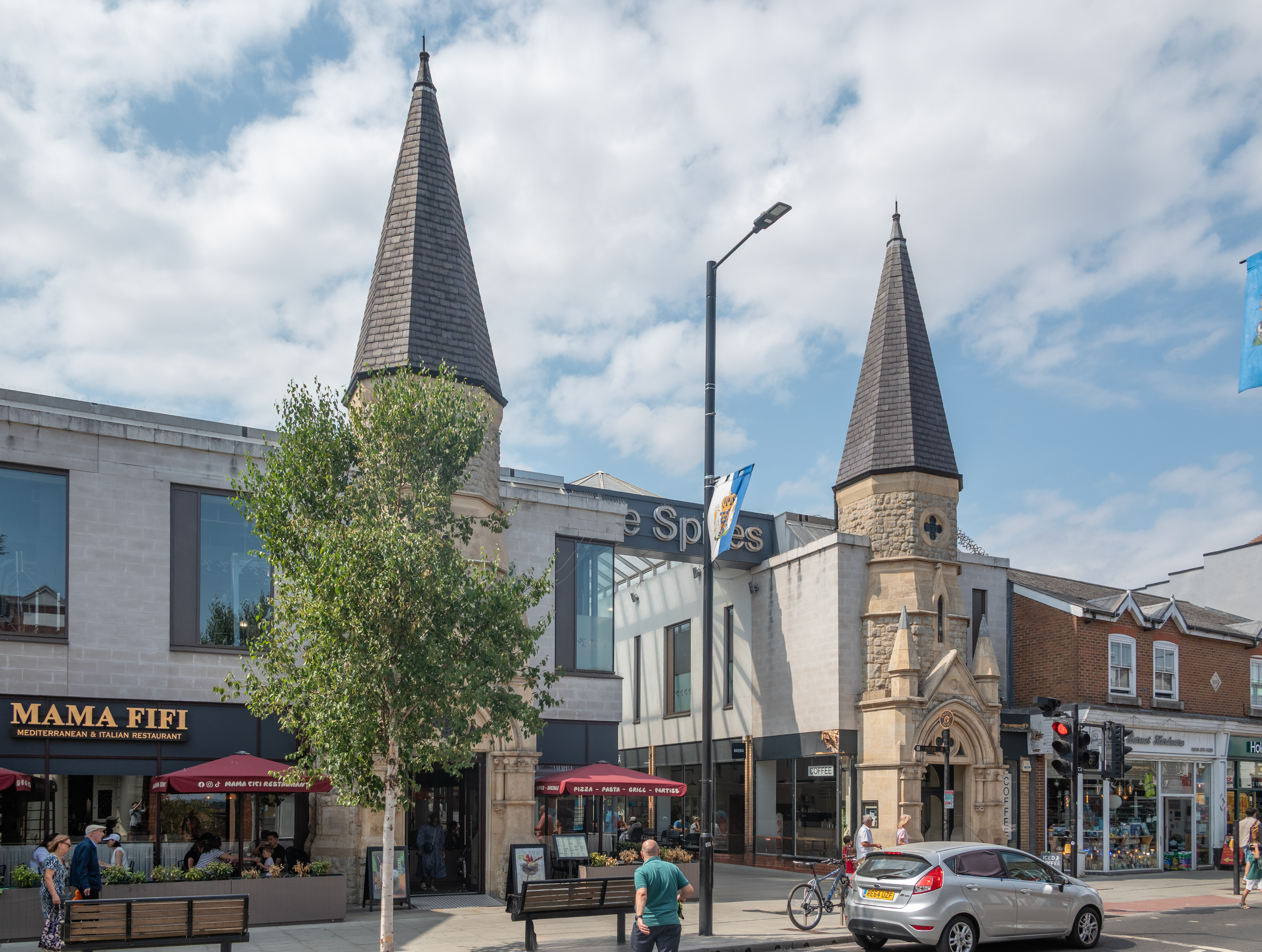
- Location: Chipping Barnet, England
- Opened: May 1989; 37 years ago
- Manager: Hunter Real Estate
- Owner: AIMCo
- Floor area: 90,000 square feet
- Floors: 1
- Parking: Multi-storey car park (440 spaces)
- Website: http://www.thespiresbarnet.co.uk

The Spires Barnet is a shopping centre in Chipping Barnet, north London, England. It is located in the centre of the town, on the High Street, and incorporates the twin spires of the former High Barnet Methodist Church which stood on the site until the late 1980s.

== History ==
The Spires takes its name from a pair of steeples incorporated into its facade that were originally part of the High Barnet Methodist Church, the foundation stone for which was laid by Miss Wyburn of Hadley Manor in 1891. Miss Wyburn also funded the first Wesleyan Methodist Chapel in the area which was "a good iron hut" in East Barnet opened in 1915. The High Barnet church was opened in 1892 by the Reverend Dr Thomas Bowman Stephenson, founder of the National Children's Home. It was demolished in the late 1980s to make way for the shopping centre, with the exception of the two steeples.

== Architecture ==
The shopping centre has many hallmarks of a smaller suburban shopping centre, and receives around 70,000 visitors per week. It is unenclosed, and has two open-air atria along its length for people to pass through as they use the centre. Today these open areas are occupied by seating areas for several cafes. There is also an attached multi-storey car park, intended for the use of visitors to the centre and the neighbouring high street.

== Ownership ==
The Spires was developed in 1988 by the Lovell Group. Its property consultants Hillier Parker arranged a forward sale of the scheme to Norwich Union. In April 2013, William Pears Group bought The Spires from the bank UBS for a reported £34 million. Under their ownership the high street frontage was extensively remodelled. The Spires has since been bought by the Canadian investment fund AIMCo. In December 2015, Hunter Real Estate, who manage the centre on behalf of AIMCo, announced proposals for a £7 million scheme of improvements.

== Transport ==
The centre is served by many bus routes, including the 614 and 234. The nearest tube station is High Barnet, situated approximately 10 minutes walk south of the High Street.

The church next to the shopping centre serves the 34, which provides links to Walthamstow Bus Station, Crooked Billet (South Chingford), Cooks Ferry, Meridian Water, Silver Street for North Middlesex Hospital, Great Cambridge Roundabout, Palmers Green Clockhouse, Arnos Grove, Whetstone and High Barnet.

== Gallery ==
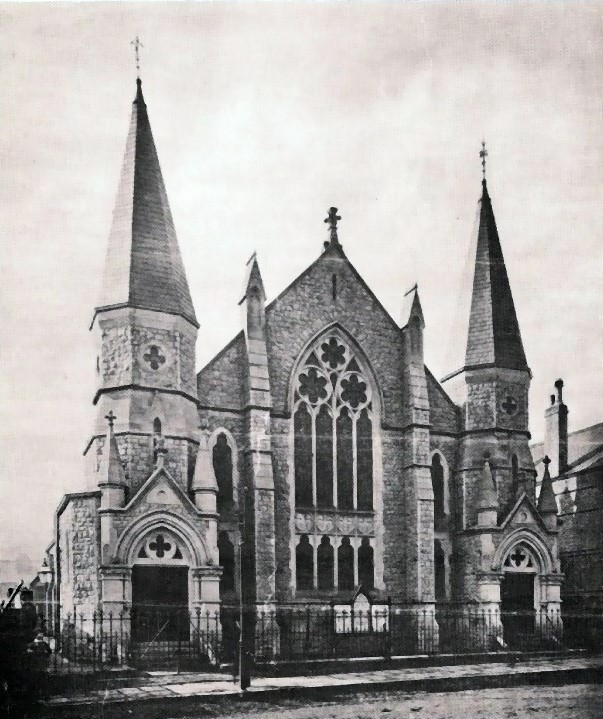
The old High Barnet Methodist Church

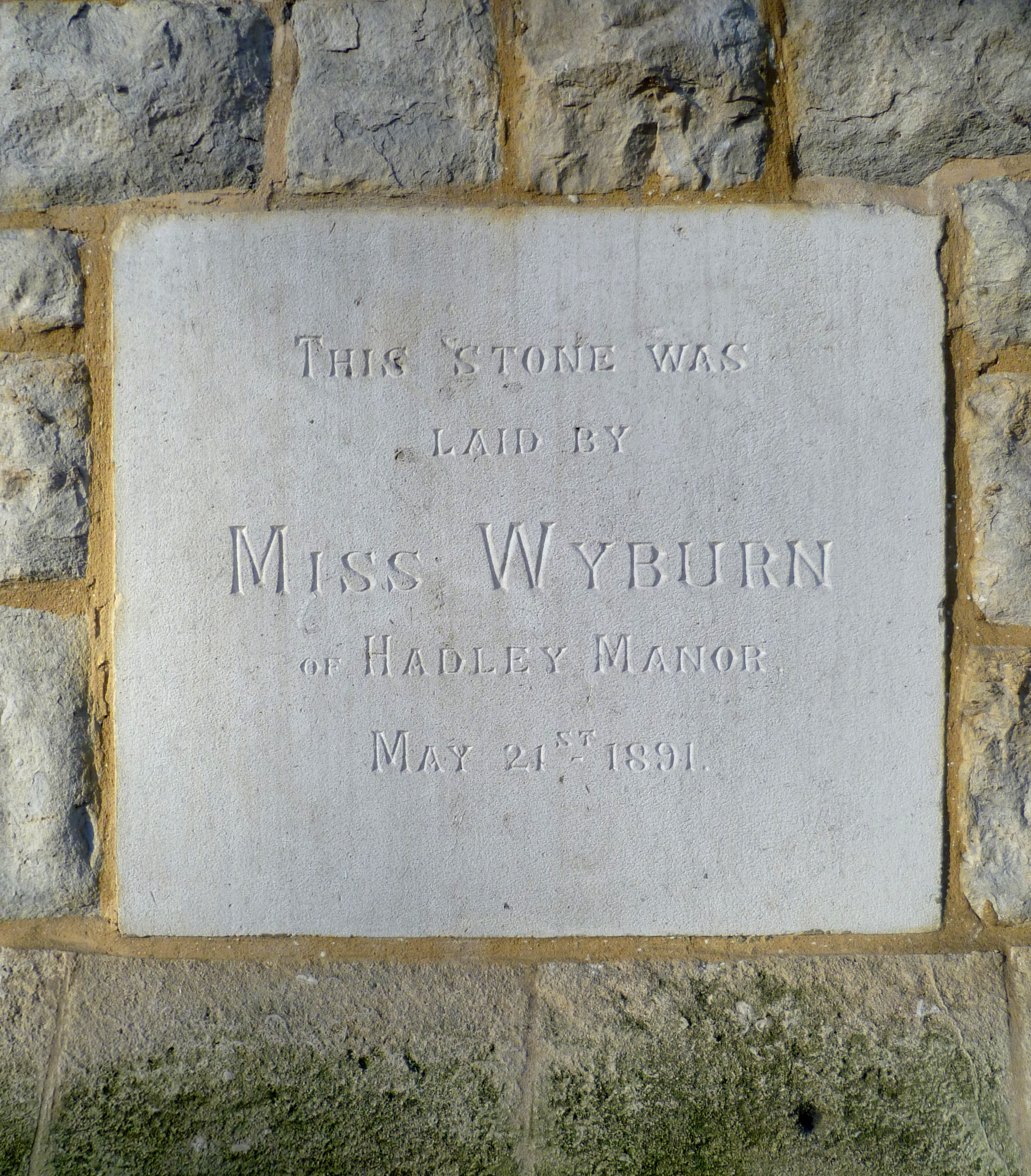
High Barnet Methodist Church foundation stone, 1891

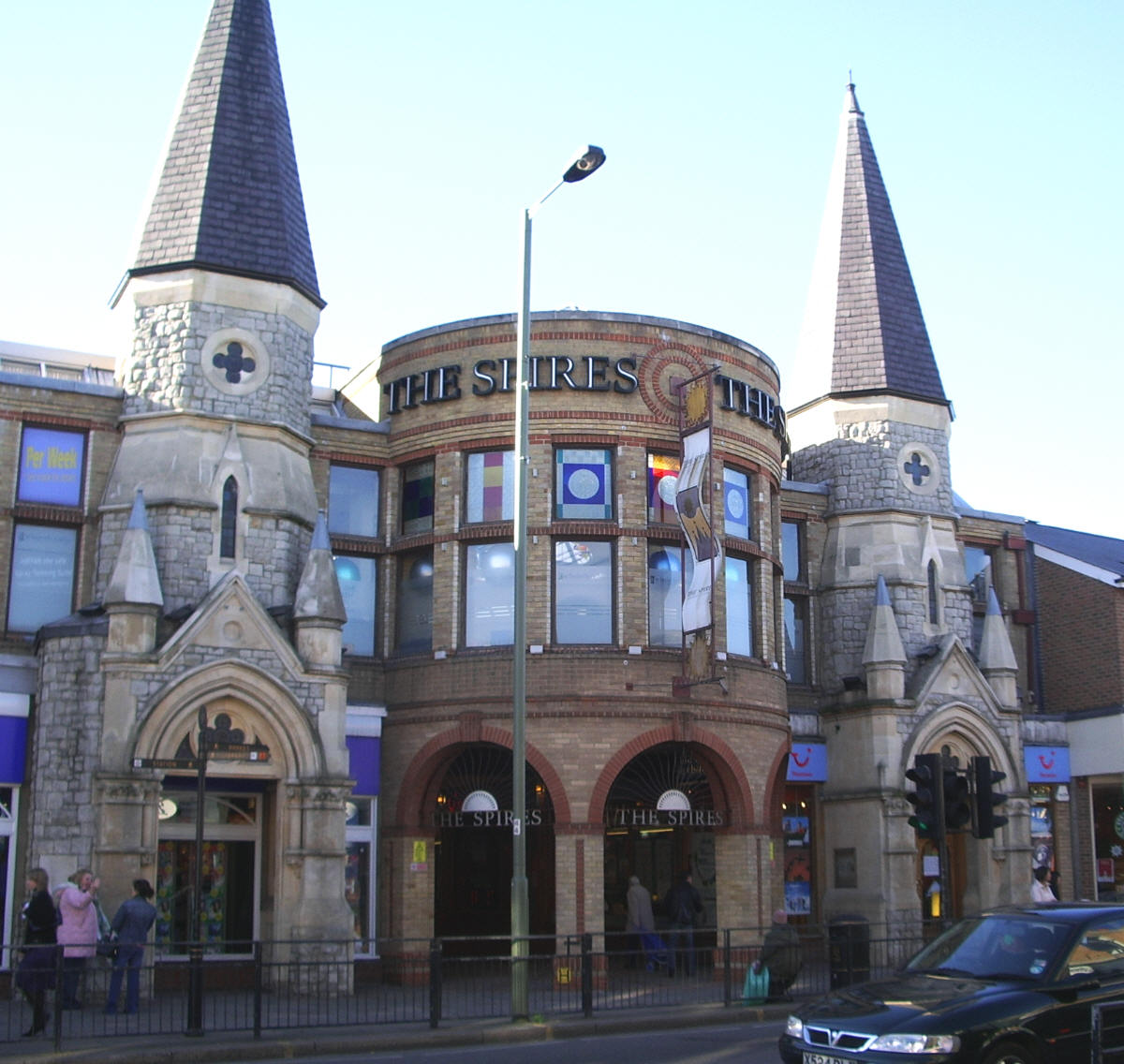
The Spires in 2006

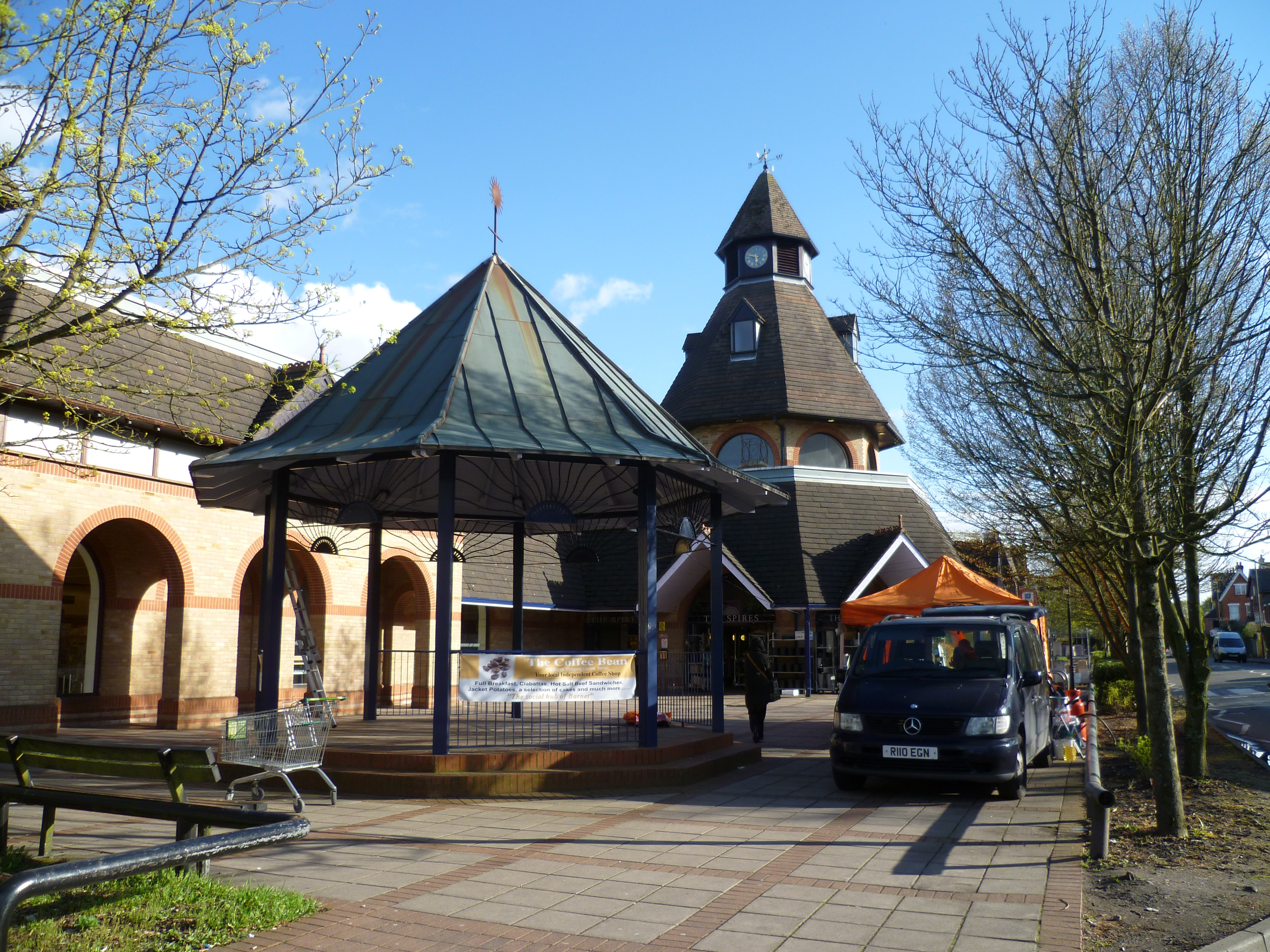
Rear of The Spires with bandstand and clock tower
