= Victoria Recreation Ground, New Barnet =

Public park in London Borough of Barnet, UK

Coordinates: 51.6527°N 0.1703°W

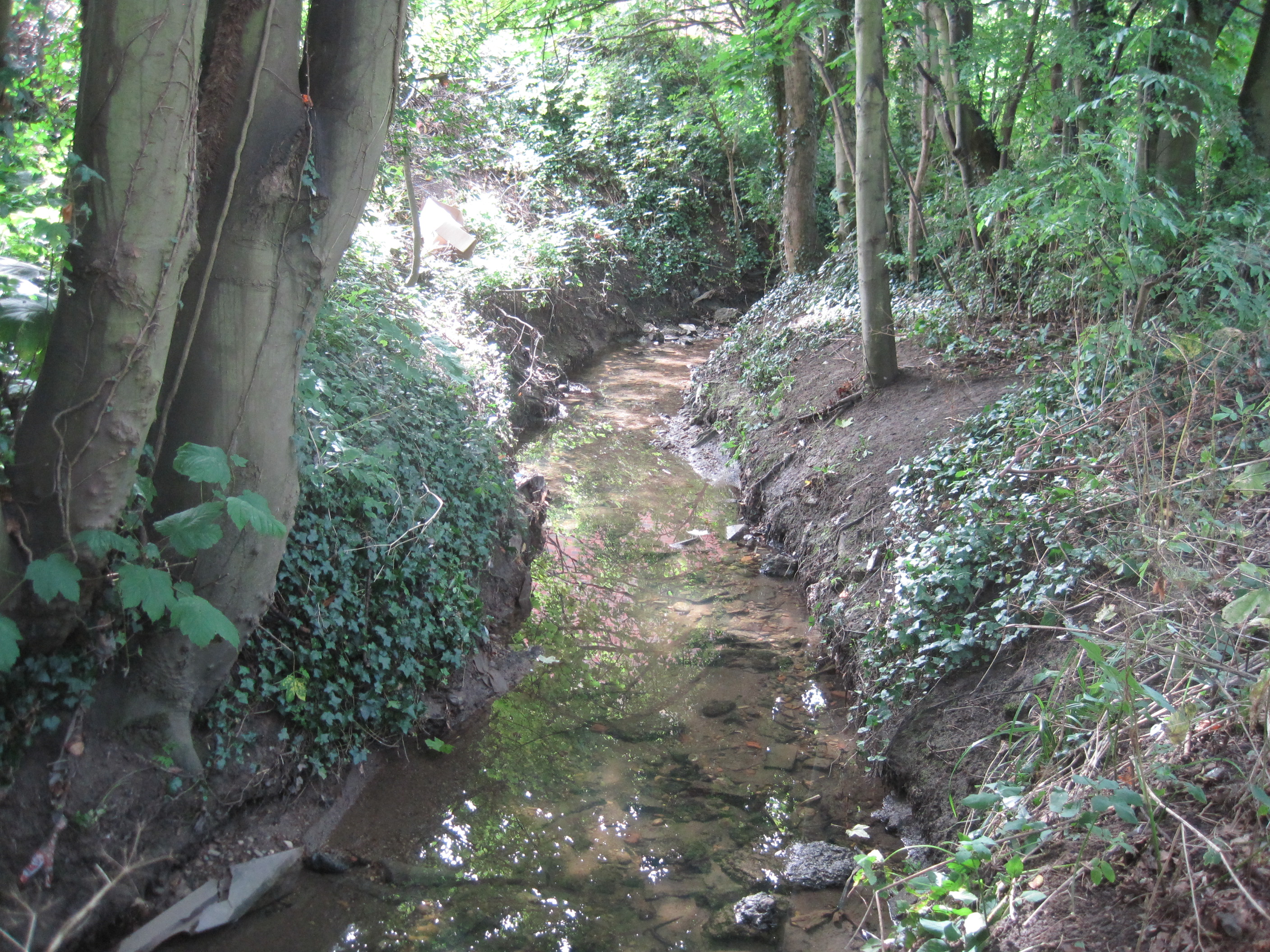
Shirebourne brook on the south side of Victoria Recreation Ground

Victoria Recreation Ground is a public park in New Barnet in the London Borough of Barnet, United Kingdom. It is one of Barnet's 'Premier Parks'.

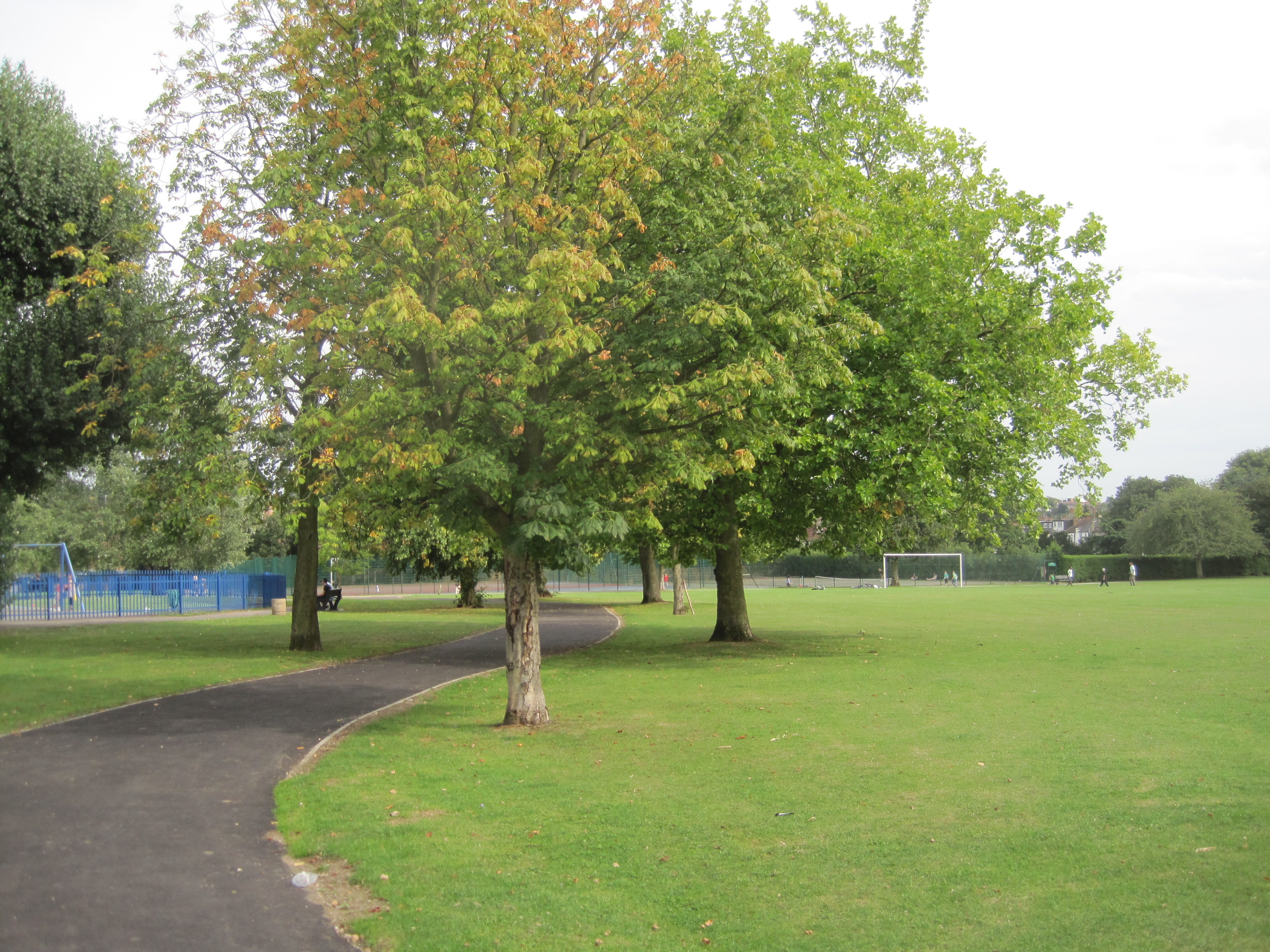
Victoria Recreation Ground

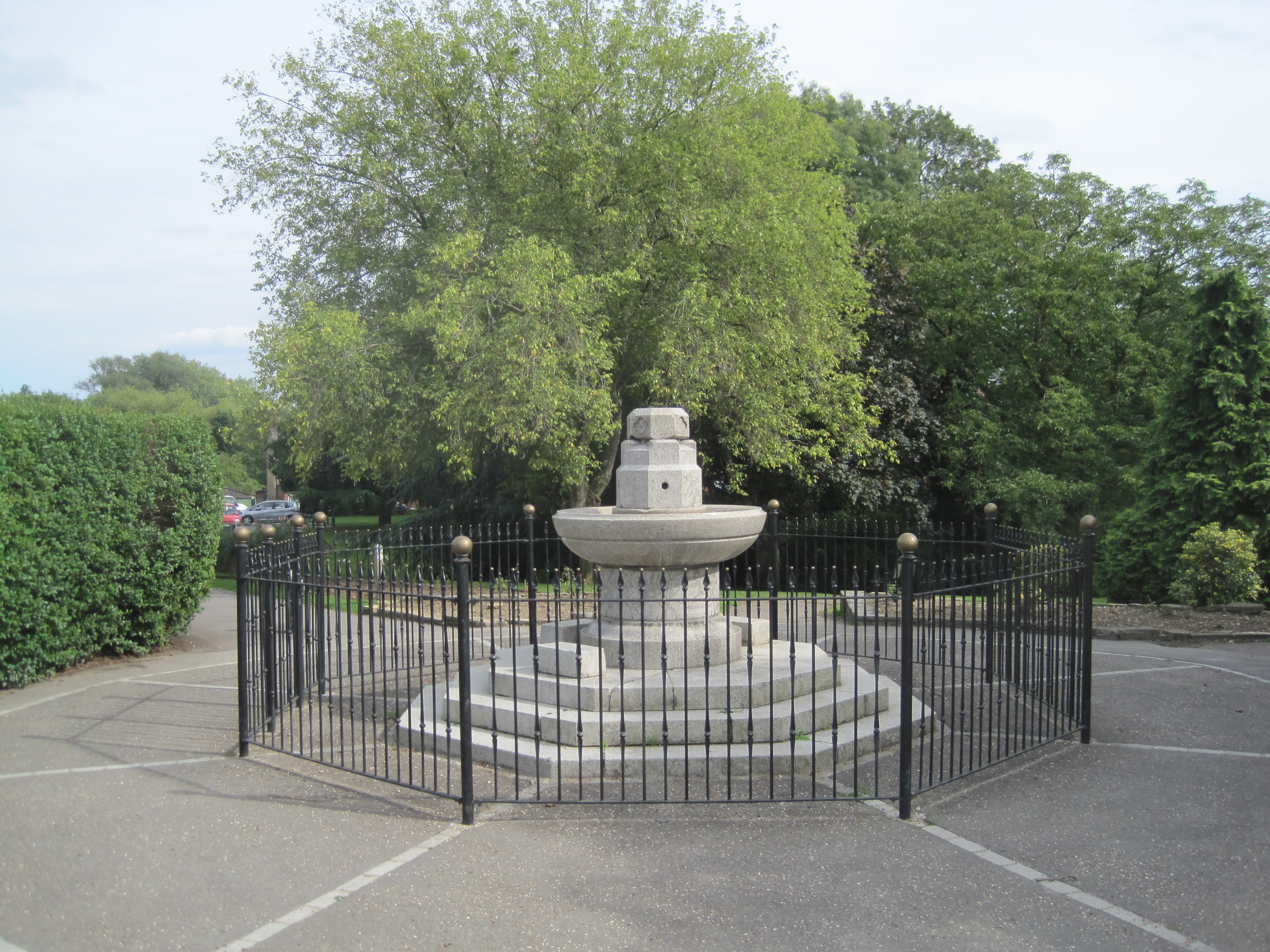
Drinking fountain installed by the Metropolitan Drinking Fountain and Cattle Trough Association

It is mainly grassed with a children's playground, football pitches, tennis and basketball courts, a bowling green and a car park. There are flower beds which are the remains of a formal flower garden.

The park is a roughly square area laid out in the late nineteenth century on land previously known as 'Mrs Cook's Farm', and Barnet Football Club played there in the 1889–90 season.

The Shirebourne Brook runs along the south side of the park and the Pymmes Brook Trail passes north–south through the park.

There is access from Park Road, Victoria Road, Lawton Road, and by a footpath and footbridge from Cromer Road.

== See also ==
- Barnet parks and open spaces
