= Kamal Chunchie =

Sri Lankan-British minister (1886–1953)

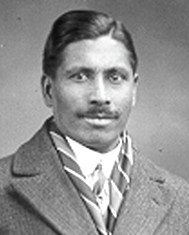
- Chunchie, c. 1920
- Born: 4 June 1886; Kandy, Ceylon
- Died: 3 July 1953 (aged 67); London, England
- Education: Kingswood College, Kandy
- Occupation: Pastor
- Known for: Founder of the Coloured Men's Institute

Kamal Chunchie (4 June 1886 – 3 July 1953) was a Ceylonese Methodist pastor, based in the East End of London. He was a community activist who campaigned against racism.

== Early life and education ==
Kamal Athon Chunchie was born in Kandy, Ceylon (now Sri Lanka), on 4 June 1886 into a prominent Muslim family of Malay heritage, members of the Inche Che clan. His father, Athon Chunchie, was influential in Muslim and Malay circles in Sri Lanka.

The eldest of nine siblings, Chunchie was educated at Kingswood College, Kandy, which was run by the Wesleyan Mission along the lines of an English public school. The young Chunchie was a prominent cricketer at school. He spoke Malay, Tamil, Sinhalese and English fluently. At Kingswood, he first met Methodist minister Rev. Walter J. Noble.

Chunchie joined the Ceylon Police when he left school, and rose to the rank of sub-inspector. He later transferred to the Singaporean Police.

== World War I ==
When World War I broke out, Chunchie attempted to sign up to serve in defence of the British Empire from his base in Singapore but was unsuccessful. In 1915, he travelled to Britain at his own expense and enlisted in the British Army's 3rd Middlesex Regiment in March 1916. Offered the opportunity to be an officer, he elected to serve as a private alongside the men with whom he had trained. He fought in France on the Western Front, as well as Italy and Salonika. Although Chunchie spoke little about his wartime experiences, his family believed that he was gassed twice and shot during his time in the armed forces.

Chunchie spent time in a convalescent camp called St Michael's on the island of Malta following one of his injuries. It is thought that this is where he converted to Christianity.

Following his recovery, Chunchie moved to serve in the Royal Army Service Corps, which saw him transferred to the UK, arriving on 6 March 1918. He served in Chatham, Kent, until he was discharged from duty in August 1919. Chunchie chose to stay in Britain, even though his discharge from service allowed him to return to Ceylon. His conversion to Christianity may have played a part in this decision, as his family believed that on hearing about his move away from Islam, his devout Muslim father struck his name from the family Quran, and marked it "Died 1919".

== Community activism and missionary work in Britain ==
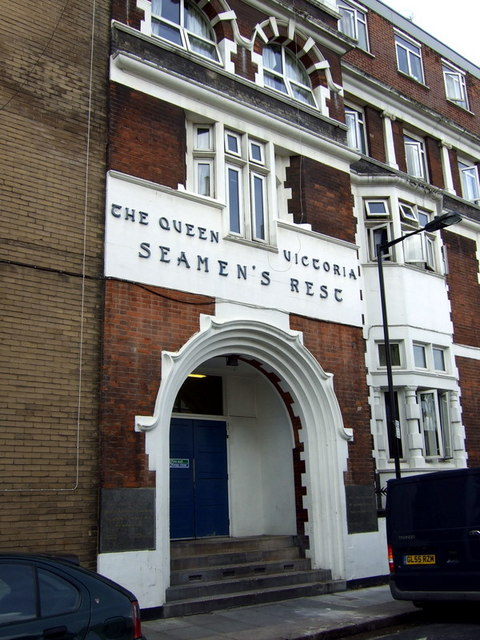
Queen Victoria Seamen's Rest, original entrance

By 1920, Chunchie was living in the East End of London. He was appalled by the way Black and Asian people were treated, and wanted to improve the social aspects of their lives. He experienced racism directly and was determined to fight against it. He later recounted an incident where he had been refused the right to buy a cup of tea for himself and a white sailor he was trying to help in a canteen of a sailors' mission by a woman who used a racial slur whilst standing beneath a sign which said "God is Love". Local attitudes, represented in the 1919 Race Riots in British port cities, combined with the passing of the Aliens Order 1920 and the Special Restriction (Coloured Alien Seamen) Order of 1925, led to the persecution of Black and Asian sailors who were undocumented but also British citizens or from parts of the British Empire. Many sailors had white wives and mixed race children living in the Docklands areas of London.

Chunchie was recruited by the Wesleyan Methodist Missionary Society (WMMS) to work as a missionary in Canning Town, in London. He began to work amongst the communities of Asian, Chinese, African and Caribbean seamen in the area in December 1921, where his fluency in several languages was an advantage. His first place of work was at the Queen Victoria Seamen's Rest in Poplar, which was linked to the WMMS. He trained as a preacher and worked as an non-ordained pastor, matching religious teaching with practical support for individuals and families in need. Although the WMMS were keen for Chunchie to travel as a missionary overseas, he refused, considering that there was ample need for his work in London.

To enable further help for these sailors and mixed race families in the area, Chunchie opened the Coloured Men's Wesleyan Methodist Church on Swanscombe Street in Canning Town in 1922. It included a Sunday school in the rented hall, and whilst based in religious work, it also offered food, clothes and medical supplies to the neediest of the community, as well as organising trips to the seaside. Chunchie described this as a "recreative institute" for people who suffered exclusion from other spaces because of racist attitudes towards Black, Asian and mixed race people.

Chunchie moved to the East London Mission when his working relationship with the Seamen's Mission began to falter. On 1 January 1925, the Wesleyan Methodist Missionary Society signed off on what was to become the Coloured Men's Institute (CMI), which combined social and religious work in a permanent building.

In 1926, the Coloured Men's Institute opened at Tidal Basin Road in Royal Victoria Dock at a cost of £3,000 (equivalent to £158,543 in 2025), in a refurbished building which previously housed a bar and opium den. Chunchie was appointed as pastor and live-in warden for the centre which had a remit of religious, social and welfare work. It was open to transient sailors and local residents. The opening address was given by Dr. Sharp of the WMMS who stated "I cannot help feeling that this inaugurates one of the finest pieces of mission work that we have yet undertaken".

In 1930, the Coloured Men's Institute's (CMI) building was demolished as part of a road widening scheme and was not replaced due to a growing gap of understanding between Chunchie and the funders, the Wesleyan Methodist Missionary Society. The CMI was highly valued by many but also had its detractors, which included the Universal Negro Improvement Association which supported segregation. Within the Methodists at Mission House, the view arose that too much was being spent on material aid, rather than spiritual support. Chunchie understood that it was "no use talking about religion to a man with cold feet and an empty stomach". This clashed with the Methodist leadership's view which prioritised religion in mission work.

No new building was sourced for the CMI but over the next 23 years Chunchie continued his community and missionary outreach work from his home and a docklands Presbyterian church. He fundraised by giving talks around Britain and through his networks. Chunchie was able to call on the support of other campaigners for racial equality, including Harold Moody, R. K. Sorabji, Shoran Singha and Lady Lydia Anderson. However, the financial situation of the CMI was precarious and Chunchie often paid for the activities from his own pocket.

Chunchie reflected the middle-class mores of the time and some of the people he felt needed his help did not appreciate some of the judgements made. When on a fundraising and awareness raising tour in South Shields, in 1937, he was critical of the domestic cleanliness of the local Muslim community and was roundly taken to task by the white wives of the Muslim men.

In World War II, Chunchie volunteered as a fireman near his home in Lewisham.

== Personal life ==
Chunchie met governess Mabel Williams Tappen while still enlisted as a soldier when they were both stationed in Chatham. Tappen was working there as a member of the Women's Army Auxiliary Corps. They married on 20 July 1920 at Leyton's Wesleyan Methodist Chapel in East London. Their only child, Muriel, was born the same year.

Chunchie was an avid cricketer and played cricket for Essex County Cricket Club. In 1935, he became a member of the Royal Empire Society, and served as vice-president of the League of Coloured Peoples.

Kamal Chunchie died after a heart attack on 3 July 1953 at the National Hospital for Diseases of the Heart in London. His grandson Tony recalls that the night before, when asked on his hospital bed what he would like, Chunchie said "a glass of brandy and a cigar".

Muriel Simpson (née Chunchie) kept an archive of family and CMI photographs. Many are now held by Eastside Community Heritage Archive.

== Commemoration ==
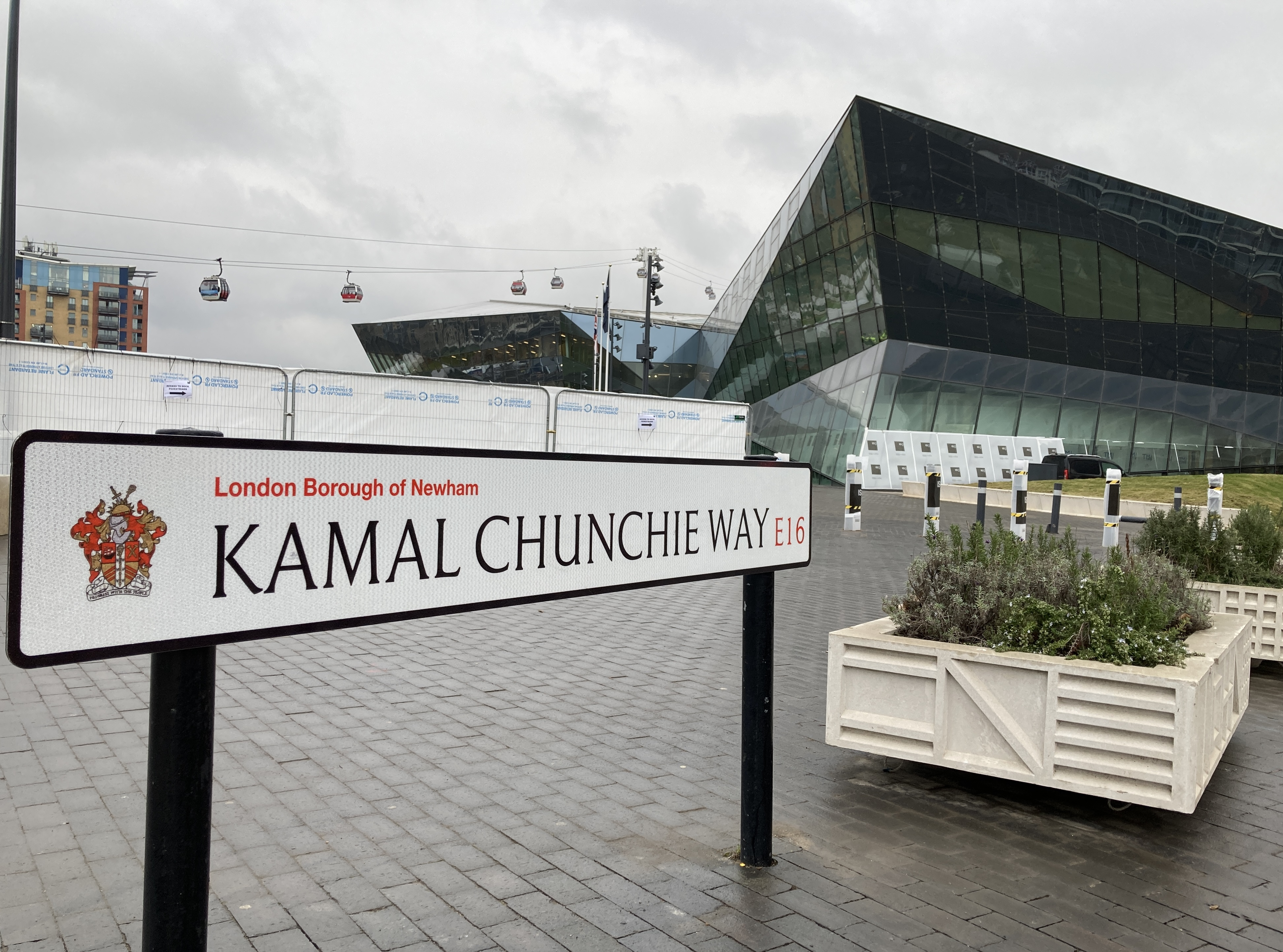
Kamal Chunchie Way

Chunchie is commemorated in the name of a street in the London Borough of Newham in east London, where City Hall, the headquarters of the Greater London Authority (GLA), the regional government for Greater London, is located.

Kamal Chunchie was one of the names included in Yinka Shonibare's 2014 work The British Library, a celebration of the diversity of the British population.

English Heritage unveiled a blue plaque in Chunchie's honour in June 2026 at Queen Victoria Seamen's Rest, 121–131 East India Dock Road, Tower Hamlets where he worked from 1922. A new wing of the Queen Victoria Seamen's Rest was opened at the same time and named in honour of Kamal Chunchie.
