= Pears Cumbria School of Medicine =

Medical school in Cumbria, England

Coordinates: 54°53′28″N 002°55′17″W

The Pears Cumbria School of Medicine (PCSM) is a medical school in Carlisle, Cumbria, England, which is a partnership between the University of Cumbria and Imperial College London, established with support from the Pears Foundation. It houses the graduate-entry medical programme of Imperial College London. It was launched in November 2023 with the goal of making a difference in under-served regions and will admit its initial cohort of 58 graduate-entry medical students in September 2025. They will graduate as doctors of medicine from Imperial College London. Students will be based at the University of Cumbria's Fusehill Street Campus in Carlisle.

The school aims to "produce doctors committed to delivering cutting-edge healthcare approaches and serve the needs of their local community", and to improve health in Cumbria and north west England. It also commits to encouraging local people to consider a career in medicine and widening access to medical education. Students will be awarded their medical degree by Imperial College. Professor Mary Morrell was appointed interim head of the new school in August 2023.

First announced in April 2022, the medical school was cited in the 2023 National Health Service Long Term Workforce Plan as a "good example" of addressing geographical inequality by "focusing new medical schools and additional places in geographical areas with the greatest staff shortfalls and unmet healthcare need". In May 2024 the NHS announced that an additional eight places at Pears Cumbria would be funded, as part of an increase of 54 places across north west England, thus bringing the initial intake up to 58 students and the rate of acceptance to approximately 5% (58/1200).

The medical school will be based at the University of Cumbria's Fusehill Street Campus in Carlisle. This was a military hospital during World War I, and later Carlisle's maternity hospital, and is a grade II listed building.
