= Julie Mennell =

Vice chancellor of the University of Cumbria

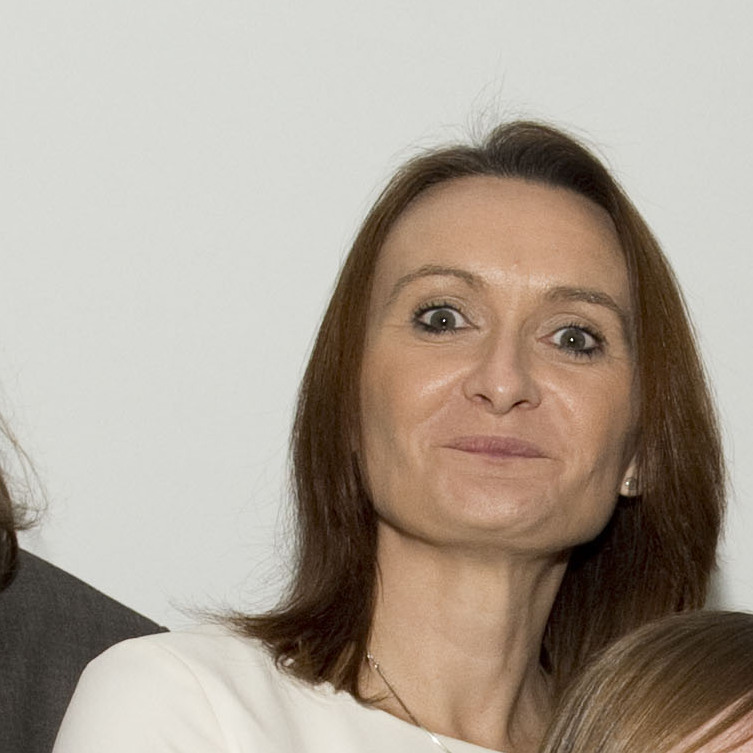
- Mennell in 2013

Vice Chancellor of the University of Cumbria
- Incumbent
- Assumed office 1 August 2016
- Preceded by: Peter Strike

Personal details
- Born: Julie Sowerby; 4 February 1970 (age 55) Middlesbrough, North Yorkshire, England
- Education: University of Leeds (BSc); Teesside University (PhD)

Julie Mennell (née Sowerby; born 4 February 1970) is an English academic and former police officer who has been the vice chancellor of the University of Cumbria since 2016.

== Biography ==
Mennell was born in Middlesbrough, North Yorkshire, England, on 4 February 1970, the daughter of Richard Sowerby and Linda Marsden. After receiving the Bachelor of Science degree in physics and mathematics at the University of Leeds in 1992, she accepted a job with the police force in Lancaster, Lancashire, and married John Mennell a few weeks later. After several years as a police officer, she returned to education and studied applied physics at Teesside University, where she received the Doctor of Philosophy degree in 1997. After her PhD, Mennell became a lecturer at Teesside specializing in forensic science, and was named as the director of the university's Centre for Forensic Investigation in 2002.

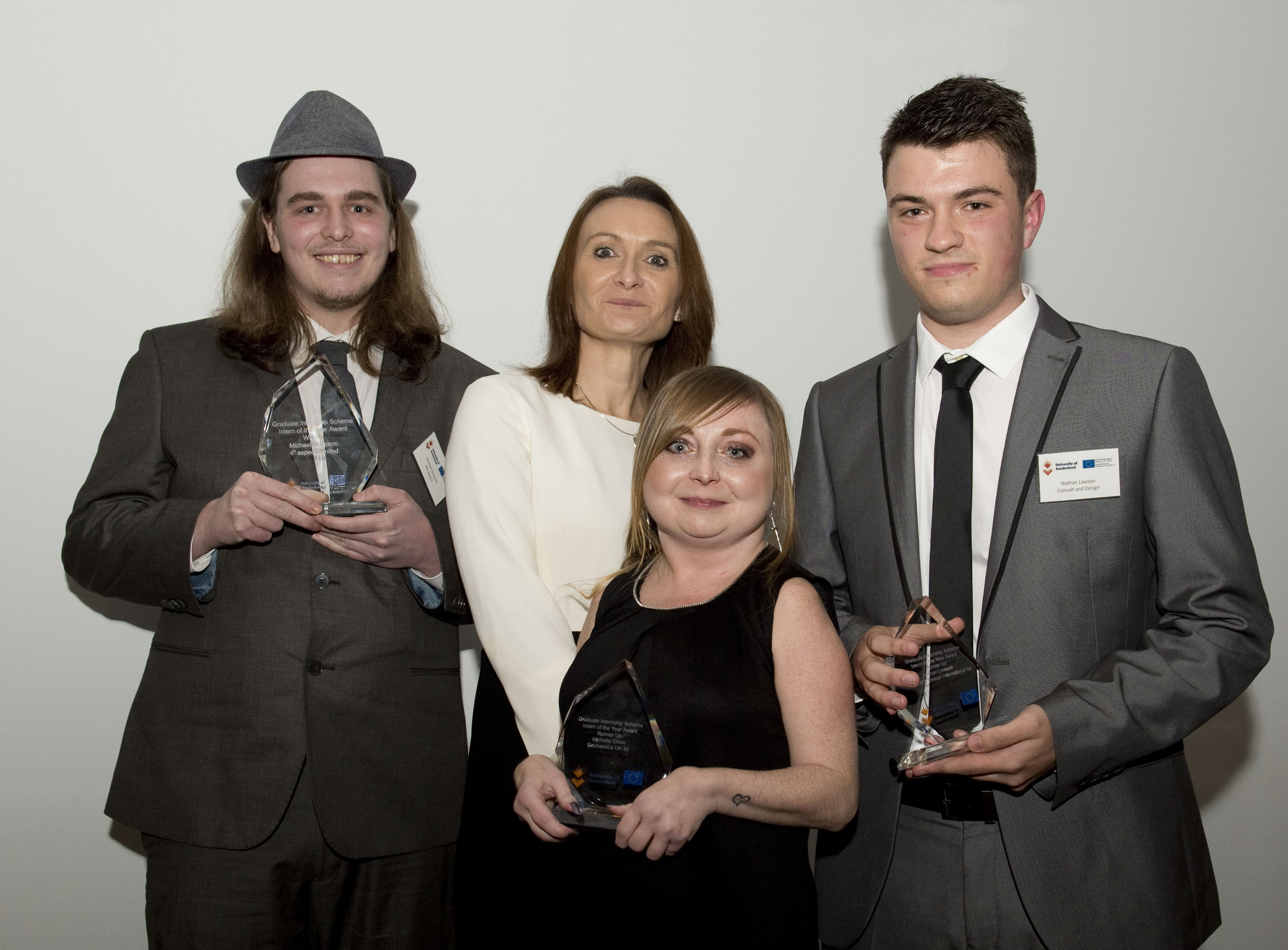
Julie Mennell with University of Sunderland graduate interns in 2013

She became the dean of the School of Applied Sciences at Northumbria University in 2006, and deputy vice chancellor (academic) at the University of Sunderland in 2010. On 1 August 2016, Mennell became the vice chancellor of the University of Cumbria, succeeding the retiring Peter Strike. She was formally inaugurated on 24 November 2016, and is the first woman to hold the position at the University of Cumbria. As vice chancellor, Mennell has overseen the ongoing development of a new university campus in Barrow-in-Furness, in partnership with Lancaster University, as well as the conversion of Carlisle Citadel into a new campus for the University of Cumbria.
