= Shirebourne brook =

Coordinates: 51°39′06″N 0°09′59″W

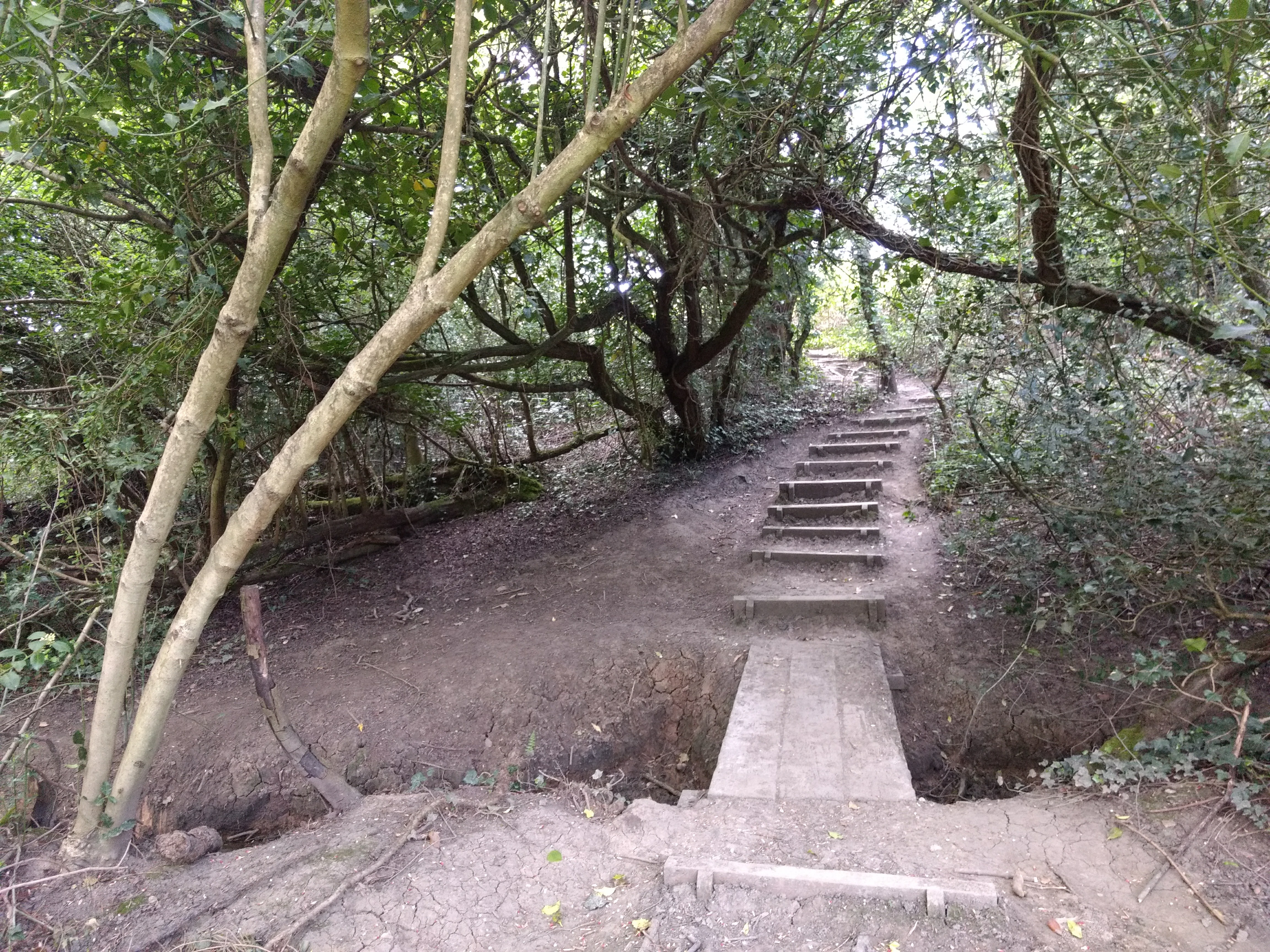
Bridge over the upper reaches of the Shirebourne at King George's Fields, Hadley.

The Shirebourne is a brook that rises in King George's Fields, Hadley, and eventually joins the Pymmes Brook. It may have marked the historic county boundary between Hertfordshire and Middlesex.

== Location ==
The Shirebourne rises in King George's Fields, Hadley. It is culverted between the eastern side of the Fields at Bosworth Road until it emerges overground at the south-west corner of the Victoria Recreation Ground in New Barnet. There it flows along the southern side of the park, and under Park Road, after which it joins the Pymmes Brook.

== In history ==
The brook may originally have been named Scirbrunan in old English which translates as "shirebourn" meaning "county stream". The name Shirebourne appears in the Barnet Manor Rolls in 1277 and the upper reaches of the Shirebourne in the modern King George's Fields were known in 1556 as Sheredyche. The manor rolls for 1699 mention a field known as Sherborne Meadow and the index to the 1817 enclosure map mentions Sherbourn Field abutting the Shirebourne. The brook may be the one that formed the county boundary between Hertfordshire and Middlesex.

== Gallery ==
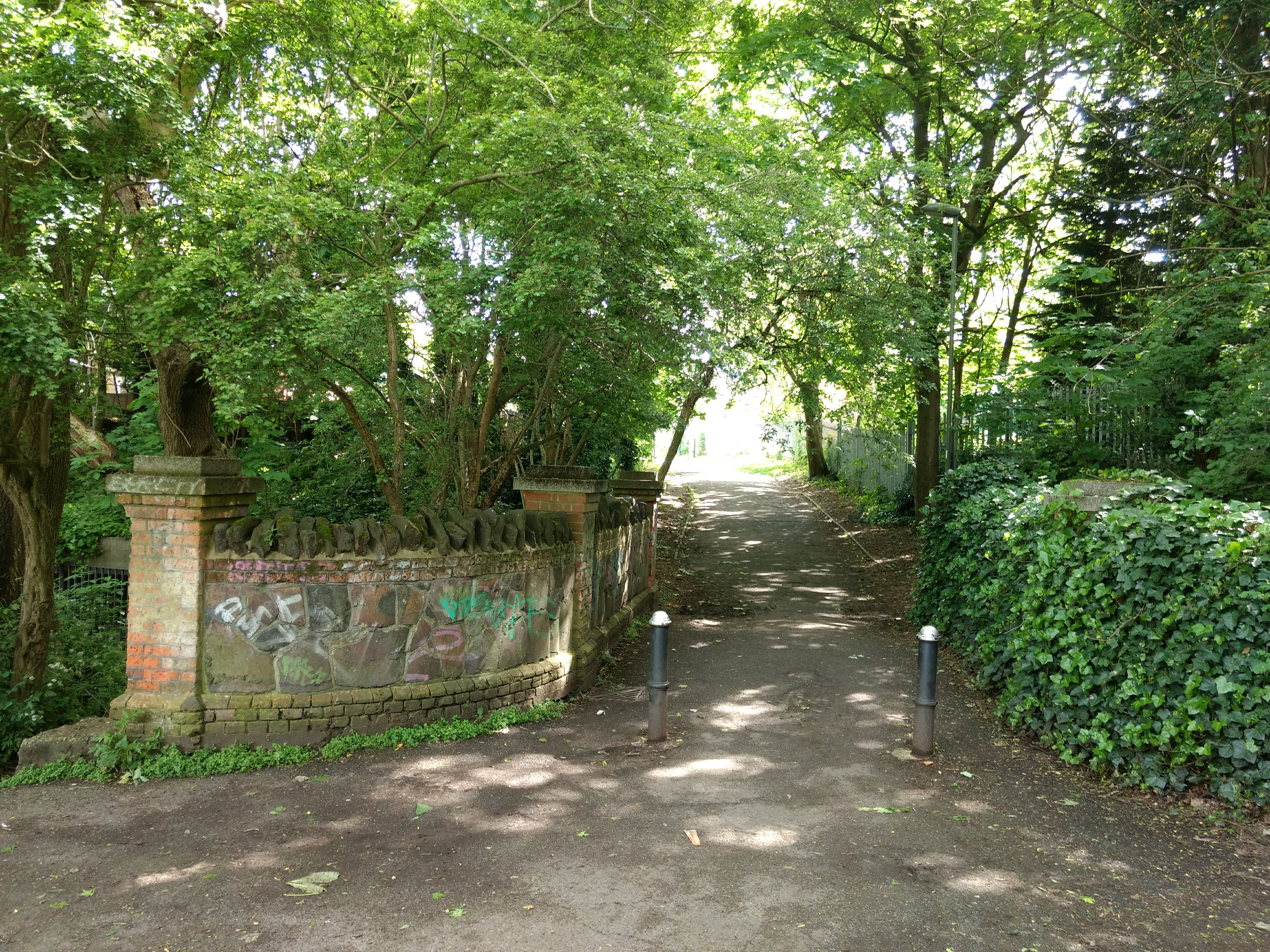
Bridge over the Shirebourne at Victoria Recreation Ground

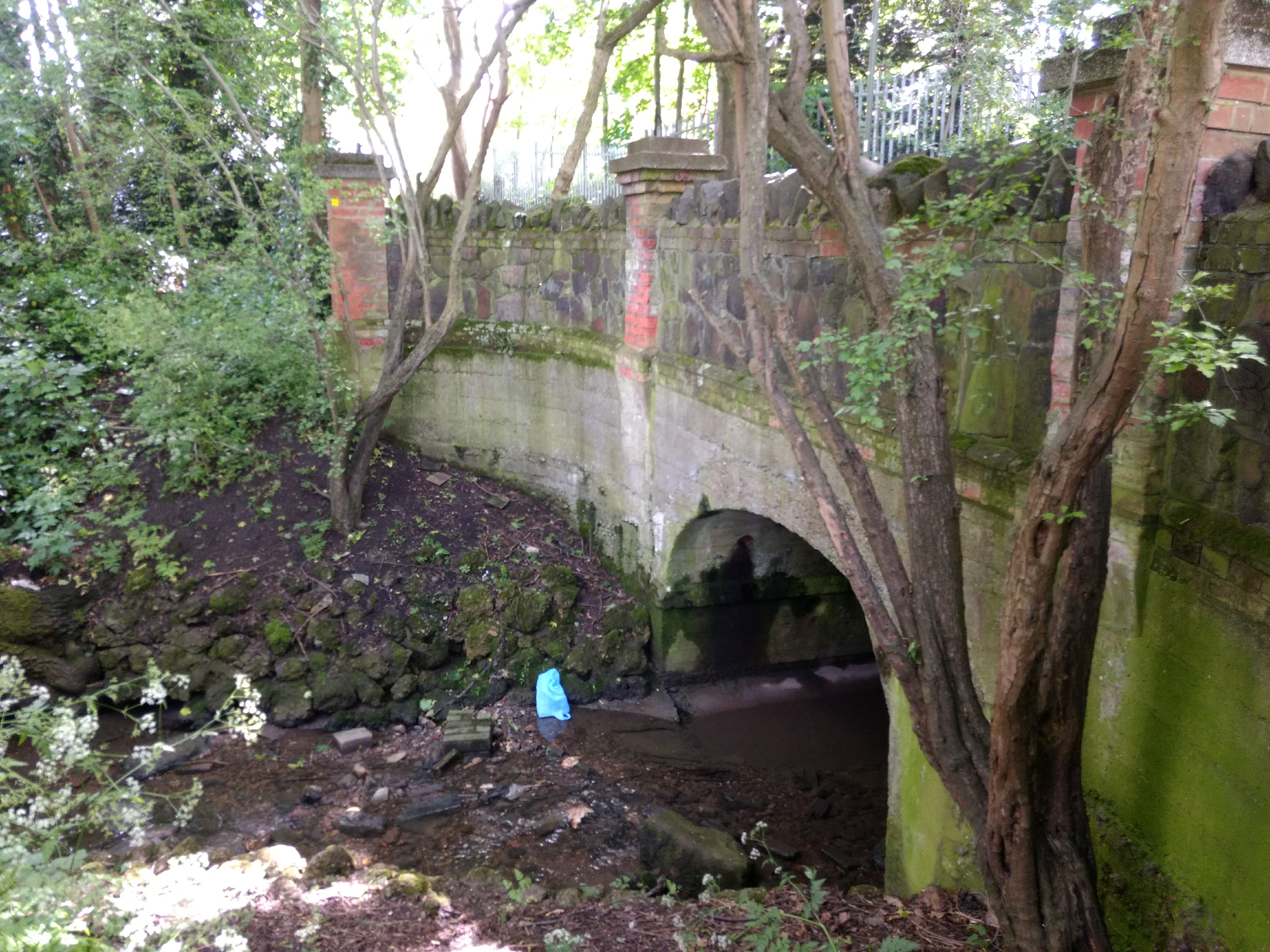
Site where the Shirebourne emerges from its culvert at Victoria Recreation Ground

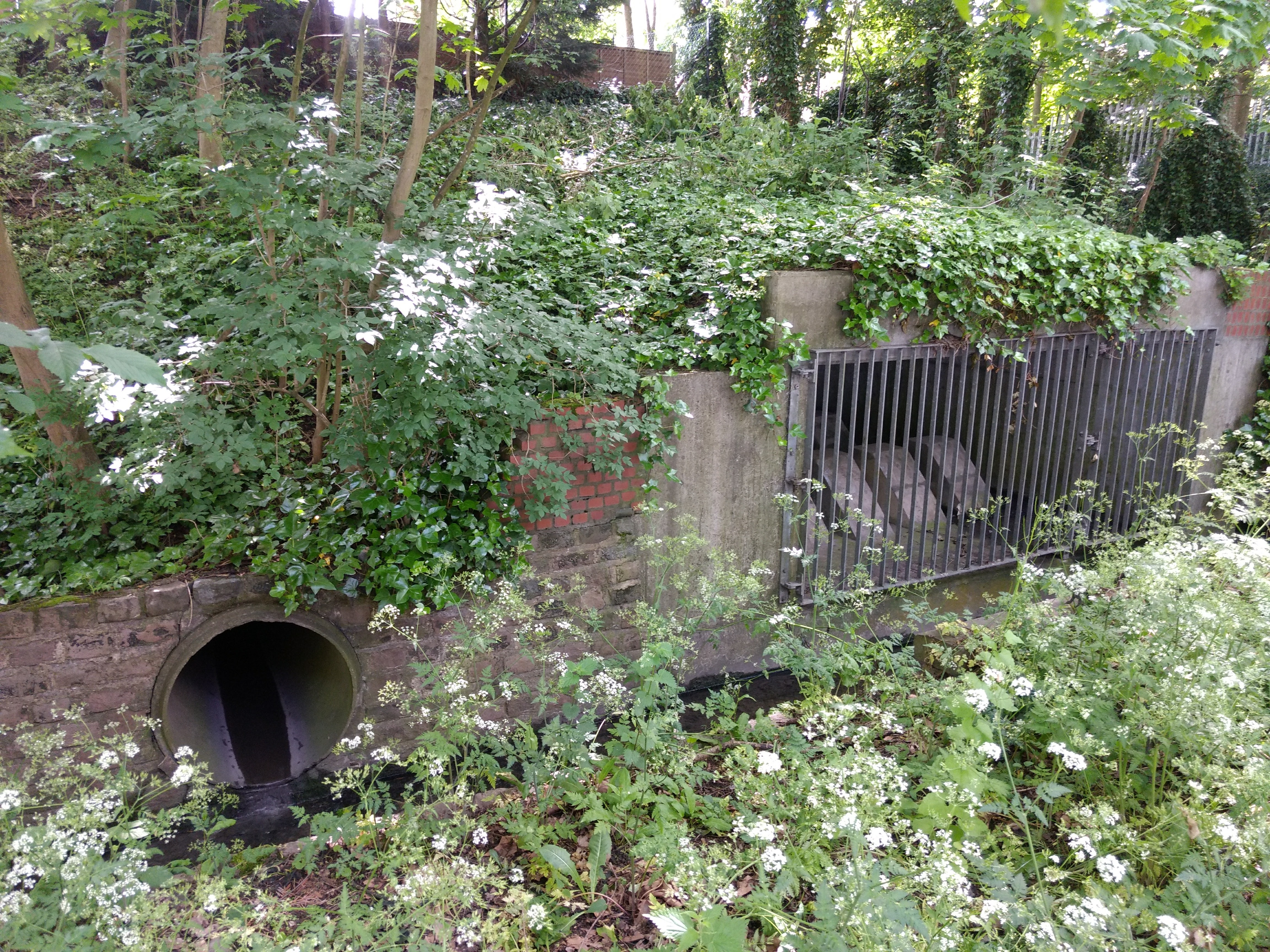
South bank at Victoria Recreation Ground
