= Queen Victoria Seamen's Rest =

UK charity supporting seamen

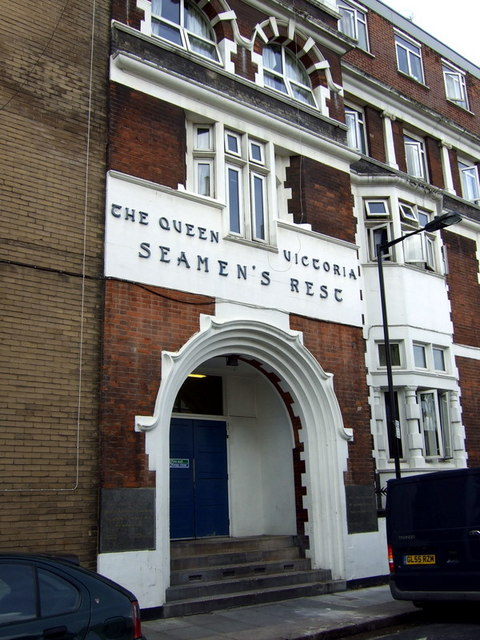
- Formation: 1843
- Headquarters: 121 East India Dock Road, Poplar, London, E14 6DF
- Locations: Poplar, London; Tilbury, Essex; London Gateway, Essex; Felixstowe, Suffolk; Bristol; Immingham, Lincolnshire
- Services: Accommodation and support for seafarers
- Chair: Sir Alastair Norris
- Chief Executive: Alexander Campbell
- Website: www.qvsr.org.uk

The Queen Victoria Seafarer's Rest (QVSR), formerly known as the Queen Victoria Seamen's Rest, is a charity founded in 1843 to support merchant seafarers. It provides accommodation, welfare services and community programmes. QVSR also supports veterans of the military services transitioning from military to civilian life.

== Services ==
QVSR provides accommodation, welfare advice, housing support, wellbeing services, chaplaincy, activities and skills-development programmes. Services are offered to active and retired seafarers, veterans, and other adults, regardless of faith or race.

== History ==
The Wesleyan Seamen's Mission was founded in 1843.

In 1887, The Magnet pub lost its licence. It was opposite the seamen's entrance to the Board of Trade office in Jeremiah Street, Poplar and the Mission rented the building and turned it into a Seamen's Rest. They bought the freehold in 1899 and demolished the pub. The foundation stone of a new building was laid by Rhoda Wyburn on 17 December 1901 and King Edward VII gave royal permission for Queen Victoria's name to be used for the Seamen's Rest. It was formally opened on 13 November 1902 by Princess Louise, Duchess of Argyll, who became its patron. Reverend David Roe was superintendent from 1902 to 1920 and his wife and daughter also worked to support QVSR and provided community services such as leading troops of Girl Guides. As well as at the QVSR building in Poplar, welfare services were provided to crews docking at the Port of London, Port of Tilbury and London Gateway.

In 1903, 42 cowboys from Texas were given rooms at QVSR after being stranded. Soon after the QVSR diamond jubilee, there was an outbreak of smallpox and a depression in shipping. 19,000 meals were provided that year and so many people asked for accommodation that some had to be turned away. People were encouraged to take temperance pledges and bible school and faith services were offered.

In November 1905, the Duke and Duchess of Connaught and Strathearn opened the Connaught floor, funded from a Nelson Memorial Fund (linked with commemorations of the centenary of the Battle of Trafalgar). By 1906, there were 60 beds, all of which were usually occupied, and 36,826 people had been supported by the Seamen's Hospital Society dispensary. Miss EJ Emery funded a new hall, opened in 1907.

From 1922, pastor Kamal Chunchie worked from the QVSR. He did missionary work and, given colour bars blocking access to jobs, housing and services, he especially supported black and Asian sailors, students from India, and local docklands people.

The Mission intended to raise money for a War Memorial Wing after World War I, during which around 20,000 merchant seafarers lost their lives, but the General Strike and Depression meant that funds and services were stretched. The shipping industry was especially badly hit by unemployment during this time but enough money was raised for a new extension, which opened in October 1932. Unemployed people held a demonstration at the opening, shouting "give us food!" and three men were arrested.

21 men from the QVSR participated in the Dunkirk evacuation of World War II. On 21 June 1944, a V-1 flying bomb destroyed all of the staff area. Another bomb fell nearby on 3 August but no lives were lost, the lodgers restored the damaged areas, and the Rest never closed.

In 1950 the building expanded again, and with a new entrance the address changed from Jeremiah Street to 121-131 East India Dock Road.

In the 1970s, many of the docks along the upper Thames closed and shore-leave for sailors grew longer so QVSR provided services for people who needed somewhere to stay for longer periods.

Rooms named for Jean Thomas, local teacher and QVSR trustee, and David Stannard, seafarer, opened in 2015.

In 2022, centres at Bristol, Felixstowe and Immingham came under QVSR management and in 2024 a QVSR lounge opened at the London Cruise Terminal in Tilbury.

In June 2026, English Heritage unveiled a blue plaque on the building in honour of Kamal Chunchie with a new wing opened at the same time and named in honour of Chunchie.
