= Bernard Pears =

Austrian-born British businessman

- Born: Bernard Schleicher; Austria
- Occupation: Property developer
- Known for: Founder, William Pears Group
- Children: Clive Pears
- Relatives: Mark Pears (grandson); Trevor Pears (grandson)

Bernard Pears was an Austrian-born British businessman, and the founder of the William Pears Group, one of Britain's largest property companies.

He was born Bernard Schleicher, and emigrated from Austria to Hackney, London, and changed his surname to Pears. The change of surname took place in November 1939, and he gave his address as 180 Fore Street, Edmonton, London.

Pears started a greengrocer business in north London, which had three shops, before he moved into property. According to his grandson Trevor Pears, "He started a greengrocer business and called it William Pears because that's a type of pear, but contrary to what some believe, there is no William Pears in our lineage."

In 1952, together with his son Clive Pears, he founded the William Pears Group.
