= Trevor Pears =

British businessman

Sir Trevor Pears
- Born: 18 June 1964 (age 62)
- Education: City of London School for Boys
- Alma mater: City Polytechnic
- Known for: Executive chair of the Pears Foundation
- Board member of: William Pears Group
- Spouse: Daniela Pears
- Children: 3
- Parent(s): Clive Pears; Clarice Talisman Castle
- Family: Mark Pears (brother); David Pears (brother); Bernard Pears (grandfather)

Sir Trevor Steven Pears CMG (born 18 June 1964) is a British businessman. He is a director of the William Pears Group, and the executive chairman of the Pears Foundation, the family foundation he set up in 1992 with his two brothers, Mark and David.

== Early life ==
Trevor Pears was born to a Jewish family, the son of Clive Pears and Clarice Talisman Castle (1933–1999), and the grandson of Bernard Pears (born Bernard Schleicher). Clarice Talisman Castle was born and raised in Lochside Street, Shawlands, Glasgow, the daughter of Abraham Castle, a dealer in electrical and wireless appliances, and his wife Hannah.

He was educated at the private City of London School for Boys, followed by City Polytechnic, where he studied law.

== Career ==
He built, along with his brothers Mark and David, a multi-billion pound property empire, the William Pears Group, founded by his father and grandfather. Pears remains a director.

Pears also oversees the strategic direction of the Pears Foundation, which is concerned with positive identity and citizenship and seeks to build respect and understanding between people of different backgrounds and faiths; investing in programmes in the UK, Israel and the developing world. The Foundation has also partnered with the British Council, the British Embassy in Israel and UJIA to fund research into treating diabetes, heart disease, leukaemia, anaemia and Alzheimer’s.

== Activism ==
In 2005, he donated £20,000 to David Cameron's Conservative Party leadership campaign. He is the chair of the Antisemitism Policy Trust.

== Personal life ==
He lives in Hampstead, London, with his wife Daniela and their three children. In 2014, Daniela Pears was appointed mayoress of the London Borough of Camden. She is also a trustee of the Jewish charity Mitzvah Day.

== Honours ==
Pears is a fellow of Birkbeck, University of London and was appointed Companion of the Order of St Michael and St George (CMG) in the 2011 New Year Honours for services to the community and UK/Israel relations. He was knighted in the 2017 Birthday Honours for services to philanthropy.
