= William Pears Group =

British property company, founded 1952

- Industry: property
- Founded: 1952
- Founder: Bernard Pears
- Headquarters: London, England
- Key people: Mark Pears, CEO

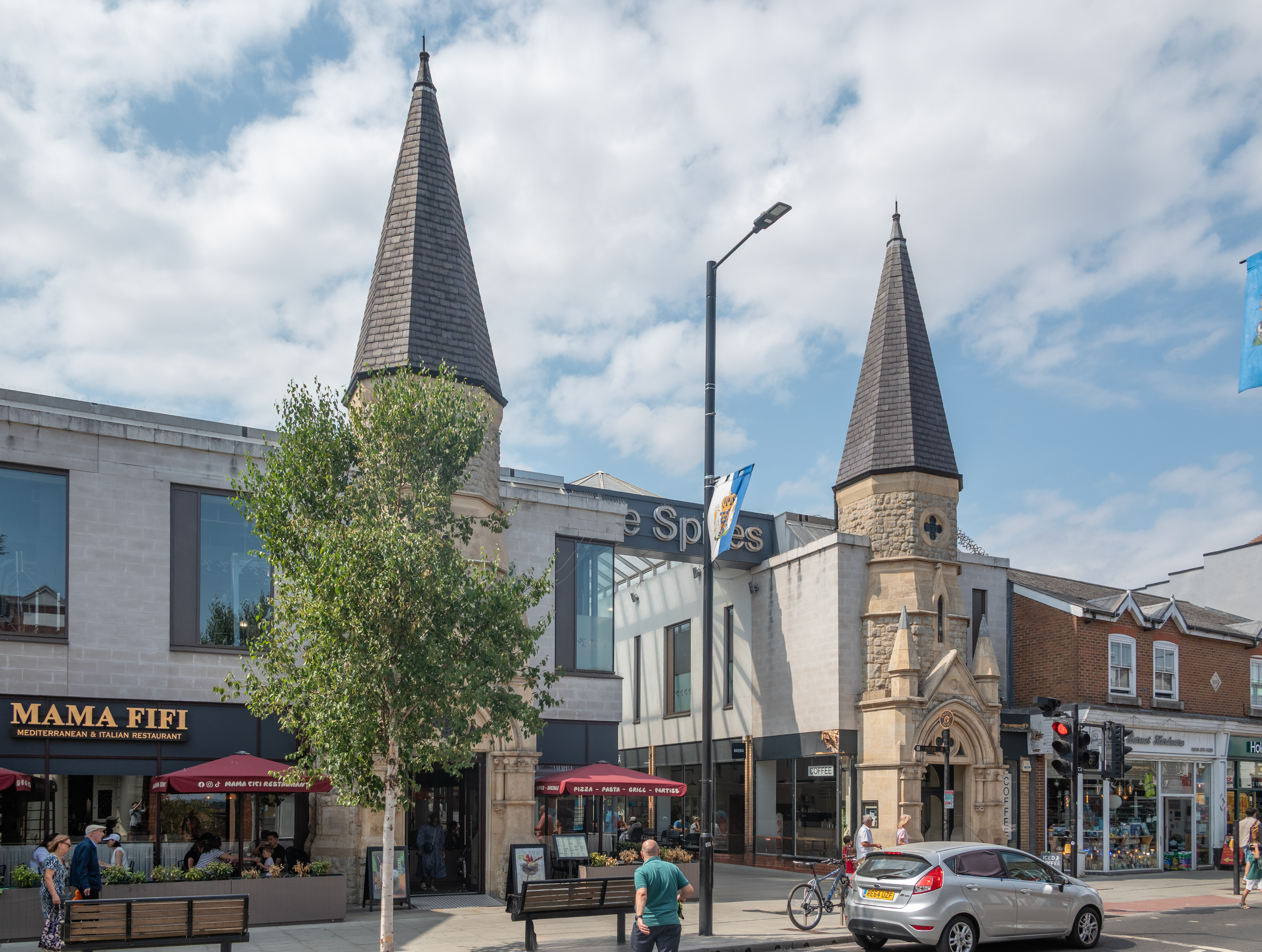
The Spires Shopping Centre, Barnet, London

William Pears Group is one of Britain's largest property companies, with £6 billion of property in London and south-east England.

The William Pears Group was founded in 1952, by Bernard Pears and his son Clive Pears. It is run by Mark Pears with his younger brothers Trevor and David. There was never a person named William Pears in the business: Bernard Pears changed his name from Bernard Schleicher to the "more English-sounding" Pears, and set up a fruit and vegetable business under the name William Pears because of the Williams pear fruit name.

According to The Daily Telegraph, Mark Pears is a director of 212 companies, a "complex labyrinth of operating and investment companies", but he will not say which is the main holding company or what the group's annual profit is.

William Pears Group owns 3–4,000 London freehold residential properties, including large areas of Notting Hill.

In 2009, William Pears Group paid £750 million to Land Securities, to buy Telereal Trillium, a commercial property management and investment company.

In April 2013, William Pears Group bought The Spires Shopping Centre in Barnet, London, from the bank UBS for a reported £34 million. The Spires has since been bought by the Canadian investment fund AIMco.

Through Pears Global, they have "up to 6,200 apartments" in Berlin, managed through a series of "letterbox companies". In 2019, a collaboration of investigative journalists in Germany, headed by Correctiv, tracked down the ownership of about 25 companies with property in Berlin to six firms in Luxembourg, who belong to two firms on Cyprus, who belong to two firms on the British Virgin Islands, who the journalists concluded to be controlled by the William Pears Group.

The Pears brothers have invested in New York City as well, through the purchase of $147 million of at least 344 unsold condominium and cooperative units in mostly 1980s-era cooperatives and one rental building, according to PincusCo Media. The acquisitions began in 2011.

== Pears Foundation ==
The Pears Foundation, formally The Pears Family Charitable Foundation, is a charity established by the Pears family "to apply some of the resources of their family’s business, the William Pears Group, to fund organisations and projects working to deliver progress on key issues affecting the wellbeing of people in the UK and all over the world". It was founded in 1992, and in the five years prior to 2012 it gave £30 million to charitable causes. A 2017 report listed it as the 31st largest foundation (and 18th-largest family foundation) by size of donations, having given £16.32 million in the year ending March 2016. In the year 2022/23 its charitable expenditure was £23.3 million, the largest donations being £5 million to the UK Youth Fund (part of UK Youth), and £1 million each to Hebrew University of Jerusalem, Home-Start UK and Samaritans. As of 2024 Trevor Pears is its full-time Executive Chair.

Organisations and initiatives supported by the foundation include the Pears Cumbria School of Medicine (a cooperation between the University of Cumbria and Imperial College London), The Scout Association, Carers Trust, and other medical projects including the Pears Building at the Royal Free Hospital, the Kent and Medway Medical School, the Clarice Pears Building at the University of Glasgow (named after Clive Pears's Glasgow-born wife, Clarice, mother of David, Mark and Trevor) and the Pears Maudsley Centre for Children and Young People in London, which is a joint project of South London and Maudsley NHS Foundation Trust, the Maudsley Charity, and King's College London's Institute of Psychiatry, Psychology & Neuroscience.

In partnership with the British Council and the UK government's Science and Innovation Network, the Pears Foundation has also played a leading role in supporting BIRAX (Britain–Israel Research and Academic Exchange Partnership), a bilateral initiative launched in 2011 to advance cutting-edge scientific collaboration between UK and Israeli institutions. Since its inception, BIRAX has funded over £13 million in joint research projects, primarily in fields such as regenerative medicine and ageing, supporting more than 25 partnerships between universities in both countries.
