= Mark Pears =

British businessman

- Born: 1962 (age 63–64)
- Education: City of London School
- Occupation: Businessman
- Known for: CEO, William Pears Group
- Spouse: Debra Groves
- Children: 2
- Family: Trevor Pears (brother); Bernard Pears (grandfather)

Mark Andrew Pears (born 1962) is a British billionaire businessman, CEO of the privately held William Pears Group since 1984.

== Early life ==
Mark Andrew Pears was born in 1962, the son of Clive Pears (died 1984) and Clarice Talisman Castle (1933–1999), and the grandson of Bernard Pears (born Bernard Schleicher). His mother, Clarice, was born in and grew up in Lochside Street, Shawlands, Glasgow, the daughter of Abraham Castle, a dealer in electrical and wireless appliances, and his wife Hannah.

He grew up in Hendon and was educated at the City of London School.

== Career ==
The William Pears Group was founded in 1952, by his grandfather Bernard Pears (who changed his surname from Schleicher in 1939) and his father Clive Pears, and is run by Mark Pears with his younger brothers Trevor and David.

Mark Pears has run the company since his father died in 1984, when he was aged 21.

In 2014, he had a net worth of £2.1 billion.

== Philanthropy ==
In 1992, he co-founded the Pears Foundation, together with his brothers. Pears is a trustee of the British Museum.

== Personal life ==
In 1987, he married Debra Groves at the Western Marble Arch Synagogue. They live in Totteridge, London.

== Honours ==
He was appointed CBE in the 2014 Queen's Birthday Honours, "For services to Business and to Charity".
