= King George's Fields (Monken Hadley) =

Park in north London

Coordinates: 51.6565°N 0.1950°W

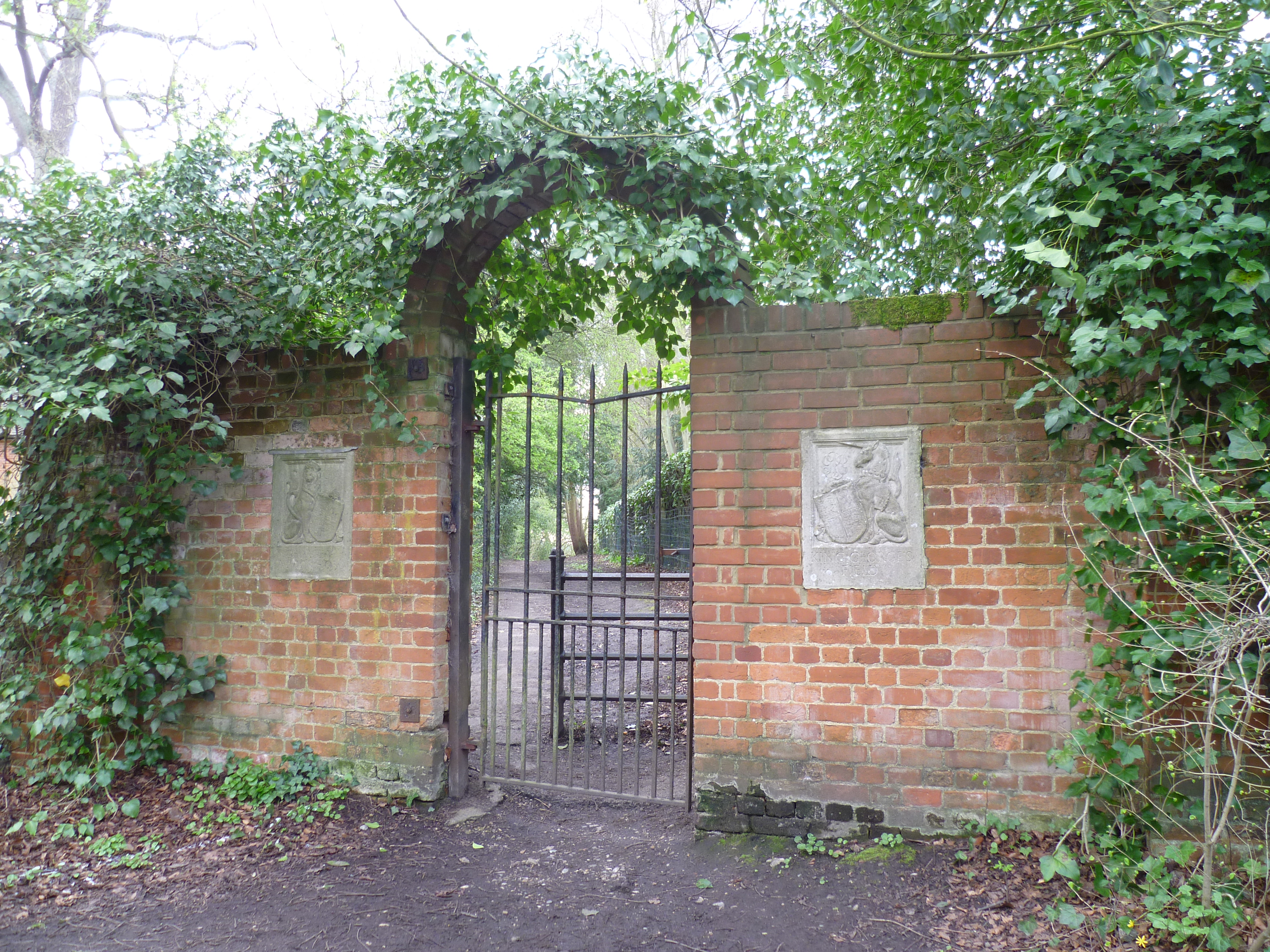
Entrance to the King George's Fields from Hadley Common

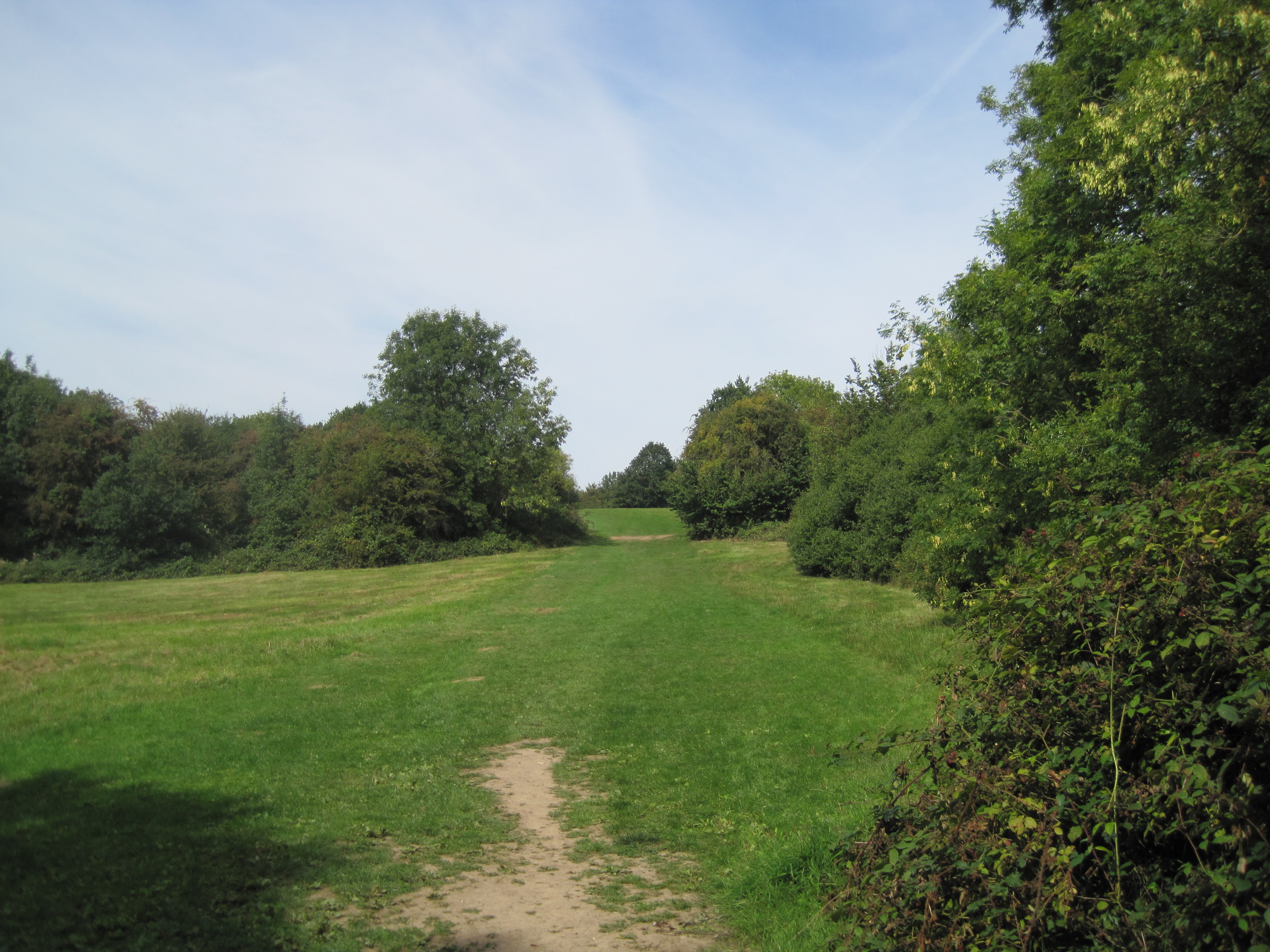
King George's Fields

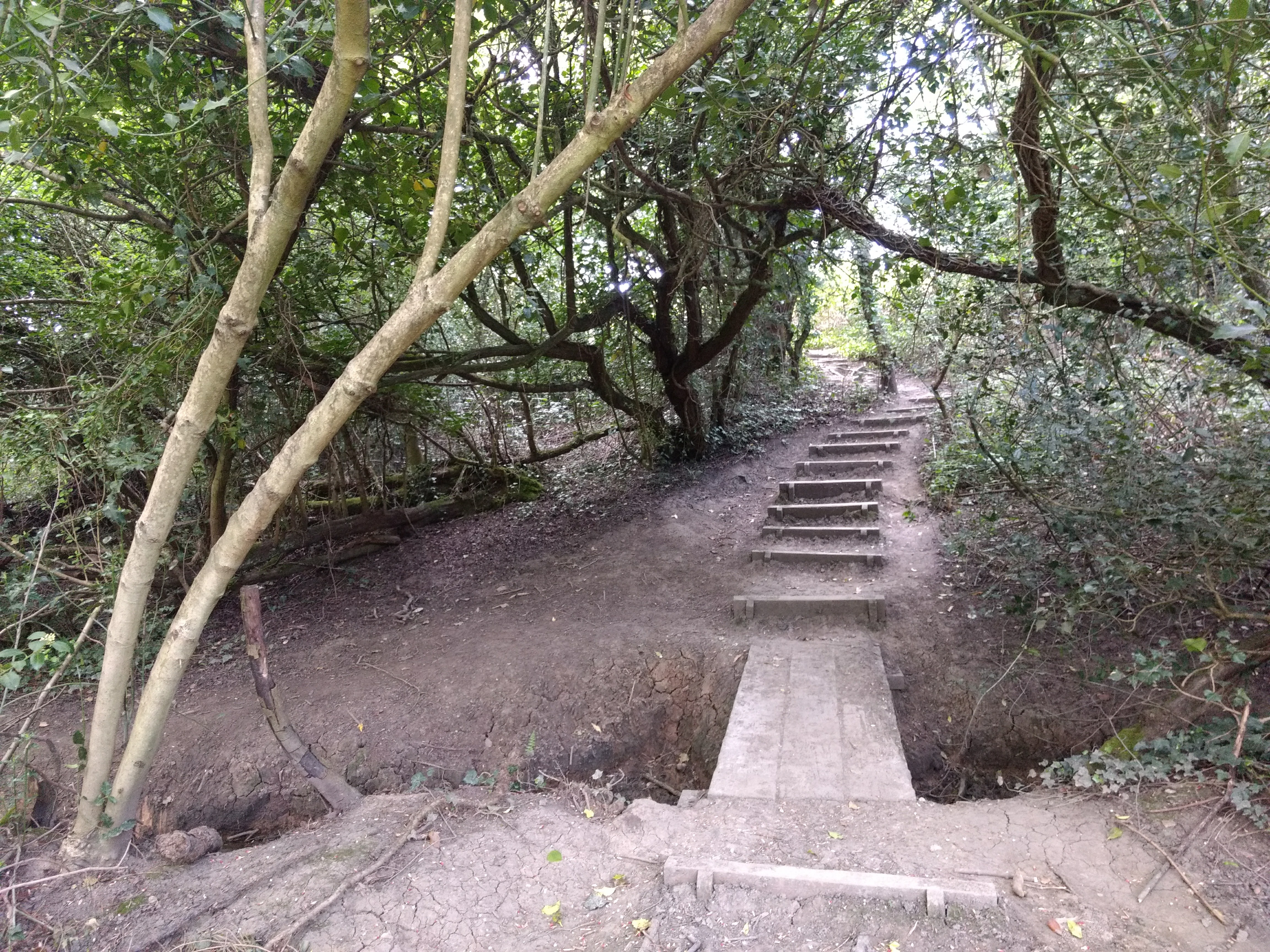
Bridge over the Shirebourne brook

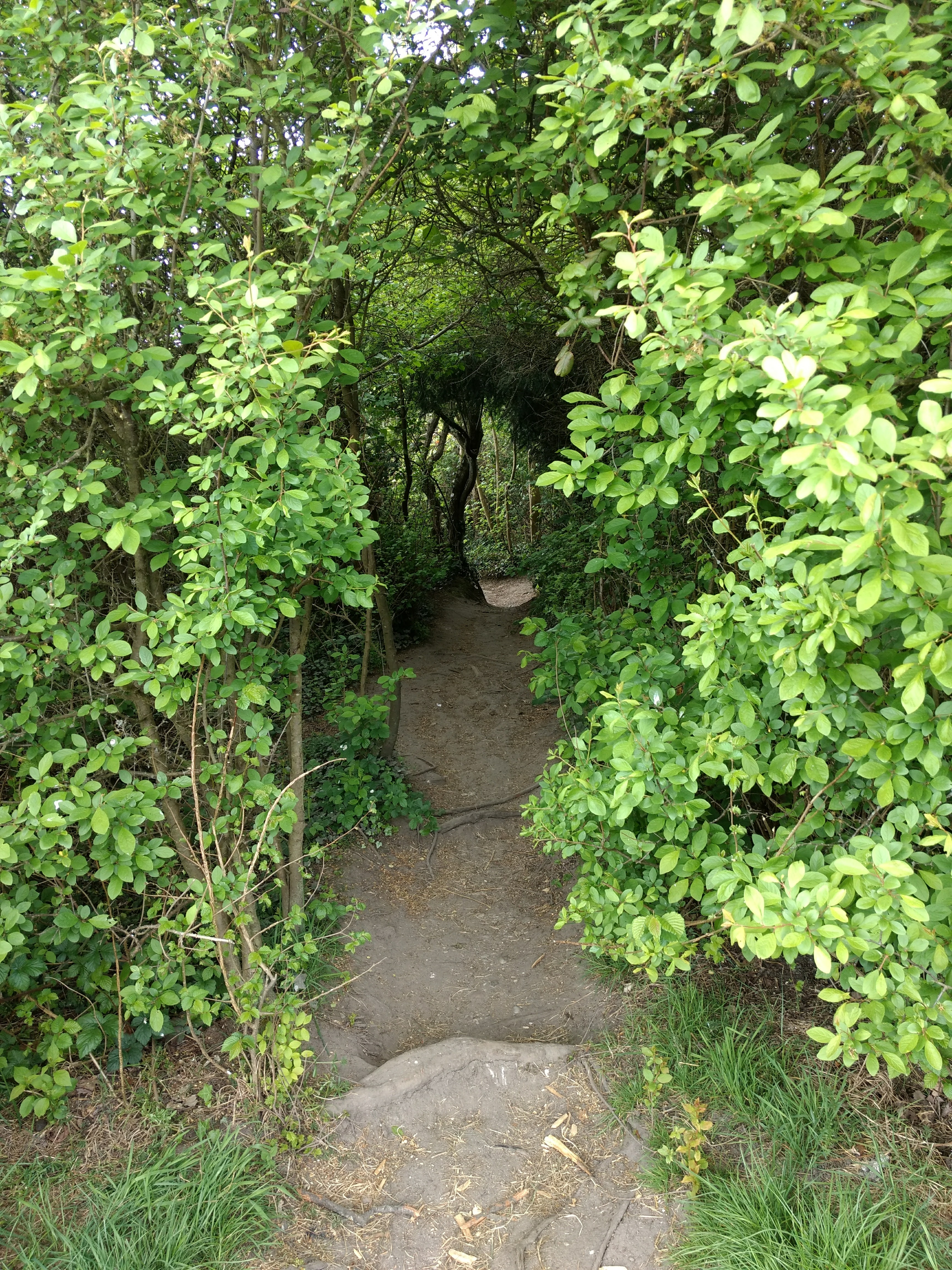
Footpath through the bushes

King George's Fields is a 28-hectare (69-acre) Site of Borough Importance for Nature Conservation, Grade II, in Monken Hadley in the London Borough of Barnet.

It is one of many King George's Fields all over the country, established as memorials, following the death of King George V in 1936. The King George's Fields Foundation was established to give grants for the establishment of playing fields, the work of the foundation is now undertaken by charity Fields in Trust. King George's Fields (Monken Hadley) has been legally protected since July 1955.

== Habitat ==
The site consists of a patchwork of fields, intersected by overgrown hedgerows, narrow strips of woodland and small streams. There are a number of magnificent old oaks, and breeding birds include sparrowhawk, stock dove, bullfinch, willow warbler and chaffinch. There are also a number of common butterflies and the uncommon chimney sweeper moth.

The Shirebourne brook runs north–south through the fields.

== Location ==
There are entrances from Hadley Green Road, Burnside Close and South Close. On the other side of Hadley Green Road is Hadley Green, the traditional site of the Battle of Barnet in the War of the Roses in 1471. The London Loop walk passes through the site.

== See also ==
- List of King George V Playing Fields in London
- Barnet parks and open spaces
- Nature reserves in Barnet
