= University of Cumbria =

Group of university campuses in England

Coordinates: 54°53′27″N 2°55′20″W

- Coat of arms
- Former names: Charlotte Mason College, St Martin's College, Cumbria Institute of the Arts
- Motto: Aspiremus efficiamus
- Motto in English: Let us aspire and achieve
- Type: Public
- Established: 2007
- Academic affiliations: Cathedrals Group; MillionPlus; Universities UK; Defence Universities Alliance
- Budget: £63.3m
- Chancellor: Stephen Cottrell, Archbishop of York
- Vice-Chancellor: Julie Mennell
- Students: 9,065 (2024/25)
- Undergraduates: 6,525 (2024/25)
- Postgraduates: 2,540 (2024/25)
- Location: Carlisle; Lancaster; Ambleside; Barrow-in-Furness; Workington; Tower Hamlets, London
Colours
- Website: cumbria.ac.uk

The University of Cumbria is a public university in Cumbria, with its headquarters in Carlisle and other major campuses in Lancaster, Ambleside, and London. It has roots extending back to the Society for the Encouragement of Fine Arts, established in 1822, and the teacher training college established by Charlotte Mason in the 1890s. It opened its doors in 2007 as a university.

== History ==
The University of Cumbria was formed from the merger of St Martin's College, Lancaster, the Cumbria Institute of the Arts (formerly Cumbria College of Art & Design), and the Cumbrian campuses of the University of Central Lancashire on 1 August 2007, which ran degree programmes accredited by Lancaster University and the University of Central Lancashire. To facilitate the change, St Martin's College applied for independent degree-awarding powers in March 2005, and was successful in July 2006, after nine months of scrutiny by the Quality Assurance Agency. Official university status, albeit without a royal charter, was granted by the Privy Council in January 2007. Authority to award research degrees was subsequently granted by the Privy Council in 2019.

The Pears Cumbria School of Medicine is a cooperative initiative with Imperial College London, supported by the Pears Foundation. It took its first intake of medical students in 2025, and aims to train doctors for Cumbria. Students will study in Carlisle and be awarded their medical degrees by Imperial College.

== Campuses ==
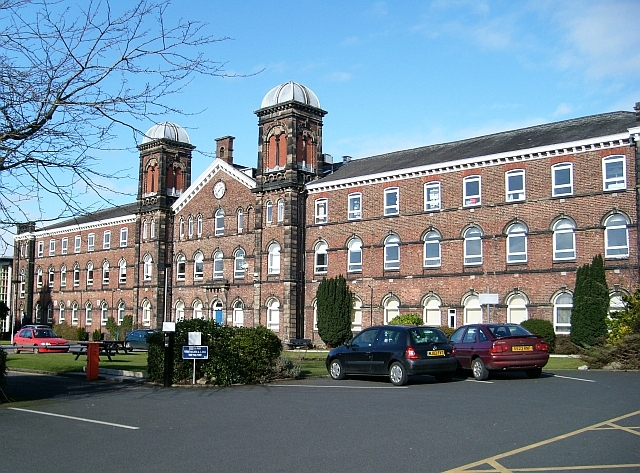
Skiddaw Building, University of Cumbria

The university is based upon the findings of a report by Sir Martin Harris. This plan envisaged a university based upon a "distributed learning network", so that teaching will take place both at the university's main campuses, and at colleges of further education around the county. This solved a problem for remote areas that did not previously have direct access to higher education.

The headquarters of the university are in Carlisle. Its other major campuses are at Ambleside, Lancaster (formerly St Martin's College) and it has classrooms and open workspace in the "Energus" facility in Blackwood Road, Lillyhall, Workington. The university previously also had sites in Penrith (formerly University of Central Lancashire in Cumbria and before that Newton Rigg Agricultural College) and London. Newton Rigg has since been transferred to Askham Bryan College and the Tower Hamlets provision has moved to East India Dock Road. Furness College in Barrow-in-Furness has developed close links with the university and they share some facilities.

=== Carlisle campus, Fusehill Street ===
The site started its life as The Carlisle Union Workhouse in 1863. After the Second World War, it became the Carlisle City General Hospital and served as such until it closed in 1999.

=== Carlisle campus, Brampton Road ===
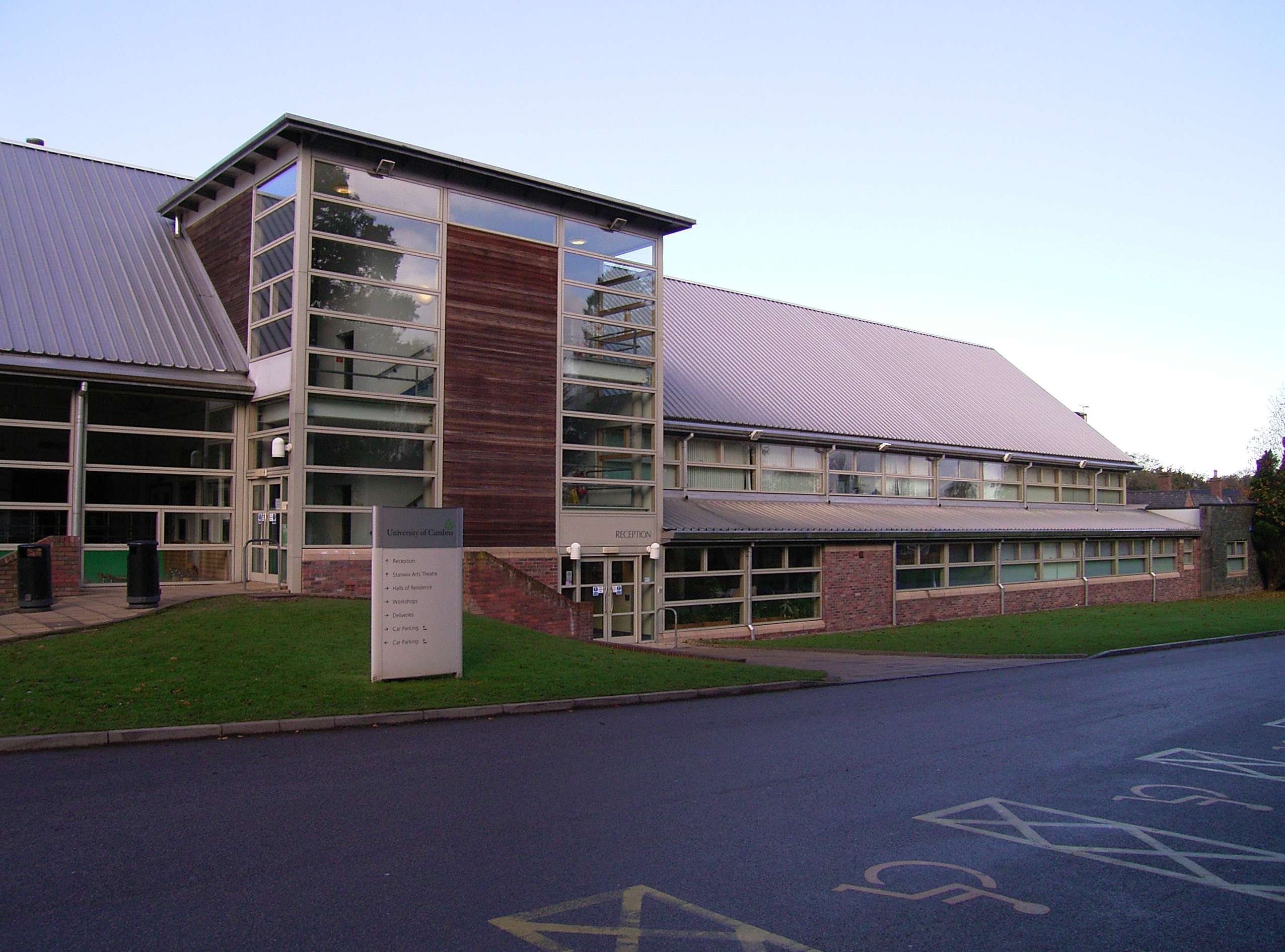
Brampton Road campus, Carlisle.

The Brampton Road campus was formerly the Cumbria Institute of the Arts, founded in October 1822 as the "Society for the Encouragement of the Arts", later Carlisle Art College and College of Art and Design.

The Brampton Road campus is now home to the university's Institute of the Arts, with over 1000 full-time arts students.

=== Ambleside ===
The Ambleside campus occupies the site of Charlotte Mason College, established after Mason's death in 1923, continuing the work of the "House of Education" she founded there in 1891. It operated independently as a teacher training college until the 1990s when it moved between Cumbria education authority, Lancaster University, and St Martin's College.

On 1 December 2009, it was announced that the Ambleside campus would be "mothballed" at the end of July 2010, and would no longer take new undergraduate students. This was in spite of support pledged from Tim Farron MP for the campus and its students. A protest was held on 1 December 2009 by the student body. The timing of the closure had led many to believe that the decision had been made some time ago.

In July 2011, the university announced a plan to reopen the campus and increase student numbers at the Ambleside campus and this began in 2014. Ambleside continues to host courses in outdoor studies, forestry, conservation business, leadership and sustainability.

=== Lancaster campus, Bowerham Road ===
The site was formerly Bowerham Barracks, the depot of the King's Own Royal Regiment (Lancaster). In 1962 it became a teaching college.

From the start, the college planned to teach degrees as well as Certificates of Education and pioneered the four year BA Hons with qualified teacher status. By 1966 the college was teaching PGCE students.

The college then developed courses in nursing and later radiography, occupational health, social work and continuing professional development courses for health professionals. Strong relationships were forged with NHS trust training departments.

The college developed further courses in humanities, arts and sport, and a mini building boom ensued in the late 1990s with the development of the Sports Centre, Humanities building, Hugh Pollard Lecture Theatre, as well as student accommodation.

=== Penrith ===
Newton Rigg College was an agricultural college near Penrith, Cumbria, England, founded in 1896 as the Cumberland and Westmorland Farm School. After joining the University of Cumbria, degree programmes including Forestry, Conservation, Outdoor Studies, Outdoor Leadership and Applied Sciences were taught there. The National School of Forestry was set up here in the 1960s and has a long history of educating forest managers, which continues to the present day. Programmes moved to their new home in Ambleside in 2013 (Outdoors programmes) and 2014 (Forestry, Conservation, and Applied Sciences).

Further education provision and assets of the Newton Rigg campus were transferred to Askham Bryan College in March 2011, but the university continued to run higher education courses there for three years.

=== Workington ===
The university has space at the "Energus" facility in Blackwood Road, Lillyhall, Workington. The facility opened in June 2009 and was the university's first presence in West Cumbria.

=== Barrow In Furness ===
The university opened a new campus in Barrow in Furness in 2025

== Organisation and structure ==
The current vice-chancellor is Julie Mennell, formerly deputy vice-chancellor (development) of University of Sunderland.

Previous vice-chancellors have included;

- Chris Carr (Jan 2007-Apr 2009),
- Peter McCaffery (July 2009-May 2010)
- Graham Upton (May 2010-Jul 2011)
- Peter Strike (Aug 2011-Jul 2016)

At one stage the university had debts totalling £13,000,000 and in March 2010, it received a cash advance from HEFCE to enable it to pay staff. It has since pulled itself out of debt and is profitable.

In 2022 the Manchester Employment Tribunal found the university to have unfairly dismissed and discriminated against a pregnant employee during the COVID-19 pandemic. The HR department was described by the tribunal as disorganised and described the failure to conduct a consultation during the redundancy situation as a wholesale failure. The employee was awarded £130,000 compensation.

== Academic profile ==
Rankings
National rankings
- Complete (2027): 123
- Guardian (2027): 116
- Times / Sunday Times (2027): 128

The university has five specialist departmental areas that offer a range of flexible, multidisciplinary courses:

- Faculty of Business, Industry and Leadership
- Faculty of Health
- Faculty of Science, Arts, Education and Society

The University of Cumbria provides education in Medical Imaging, Sports Development, Arts, Law, Education, Leadership and Economic Development, Conservation, Forestry, and the Uplands, and Mental Health and Wellbeing, among other subject areas.

== Student life ==
The majority of University of Cumbria campuses have sports teams which represent them in the British Universities and Colleges Sport leagues. Teams include: Cricket, Netball, Football, Hockey, Rugby League, Rugby Union, Badminton and Pool. All teams play their home games on Wednesdays afternoons at various University's sport venues.

== Notable alumni ==
=== Carlisle College of Art ===
- Sheila Fell enrolled at the Carlisle School of Art from 1947 to 1949
- Margaret Harrison studied at the Carlisle College of Art from 1957 to 1961
- Charlie Hunnam attended the Cumbria College of Art and Design to study performing arts
- Keith Tyson began a foundation course at Carlisle College of Art in 1989

=== Cumbria Institute of the Arts ===
- Rikki Chamberlain BA (Hons) in Performing Arts at Cumbria Institute of the Arts
- Helen Skelton graduated from Cumbria Institute of the Arts with a BA in Journalism

== See also ==
- Armorial of UK universities
- College of Education
- List of universities in the UK
