= Grade I and II* listed buildings in the London Borough of Barnet =

There are over 9,000 Grade I listed buildings and 20,000 Grade II* listed buildings in England. This page is a list of these buildings in the London Borough of Barnet.

== Grade I ==
Name	Location	Type	Completed (Note: The date given is the date used by Historic England as significant for the initial building or that of an important part in the structure's description.)	Date designated	Grid ref. (Note: Sometimes known as OSGB36, the grid reference is based on the British national grid reference system used by the Ordnance Survey.) Geo-coordinates	Entry number (Note: The "List Entry Number" is a unique number assigned to each listed building and scheduled monument by Historic England.)	Image
Church of St Jude	Central Square, Hampstead Garden Suburb, NW11 7AH	Church	1908–10	18 March 1965	TQ2551688361; 51°34′49″N 0°11′24″W	1294714	Church of St Jude More images
The Free Church	North Square, Hampstead Garden Suburb, NW11 7AA	Nonconformist chapel	1908–10	18 March 1965	TQ2544988471; 51°34′52″N 0°11′27″W	1078866	The Free Church More images

== Grade II* ==
Name	Location	Type	Completed	Date designated	Grid ref. Geo-coordinates	Entry number	Image
Arkley Windmill	Grounds of Windmill House, Windmill Lane, Arkley, EN5 3LD	Tower mill	1822–40	1 February 1950	TQ2172295284; 51°38′35″N 0°14′32″W	1359022	Arkley Windmill More images
Church Farmhouse Museum	46 Church End, Hendon, NW4 4JT	Farmhouse	Mid-17th century	3 February 1950	TQ2283189546; 51°35′29″N 0°13′42″W	1188513	Church Farmhouse Museum More images
Church of St John the Baptist	Wood Street, Chipping Barnet, EN5 4BW	Church	Mid-15th century	1 February 1950	TQ2455796463; 51°39′11″N 0°12′03″W	1359101	Church of St John the Baptist More images
Church of St John the Evangelist	Friern Barnet Road, Friern Barnet, N11 3EQ	Church	c.1891	24 February 1949	TQ2787992088; 51°36′47″N 0°09′16″W	1359056	Church of St John the Evangelist More images
Hadley House	Hadley Green Road, Monken Hadley, EN5 5PR	House	c.1760	18 July 1949	TQ2477597289; 51°39′38″N 0°11′51″W	1078824	Hadley House More images
Hadley House Stable block	Hadley Green Road, Monken Hadley, EN5 5PR	Stable	c.1760	18 July 1949	TQ2475197252; 51°39′37″N 0°11′52″W	1293470	Hadley House Stable block More images
Hadley Hurst	Hadley Common, Monken Hadley, EN5 5QG	House	c.1700	18 July 1949	TQ2533297139; 51°39′33″N 0°11′22″W	1188803	Hadley Hurst More images
Hawthorne Dene	Strawberry Vale, East Finchley, N2 9AA	House	c.1825–26	4 June 1971	TQ2669590790; 51°36′06″N 0°10′19″W	1359105	Hawthorne Dene More images
Holcombe House	The Ridgeway, Mill Hill, NW7 4HY	Villa	c.1775–78	3 February 1950	TQ2215893075; 51°37′24″N 0°14′12″W	1064845	Holcombe House More images
Mausoleum to the Philipson Family, Golders Green Crematorium	Golders Green Crematorium, 62 Hoop Lane, NW11 7NL	Mausoleum	1914–15	19 July 1985	TQ2538387983; 51°34′36″N 0°11′31″W	1064788	Mausoleum to the Philipson Family, Golders Green Crematorium More images
1–8 North Square	South Square, Hampstead Garden Suburb, NW11	House	1907–10	18 March 1965	TQ2536788498; 51°34′53″N 0°11′31″W	1359058	1–8 North Square More images
9–12 and 15 North Square	North Square, Hampstead Garden Suburb, NW11	House	1920	18 March 1965	TQ2544488553; 51°34′55″N 0°11′27″W	1191775	9–12 and 15 North Square More images
1 and 2 South Square	South Square, Hampstead Garden Suburb, NW11 7AL	House	1915–36	18 March 1965	TQ2548088310; 51°34′47″N 0°11′26″W	1192116	1 and 2 South Square More images
3–18 South Square	South Square, Hampstead Garden Suburb, NW11	Terrace	1928	18 March 1965	TQ2551988282; 51°34′46″N 0°11′24″W	1359085	3–18 South Square More images
19 and 20 South Square	South Square, Hampstead Garden Suburb, NW11	House	1930	18 March 1965	TQ2560288325; 51°34′47″N 0°11′19″W	1192125	19 and 20 South Square More images
21 South Square	South Square, Hampstead Garden Suburb, NW11	Detached house	1930	18 March 1965	TQ2562388336; 51°34′48″N 0°11′18″W	1064859	21 South Square
22 South Square	South Square, Hampstead Garden Suburb, NW11 7AJ	Detached house	1930	18 March 1965	TQ2562488355; 51°34′48″N 0°11′18″W	1064860	22 South Square
23 South Square	South Square, Hampstead Garden Suburb, NW11	House	1930	18 March 1965	TQ2561588370; 51°34′49″N 0°11′19″W	1286728	23 South Square
24 South Square	South Square, Hampstead Garden Suburb, NW11	House	1930	18 March 1965	TQ2560788384; 51°34′49″N 0°11′19″W	1359086	24 South Square
78–90 Corringham Road	Corringham Road, Hampstead Garden Suburb, NW11 7EB	House	1912–13	18 March 1965	TQ2561587688; 51°34′27″N 0°11′20″W	1078830	78–90 Corringham Road More images
101, 103–115, and 117 Corringham Road	Corringham Road, Hampstead Garden Suburb, NW11 7DL	House	1912–13	18 March 1965	TQ2558587736; 51°34′28″N 0°11′21″W	1078831	101, 103–115, and 117 Corringham Road More images
Church of St Mary	Hendon	Parish church	Mid-13th century	3 February 1950	TQ2287189561; 51°35′29″N 0°13′40″W	1359029	Church of St Mary More images
Church of St Mary	Finchley	Parish church	15th century	18 October 1949	TQ2492490524; 51°35′59″N 0°11′52″W	1287095	Church of St Mary More images
Church of St Mary the Virgin	East Barnet	Church	c.1080	18 July 1949	TQ2770794554; 51°38′07″N 0°09′22″W	1078869	Church of St Mary the Virgin More images
Church of St Mary the Virgin	Monken Hadley	Church	1471	18 July 1949	TQ2501697411; 51°39′42″N 0°11′38″W	1078819	Church of St Mary the Virgin More images
St Martha's Convent (the Mount House) with Attached Stable Block	Monken Hadley	House	Mid-18th century	18 July 1949	TQ2534097636; 51°39′49″N 0°11′21″W	1359027	St Martha's Convent (the Mount House) with Attached Stable Block More images
Henrietta Barnett School	Central Square, Hampstead Garden Suburb	School		18 March 1965	TQ2556788466; 51°34′52″N 0°11′21″W	1359028	Henrietta Barnett School More images
The Manor House	Barnet	House	Early 18th century	18 October 1949	TQ2551790047; 51°35′43″N 0°11′22″W	1188600	The Manor House More images
The Manse	Hampstead Garden Suburb	House	1911	18 March 1965	TQ2547788507; 51°34′53″N 0°11′26″W	1064880	The Manse
The Vicarage	Golders Green	House	1911	18 March 1965	TQ2555988368; 51°34′49″N 0°11′22″W	1064861	The Vicarage
Waterlow Court	Hampstead Garden Suburb	Flats	1908–09	18 March 1965	TQ2558887558; 51°34′22″N 0°11′21″W	1064889	Waterlow Court More images
Wyldes	Hampstead Garden Suburb	Barn	17th century	29 March 1963	TQ2610487138; 51°34′08″N 0°10′55″W	1359046	Wyldes More images
Wyldes Farm	Hampstead Garden Suburb	Farmhouse	17th century or earlier	29 March 1963	TQ2611887147; 51°34′09″N 0°10′54″W	1191239	Wyldes Farm More images
