= Mount House =

Mount House may refer to:

- Mount House, Monken Hadley, a house in London, England
- The Mount, Shrewsbury, a house in Shrewsbury, England
- Mount House School, a school in London, England
- Mount House School, Tavistock, a school in Tavistock, Devon, England
- Mount House Station, a pastoral lease in Western Australia
