= Wyldes Farm =

Grade II listed farmhouse in the London Borough of Barnet's hamlet of North End

Coordinates: 51.5691°N 0.1817°W

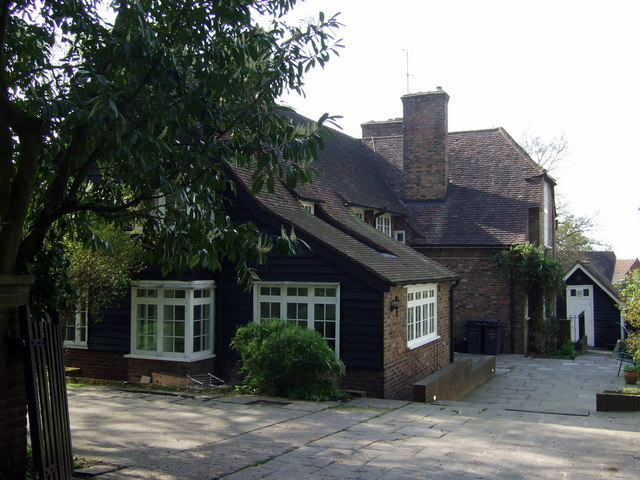
Wyldes Farm in 2009.

Wyldes Farm is a Grade II* listed former farmhouse in the hamlet of North End, Hampstead, in the London Borough of Barnet (right on the boundary with Camden), NW11.

== Early history of the estate ==
Built in about 1600, it was the farmhouse for one of two estates acquired by Eton College in 1449, soon after its foundation. The estate includes what is now the Hampstead Heath Extension. The other estate was Chalcotts, better known today as Chalk Farm.

The Eton College estate originated in grants of land by Bela, widow of Austin the mercer, in 1259 and by William de Pavely and Millicent his wife in 1273 to the hospital of St James, Westminster, which in 1321 held 124 acres of land and wood in the parish. After 1449, when custody of the hospital was granted to Eton College (in order to provide accommodation for officers of the college on business trips to London), the college took possession of the Hendon estate, which was called "the Wylde" in 1480–1. Eton surrendered St. James's Hospital to the Crown in 1531, during the Dissolution of the Monasteries, but retained the Wyldes estate until 1907, when it was sold to the Hampstead Garden Suburb trust, which had acquired some property from the college in 1906, and to the trustees of the Hampstead Heath Extension.

The farmhouse is a rare survival of a timber-framed building in London. It was weatherboarded externally, probably in the 18th century when a large barn was added to the east. Major alterations were made in the late 19th and 20th centuries, including the full conversion of the barn. In the late 1960s the farmhouse and barn were divided, and today are two separate properties known as Old Wyldes and Wyldes respectively.

== Occupants from 1824: artists and authors ==
From 1824 to 1828 it was rented by the painter John Linnell (painter) who befriended William Blake. Blake was a regular visitor to the house until his death in 1827. A portrait of Blake by Linnell shows him outside the house, with Hampstead Heath behind. Other artists including a group known as The Ancients also used to visit, the best known of whom was Samuel Palmer, who later married one of Linnell's daughters whom he first met at the house.

In 1837 Charles Dickens moved in with his wife following the sudden death of his sister-in-law Mary Hogarth. Overcome with grief, he dreamed of Mary every night in the upstairs bedroom at Wyldes. He stopped writing The Pickwick Papers and Oliver Twist, and his friends were worried he had given up writing for good. Among those who came to see him at Wyldes were Harrison Ainsworth, Hablot Browne (also known as Phiz), Daniel Maclise, and his future biographer and friend John Forster. But he soon got back to writing and returned to his home in Doughty Street after about five weeks at what was then called Collins Farm. In Oliver Twist, Bill Sikes sleeps in a field near Wyldes while fleeing from London. And in The Old Curiosity Shop, Dick Swiveller moves to a cottage in Hampstead which is probably based on Wyldes.

In 1884 Charlotte Wilson and her husband Arthur moved in. An early executive member of the Fabian Society, she also ran the Hampstead Historic Club, which mostly met at Wyldes. This Marxist study group attracted a range of radical thinkers including Fabians such as Sidney and Beatrice Webb, George Bernard Shaw and Edith Nesbit, who described the kitchen as an idealised farm kitchen, where, of course, no cooking is done. In her history of the house, Mrs Wilson lists some of the other visitors including Annie Besant, Olive Schreiner, Ford Madox Brown, and Havelock Ellis. In 1886 Mrs Wilson parted company with the Fabians and, with Prince Peter Kropotkin, founded The Freedom Group of anarchists. Among those who came to Wyldes was the Russian nihilist Stepniak. In 1895 she quit the movement, and started a programme of repairs and alterations to the house and barn, incorporating it fully into a single property.

Mrs Wilson moved out in about 1905 when the Wyldes estate, and the house, were purchased by Dame Henrietta Barnett and others, with part becoming an extension to Hampstead Heath with the further area being developed as Hampstead Garden Suburb. The designer of the garden suburb was the architect and town planner Raymond Unwin, who lived in Wyldes until his death in 1940, using the barn as his office. During his time he welcomed to Wyldes many distinguished guests including Edwin Lutyens, Jan Smuts and Paul Robeson.

A Greater London Council blue plaque, placed in 1975, commemorates Linnell and Blake at the house. A plaque also commemorates Unwin.
