= Joseph Henry Green =

British surgeon, literary executor of Samuel Taylor Coleridge

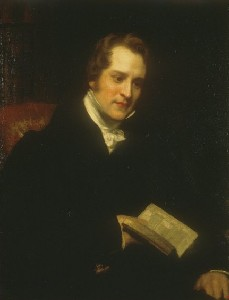
Joseph Henry Green by Thomas Phillips.

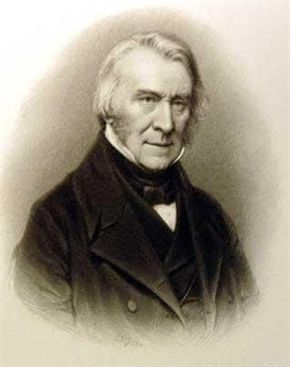
Joseph Henry Green later in life

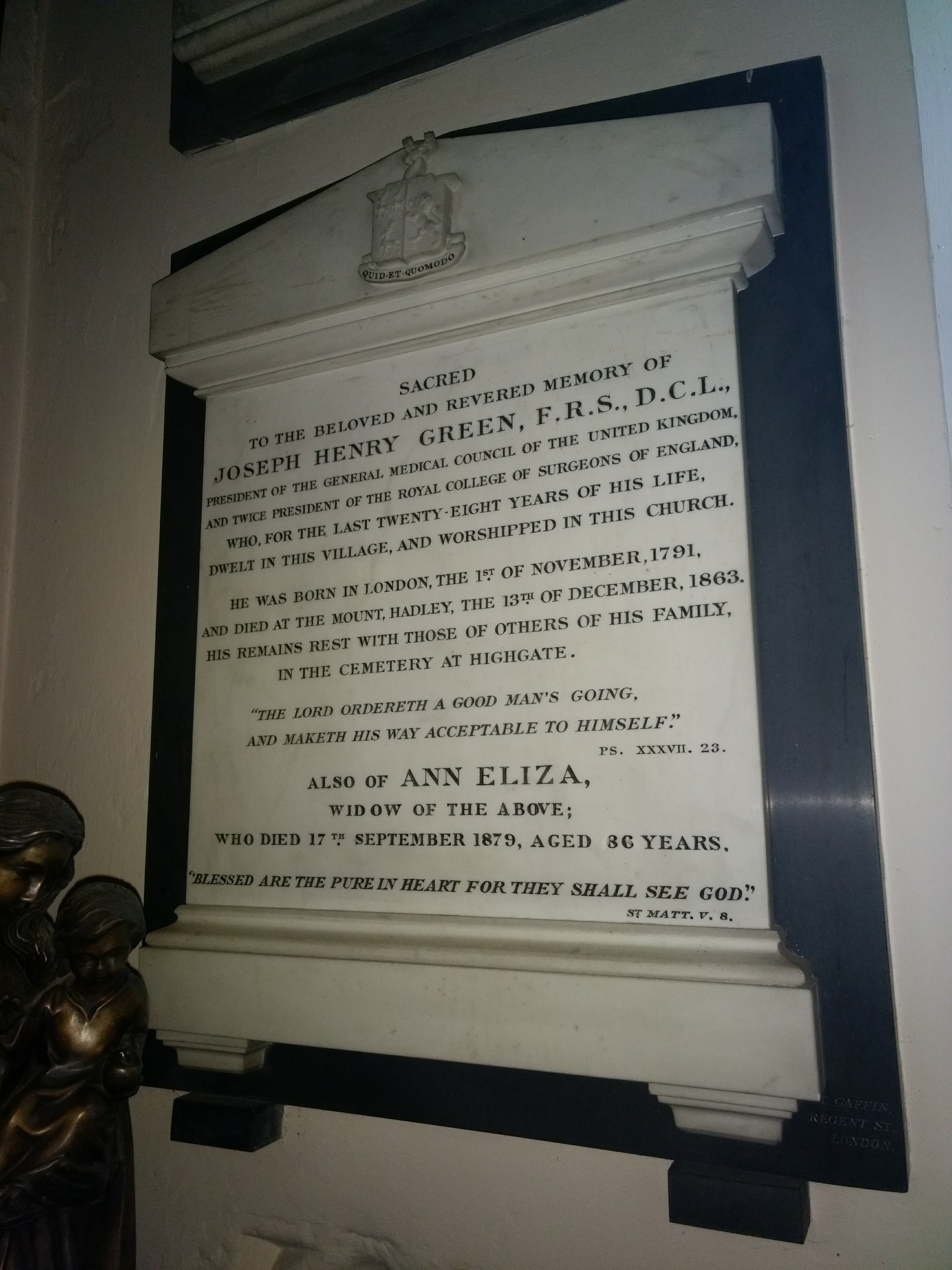
Joseph Henry Green plaque at St Mary the Virgin church, Monken Hadley.

Joseph Henry Green FRCS (1 November 1791 – 13 December 1863) was an English surgeon who also became the literary executor for Samuel Taylor Coleridge.

Green was the nephew of another eminent surgeon, Henry Cline. After studying in Germany, he apprenticed at the College of Surgeons under his uncle's tutelage. Green went on to practise as a surgeon at St. Thomas's Hospital. He was also a professor of anatomy and surgery at St Thomas's, professor of anatomy to the Royal Academy, and chair of surgery at King's College, London. Green and Coleridge became friends about 1817. When Coleridge died in 1834, he named Green his literary executor with instructions to compile and publish Coleridge's system of philosophy and dispose of his manuscripts and books for the benefit of his family. Green served twice as president of the Royal College of Surgeons and, in 1859, became the second president of the newly-established Council of Medical Education and Registration of the United Kingdom. While Green undertook a course of study, in order to publish the Coleridgean system, he made little progress other than to publish two volumes of Smith’s notes, fragments, and oral recollections in the 'Spiritual Philosophy, founded on the teaching of S. T. Coleridge' (1865). Green suffered a seizure in early November 1863 and died the next month. He was 72.

== Early life ==
Green was born on 1 November 1791, the only son of Joseph Green, a prosperous merchant, and Frances (née Cline). His mother's brother was the surgeon, Henry Cline. When he was fifteen, Green and his mother travelled to Germany where he studied for three years. There, he married Anne Eliza Hammond on 25 May 1813, the daughter of a surgeon and sister of a fellow classmate.

== Career ==
Green apprenticed at the Royal College of Surgeons under his uncle with clinical practice at St. Thomas's Hospital. In 1813, he had been appointed to the unpaid position of demonstrator of anatomy at St. Thomas.

On 1 December 1815, he was admitted as a member of the Royal College of Surgeons and set up in surgical practice in Lincoln's Inn Fields, where he remained until 1836. In autumn 1817, he went to Berlin to take a private course of instruction in philosophy with Karl Wilhelm Ferdinand Solger, to whom he had been recommended by Ludwig Tieck.

In 1820, Green was elected surgeon to St. Thomas's, following the death of his cousin, Henry Cline Jr. In 1824, he became professor of anatomy at the Royal College, delivering four annual courses of twelve lectures on comparative anatomy, using Carl Gustav Carus' textbook.

From 1818. he lectured with Sir Astley Cooper at St. Thomas's – first on anatomy and physiology and later on anatomy and pathology.

In 1825, Green was elected Fellow of the Royal Society. The same year, he became professor of anatomy to the Royal Academy. He retired from that post in 1852.

When King's College was established in 1830, Green accepted the position of chair of surgery. He had a reputation, especially in lithotomy, for which he always used Cline's cutting gorget.

== Coleridge's estate ==
Green met Coleridge in June 1817 as part of a group known as the "Friends of German Literature". The group met often at Green's house in Lincoln's Inn Fields. Green, Tieck and Henry Crabb Robinson also visited Coleridge at Highgate.

Over the years, Green and Coleridge conversed often. Coleridge included two pieces of verse by Green in his Poetical Works (Pickering's 1847 edition) dedicated to "a most dear and honoured friend".

Coleridge died in 1834 and Green was named literary executor in his will. Coleridge gave directions for his manuscripts and books to be sold and the proceeds distributed to his family. But many of the books (with annotations) were needed to carry out the second of Green's duties – the publication of a system of Coleridgean philosophy. Green was asked, in so many words, to purchase the books himself, which he did. The books were later widely dispersed. Some were held in the British Museum, a large number in the possession of Coleridge's descendants, and many others in private hands. In 1854, Clement Mansfield Ingleby in the journal Notes and Queries accused Green of withholding Coleridge's works from publication to which Green responded by providing an account of what material he held in trust.

With the aim of compiling Coleridge's work, Green undertook a course of reading, revived his knowledge of Greek, and learned Hebrew and some Sanskrit. An introduction by him to the Confessions of an Inquiring Spirit appears in the 1849 edition.

== Later life ==
Green's father also died in 1834, leaving him large fortune. In 1836, he gave up his private practice in Lincoln's Inn Fields and lived for the rest of his life at Mount House, near Barnet. He also resigned his chair at King's College in 1837. However, he retained his surgical position at St. Thomas's Hospital until 1852 and continued his share of the lectures on surgery for some of that time.

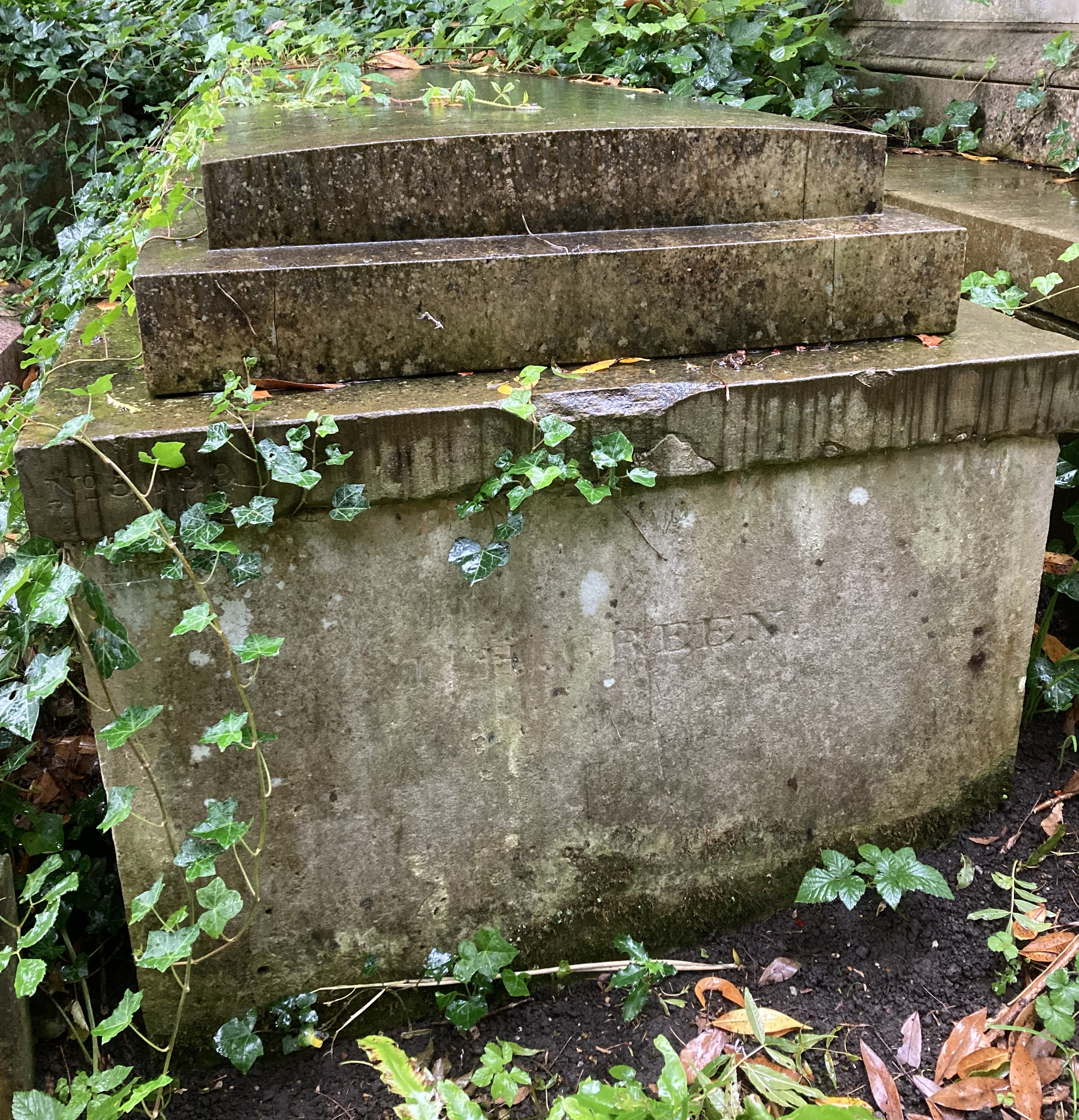
Family vault of Joseph Henry Green in Highgate Cemetery

In 1835, he was made a life member the council of the Royal College of Surgeons and, in 1946, he was elected a member of the court of examiner. He served as president of the Royal College from 1849–1850 and again in 1858–1859. In 1851, Green served as a juror, selecting the most significant or important exhibits, during "The Great Exhibition", his area of expertise being surgical instruments and equipment. In 1853, he was made Honorary Doctor of Civil Law (D.C.L.) at Oxford.

When the Council of Medical Education and Registration was established by the Medical Act 1858, Green became the College of Surgeons' representative on the council. Two years, he was appointed president of the Council following the death of Sir Benjamin Brodie.

== Death ==
Green suffered in his later years from inherited gout. On 1 November 1863, he had an acute seizure. He died five weeks later at his home 'The Mount' in Hadley on 13 December 1863. According to his friend Sir John Simon, his last words - referring to his own pulse - were "stopped".

Green was survived by his wife; they had no children. Green was buried in a family vault, plot no.5039, on the western side of Highgate Cemetery, on the left hand side of the main path between Comfort's Corner and the Egyptian Avenue.

Green's house in Hadley is now home to Mount House School.

== Works ==
- Green published 'Outlines of a Course of Dissections' anonymously in 1820. The same year, he also enlarged the book into his 'Dissector's Manual,' with plates, said to have been the first work of the same kind or scope yet published.
- He wrote no original memoirs except a minor piece in Med.-Chir. Trans. xii. 46.
- A memoir of Green's was published in the Medical Times and Gazette a week after his death.
- Two of his Royal Academy lectures, on 'Beauty' and on 'Expression', were published in the Athenæum 16 and 23 December 1843.
- When the claims made by the Cooper family led to a quarrel, Green's part in it was published in a long pamphlet ('Letter to Sir Astley Cooper on the Establishment of an Anatomical and Surgical School at Guy's Hospital,' London, 1825), which stated the legal case.
- Green published, chiefly in The Lancet, a large number of lectures, clinical comments, and cases.
- In 1832 Green gave the opening address of the winter session, which was published taking as his subject the functions or duties of the professions of divinity, law, and medicine according to Coleridge.
- Green published two pamphlets on medical education and reform: 'Distinction without Separation: a Letter on the Present State of the Profession' (1831), and 'Suggestions respecting Medical Reform,' 1834.
- In 1841, he published his advocated reforms in a pamphlet 'The Touchstone of Medical Reform'. Changes to the College of Surgeons' constitution in 1843, providing for a new class of fellows and the election of the council by the fellows, was in accord with his views.
- As Hunterian orator at the College of Surgeons in 1840, he gave an obscure address on 'Vital Dynamics', being an attempt to connect science with the philosophy of Coleridge, before a distinguished audience.
- As the Hunterian orator in 1847, he supplemented his former Coleridgean exposition with another in the same vein on 'Mental Dynamics or, Groundwork of a Professional Education.'
- Green made little definite progress with the Coleridgean system but before he died he compiled a work from Coleridge's marginalia, fragments, and recollected oral teaching in two volumes under the title Spiritual Philosophy, founded on the teaching of S. T. Coleridge (1865). It included a memoir of Green by his friend and former pupil Sir John Simon. The first chapter of the first volume had been dictated to Green by Coleridge himself and concerns a groundwork of principles. The second volume is theological.

== Attribution ==
This article incorporates text from a publication now in the public domain: "Green, Joseph Henry". Dictionary of National Biography. London: Smith, Elder & Co. 1885–1900.
