= Stępniak =

Stępniak, Stempniak, Stepniak or Stepnyak is a Polish surname. It may refer to:

- Grzegorz Stępniak (born 1989), Polish cyclist
- Jakub Stępniak (born 1991), Polish singer known as Kuba Ka
- Lee Stempniak (born 1983), American ice hockey player
- Sergey Stepnyak-Kravchinsky (1851–1895), Russian anarchist
