= Strawberry Vale Estate =

Housing estate in East Finchley, London

Coordinates: 51.6019°N 0.1698°W

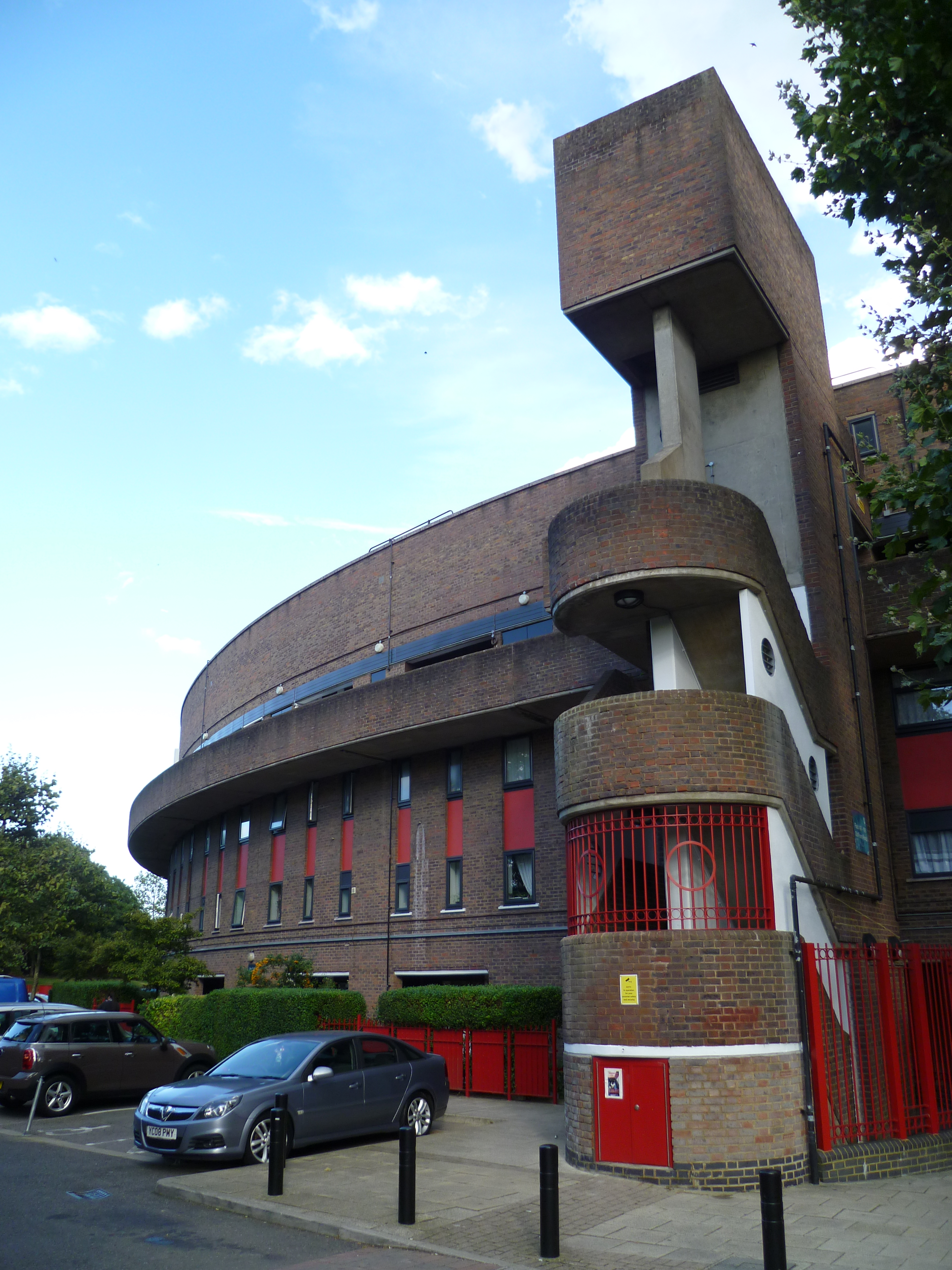
- Architectural feature on the estate

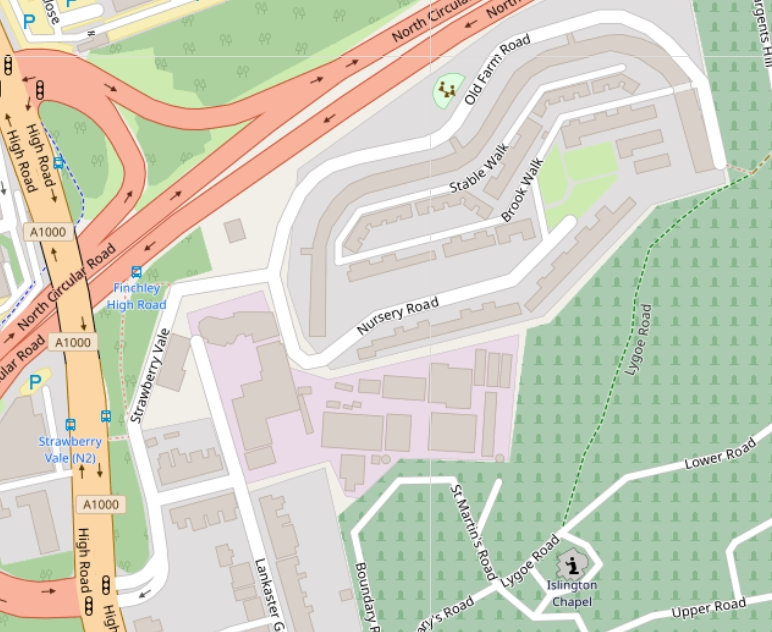
- Map of the Strawberry Vale area
- Interactive map of Strawberry Vale Estate

General information
- Area: East Finchley
- No. of units: 270

Construction
- Constructed: 1980-82
- Authority: Greater London Council

Refurbishment
- Refurbished: 2002

Other information
- Governing body: Peabody Trust

The Strawberry Vale Estate is a housing estate in East Finchley in the London Borough of Barnet, built in the 1980s alongside the North Circular Road.

== History ==
The area was originally called Brownswell. In the 17th century it was a small settlement with an inn, The Green Man, which was demolished in the 1990s. The Estate community centre is named the Green Man centre.

Until the 1960s the area was used as a farm which is remembered in Old Farm Road and had a house known as Strawberry Vale House. The Strawberry Vale Brook ran through the area. By the 1970s the house had been demolished and Ordnance Survey maps show a riding school. At one time, Evan Evans, a horse breeder of international reputation, ran his business from there. Stable Walk, Brook Walk and Nursery Road on the modern estate all refer to the area's history.

The estate was built in the 1980s and transferred to the Peabody Trust in 1998 under the Estate Renewal Challenge Fund Programme. It was the first estate to be acquired by Peabody under the programme. The estate is a mix of social housing and privately owned housing. A three-year works programme began shortly after transfer and was completed in 2002. The properties are a mixture of general needs and owner leasehold.

== Strawberry Vale area ==
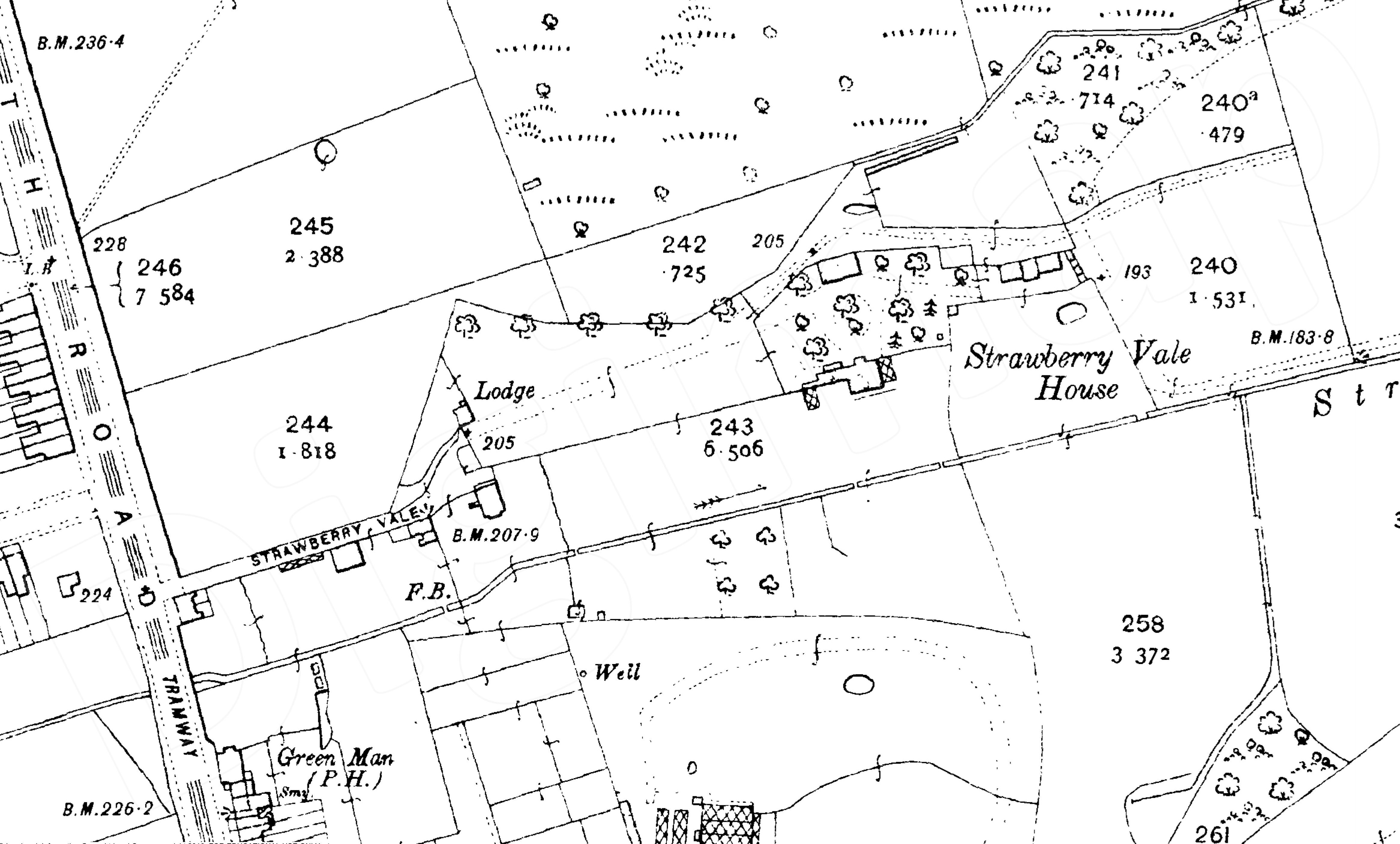
Strawberry Vale on an Ordnance Survey map of the 1910s.

Adjacent to the housing estate, bordering the North Circular Road, is the grade II* listed house Hawthorne Dene, built by James Frost in 1826 and known for its innovative construction methods. It was listed in 1962 following a campaign by the comedian Spike Milligan.

The social reformer Octavia Hill spent part of her childhood in the 1850s at nearby Brownswell Cottages and a garden at the Green Man Community Centre is named the Octavia Hill Community Garden. British and Colonial Films had studios at Newstead House from 1911 until around 1916 where they produced films such as Robin Hood Outlawed and others in the Lieutenant Daring series.
