= Hadley Hurst =

Building in Barnet, London, United Kingdom

Coordinates: 51°39′33″N 0°11′22″W

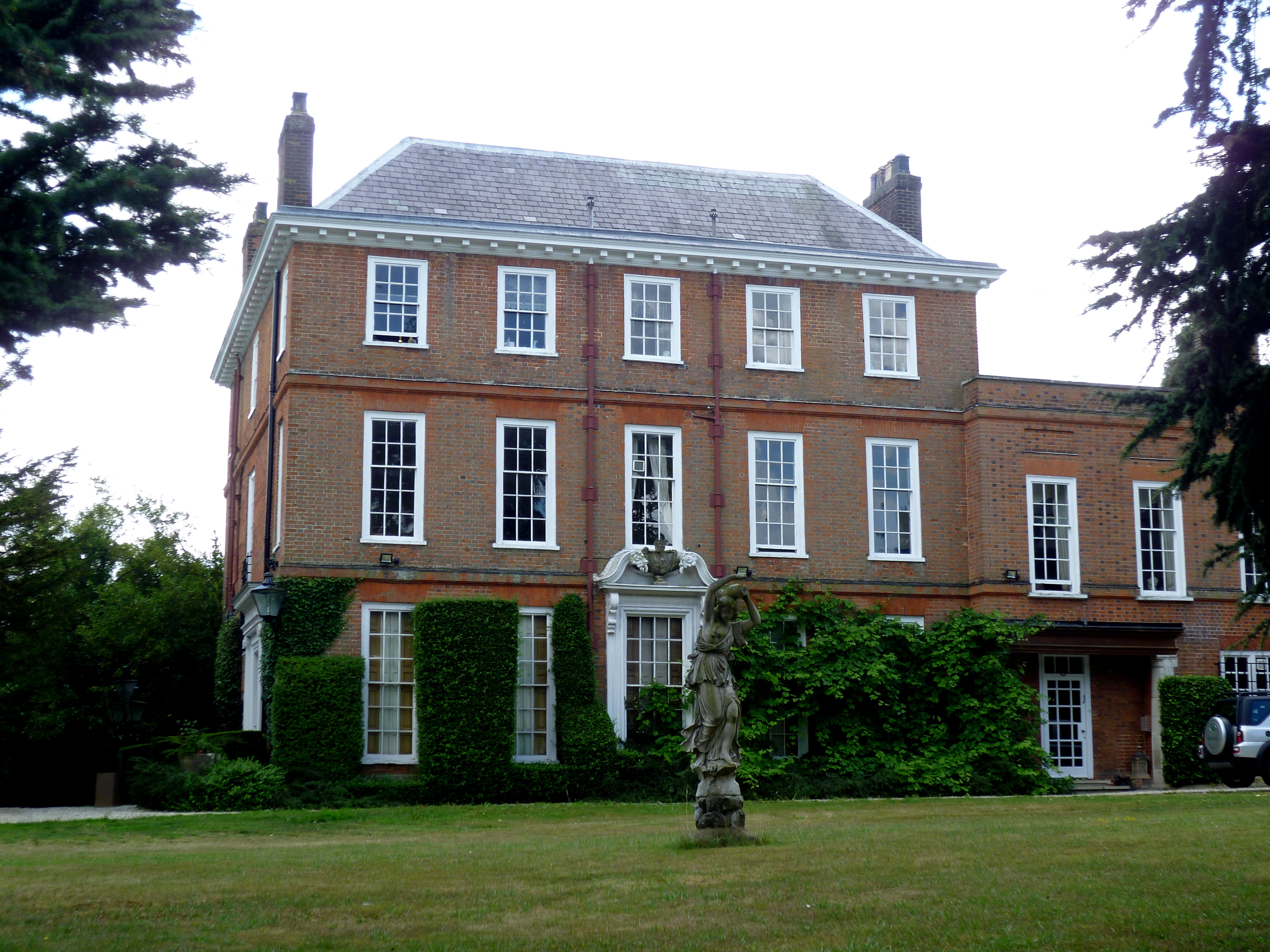
Hadley Hurst rear which faces Hadley Common road.

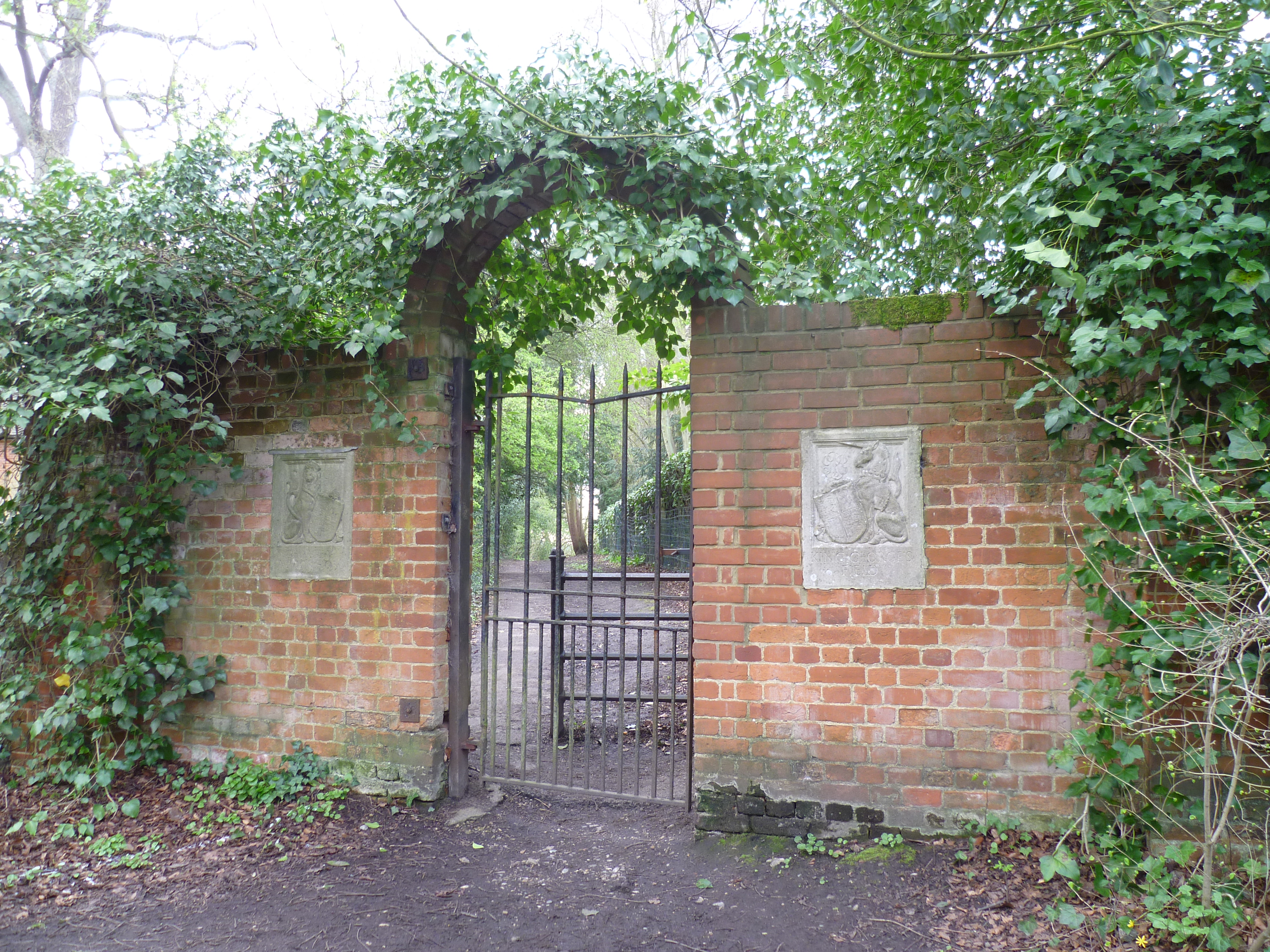
Path to King George's Field from Hadley Common.

Hadley Hurst is a grade II* listed building on Hadley Common road, in Monken Hadley, north of Chipping Barnet.

== History ==
The house was reputedly designed by Christopher Wren and dates from at least 1707. In 1936 the owner, Gordon Saunders, who at different times also lived at Monkenholt and The Chase, sold land adjacent to the house to the local council who created King George's Field recreation ground. A footpath to the field passes the house on its eastern side. The house is known for the giant cedar trees on the Hadley Common side lawn. The house faces south so that the elevation seen from Hadley Common road is actually the rear of the house.

== Gallery ==
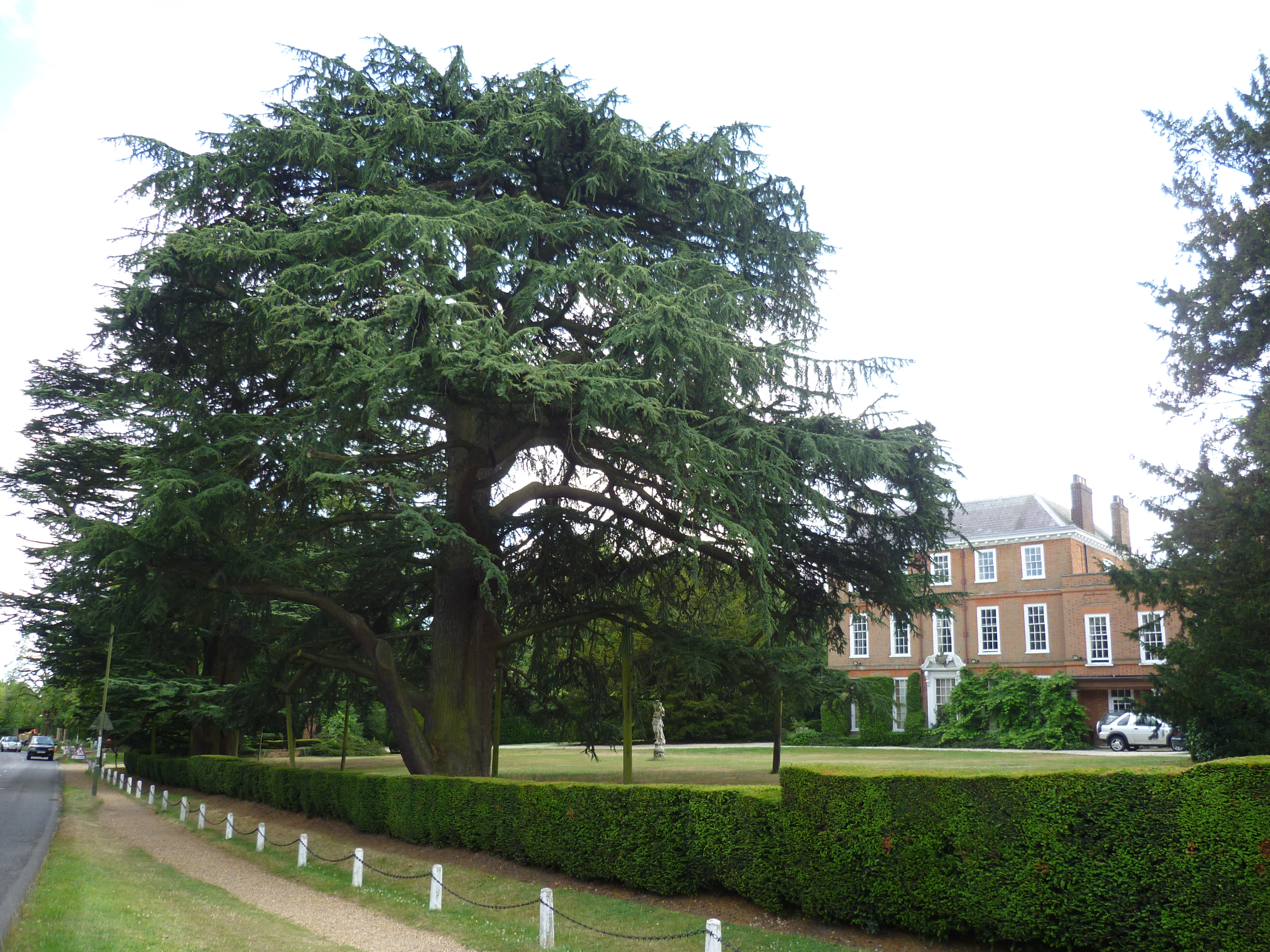
Hadley Hurst from Hadley Common road.

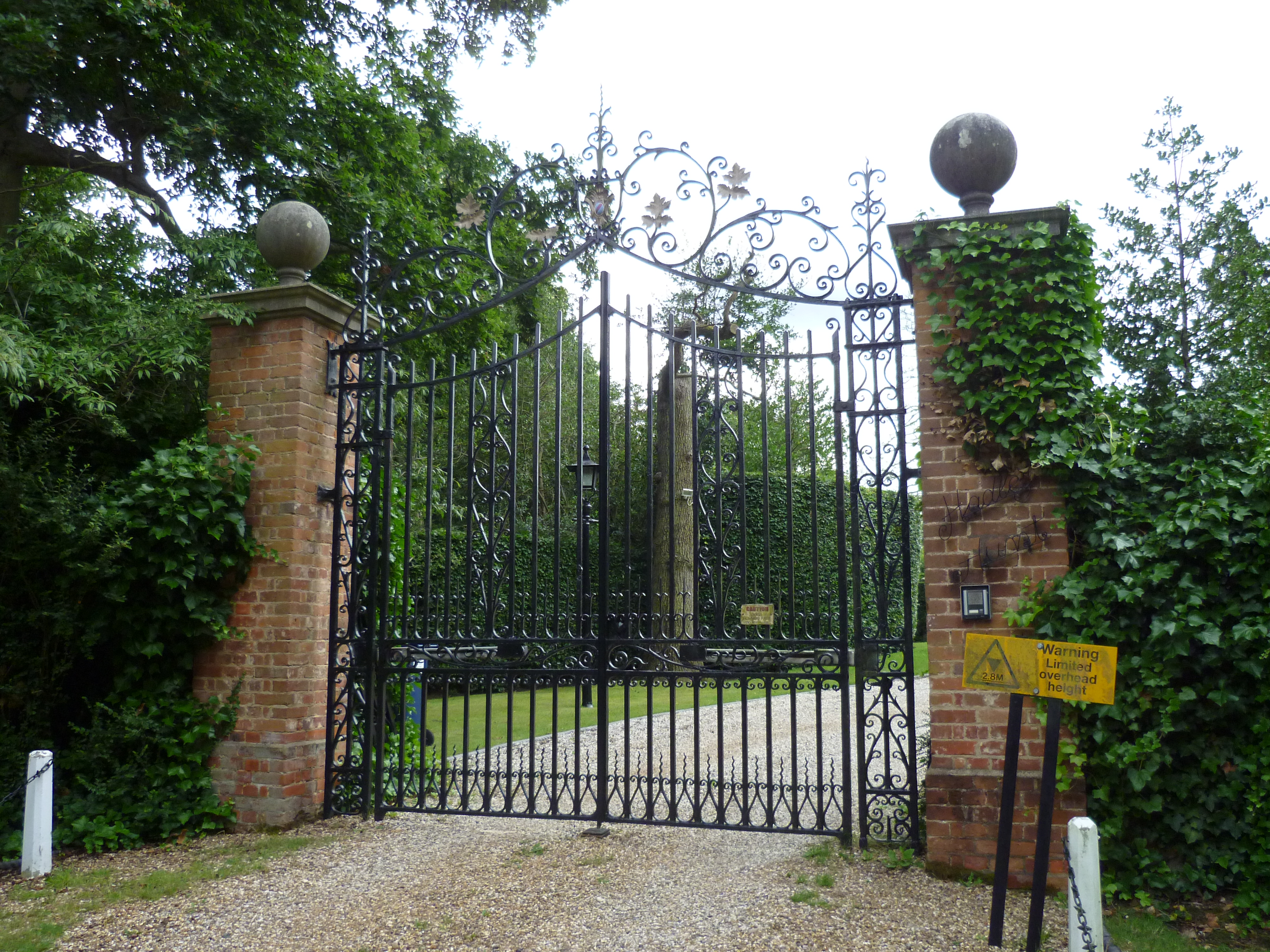
Hadley Hurst gates.

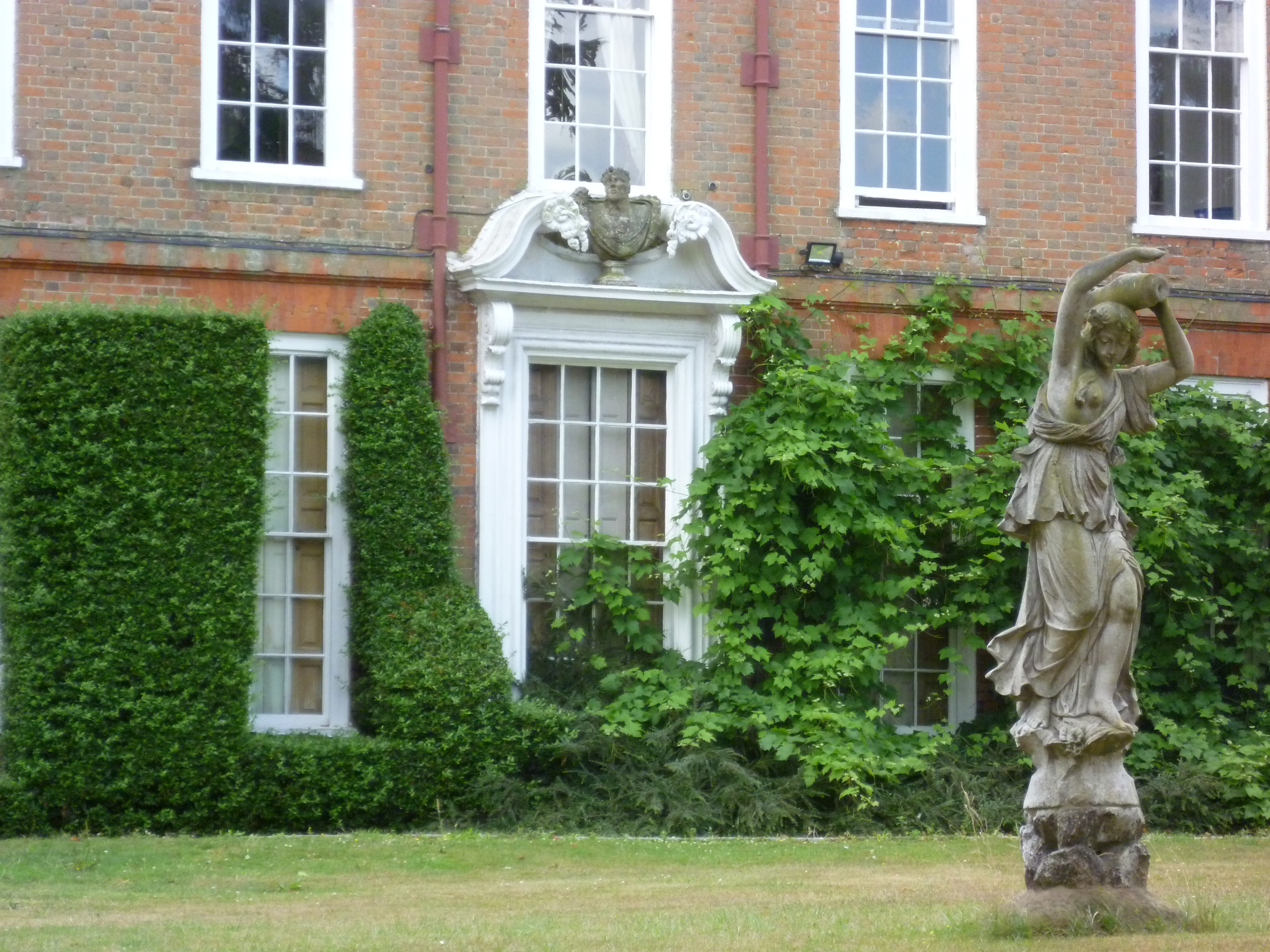
Rear elevation detail.

== See also ==
- Cicely Saunders
