= Mount House School =

Coordinates: 51.6634°N 0.1892°W

Location
- Camlet Way; Monken Hadley, North London, EN4 0NJ; England

Information
- Motto: Be You. Belong. Become.
- Established: 2017 (previously St Martha’s since 1947)
- Department for Education URN: 101374 Tables
- Head: Jon Cooper
- Gender: Co-educational
- Age: 11 to 18
- Enrolment: c. 300
- Houses: Ash, Cedar, Holly, Oak.
- Colours: Green and Gold

Mount House School is a private day school for pupils from 11 to 18. The school is co-educational and is situated in Monken Hadley, in the London Borough of Barnet. It was previously the Architectural Association School between 1940–45; and then St Martha’s Catholic School for Girls was founded in 1947 at Mount House from the mid-20th Century until 2017. In September 2017 the school became co-educational and the first intake of boys was accepted into Year 7 and the Sixth Form. The school is known for its excellent pastoral care, being able to stretch students to achieve their best including able students wanting a smaller environment to thrive, and nurture through the community atmosphere.

== History of Mount House ==
Mount House, one of the principal buildings of the school, is a grade II* listed house and dates back to the mid-eighteenth century. The attached stable block is also listed.

=== Joseph Henry Green ===
Mount House was home to perhaps the most eminent English surgeon of day, Joseph Henry Green MRCS FRCS FRS Hon DCL Oxon from 1836 until his death at the house in 1863. Green trained at St. Thomas' Hospital before setting up practice at Lincoln's Inn Fields.

In 1820, Green returned to St. Thomas's Hospital and was soon elected Professor of Anatomy at the Royal College of Surgeons before becoming a Fellow of the Royal Society in 1825. In the same year, he became Professor of Anatomy to the Royal Academy of Arts where he lectured on anatomy and its relation to the fine arts. On the establishment of King's College in 1830 Green was appointed as the first Chair of Surgery and in 1835 the council of the Royal College of Surgeons twice elected him President of the college. Having served as the first representative of the Royal College of Surgeons on the establishment in 1858 of the General Medical Council (GMC), Green was appointed its second president held this office until his death at Mount House on 13 December 1863 following an acute seizure a month earlier.

Green was also the literary executor to Samuel Taylor Coleridge and he edited the Spiritual Philosophy; founded on the teachings of the late Samuel Taylor Coleridge (1866) at Mount House.

=== Twentieth century - 2017 ===
Between 1940-45, Mount House was the home of the Architectural Association School during World War II. The house was then taken over by St Martha's School for Girls until 2017, when it became Mount House School.
