= Kuba Ka =

Polish entertainer (1986–2021)

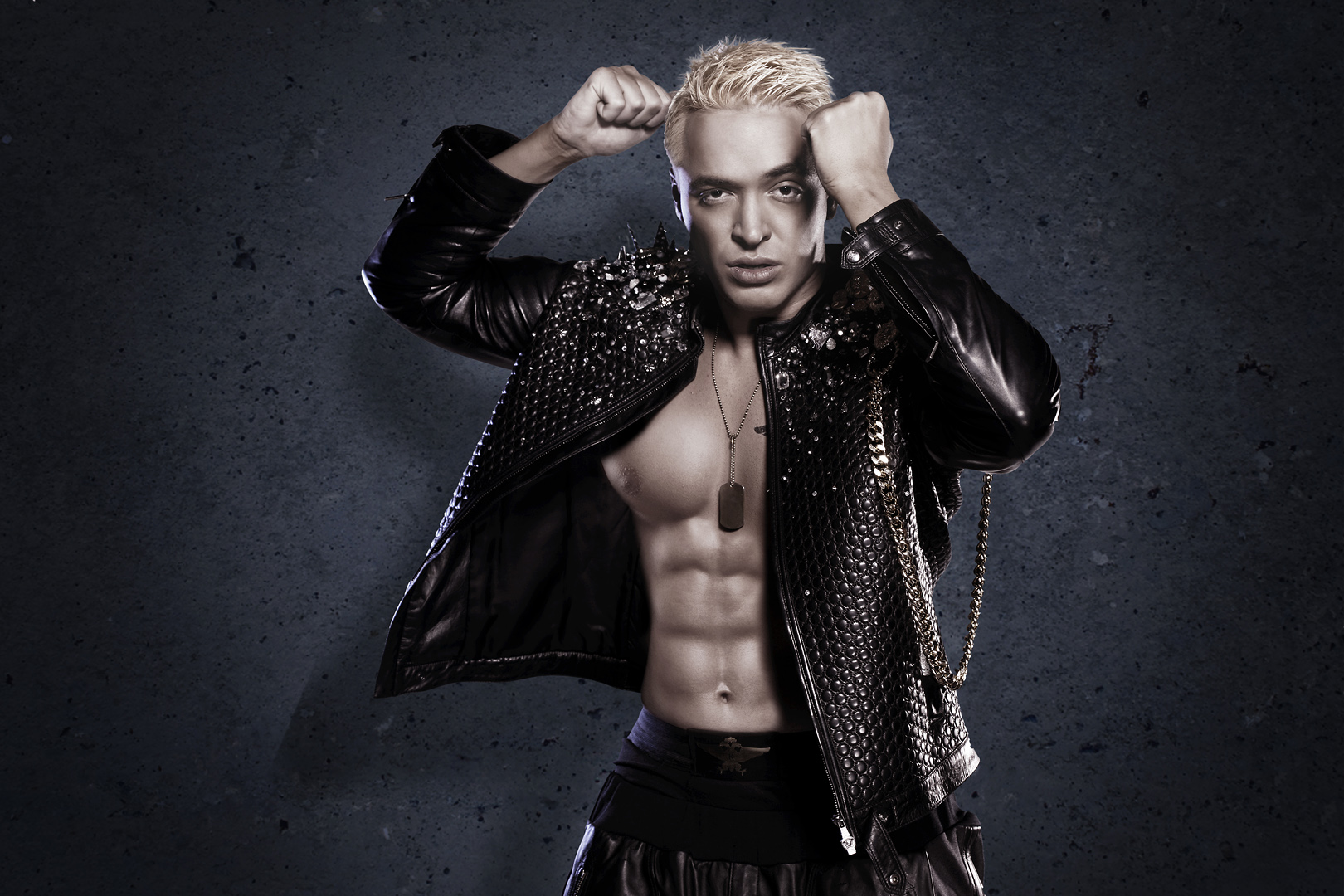
- Kuba Black Picture

Background information
- Born: Kuba Stepniak; March 28, 1986; Poland
- Died: April 23, 2021 (aged 35) Los Angeles, California, U.S.
- Genres: Pop; Hip hop
- Occupations: Performer, Dancer, Wrestler
- Label: Universal

Kuba Ka (March 28, 1986 – April 23, 2021) was a Polish entertainer, wrestler, singer and actor. He had recorded or performed with Sean Garrett, Flavor Flav, and Laurieann Gibson, among others.

== Career ==
In July 2010 Frank DiLeo began managing Kuba. DiLeo previously collaborated with Michael Jackson, Prince and Richie Sambora.

After DiLeo's death in 2011, La Toya Jackson, Michael Jackson's sister, managed Kuba and he signed with Universal Music Group. That year Kuba won a Yacht Film Festival award for his music video, Streets of Freedom. Kuba released his first single, "In the Streets," with Universal on March 20, 2012. Kuba released "Come to America," a single that featured Flavor Flav, a rapper from the group Public Enemy, in July of that year. The single was featured on his EP, Combat. Kuba partnered with Sean Garrett, a songwriter and producer, to produce the single "Stop Feenin" in 2013. Kuba released his third album at a 2014 charity event for the Face Forward Foundation, a charity for victims of violence, at The Peninsula Hotel in Beverly Hills. At the event, Kuba also unveiled the creation of the first pop artist superhero with Versace. He was also a guest on Jake Steinfeld's talk show, Healthy Living.

In 2014, Kuba was featured in a calendar with Apollo Male Models Magazine, a male fitness and fashion model magazine. The magazine also featured Kuba on the cover of its winter edition.

Kuba played the European gangster Prince, Krol in Live Nude Girls, an action comedy written by In Living Color actor Jay Leggett and Indie writer/producer, Mike Hatton, who also stars in the film alongside Dave Foley and Andy Dick. Live Nude Girls was Kuba's first American film and his 2014 Hip Hop, RnB, single 'Stop Feenin' was featured on the movie soundtrack. Kuba Ka was cast by actor/director for the role as 'Krol'. Kuba Ka remembered Jay Leggett on the red carpet of the 'Live Nude Girls' movie premiere held on August 12, 2014 at the Palace Theater, located at the Avalon, Hollywood. He spoke about the powerful impression he had of Leggett after meeting him for the first time and honored the actor/director for giving him his first big acting gig in the U.S.

In 2015, Kuba was featured in a rockumentary on the E! Channel series New Money.

Kuba died in April 2021 due to methadone toxicity.

== Filmography ==
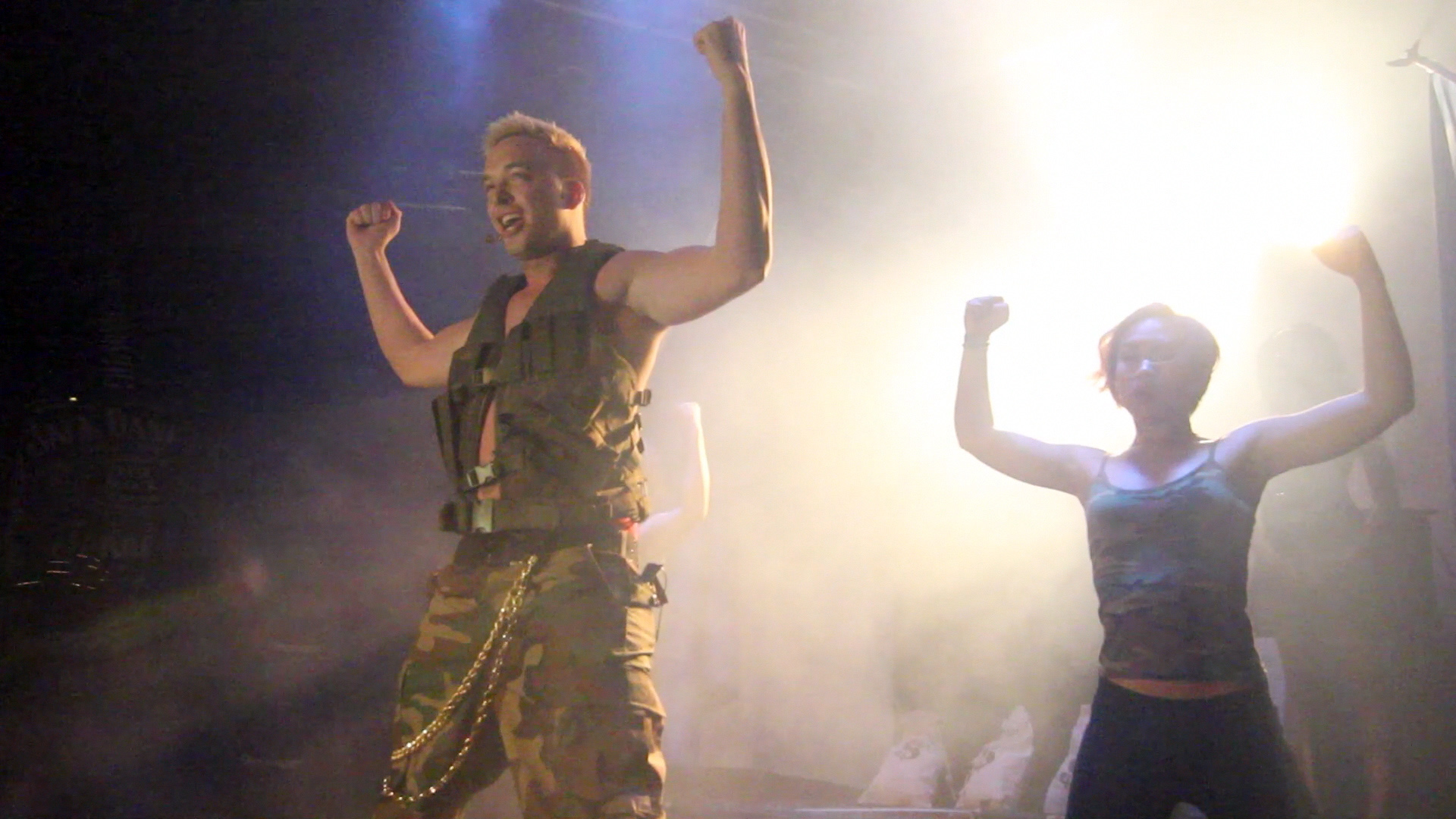
Kuba Ka performing on stage in 2013.

List of film performances as an actor
Title	Year	Role	Notes
Creating a Pop Sensation	2011	Himself	Lead Role
LA Live the Show	2013	Himself	Celebrity Guest
Live Nude Girls	2014	Krol	Supporting Role
Healthy Living	2014	Himself	Celebrity Guest

== Discography ==
=== EPs ===
List of EPs, with selected details
Title	Album details
Moonboy	Released: 9 February 2014; Format: Digital download; Label: KUBA Ka Empire Inc.
Combat	Released: 4 May 2014; Format: Digital download; Label: KUBA Ka Empire Inc.

=== Singles ===
Song	Year	Artist(s)	Label
"Combat"	2011	Kuba Ka	Interscope
"Streets of Freedom"	2011	Kuba Ka	Interscope
"Come To America"	2013	Kuba Ka & Flavor Flav	KUBA Ka Kingdom Inc.
"Roman Robotic"	2014	Kuba Ka	KUBA Ka Empire Inc.
"Stop Feenin’"	2014	Kuba Ka	KUBA Ka Empire Inc.
"In The Streets"	2014	Kuba Ka	KUBA Ka Empire Inc.
"Be With You"	2014	Kuba Ka	KUBA Ka Empire Inc.
"Moonboy"	2014	Kuba Ka	KUBA Ka Empire Inc.
"Physical Attraction"	2014	Kuba Ka	KUBA Ka Empire Inc.
"Here We Go"	2014	Kuba Ka	KUBA Ka Empire Inc.

=== Soundtrack appearances ===
Song	Year	Artist(s)	Movie / Television Series
"Stop Feenin’"	2014	Kuba Ka	Live Nude Girls
