= Monkenholt =

Coordinates: 51°39′37.84″N 0°11′51.26″W

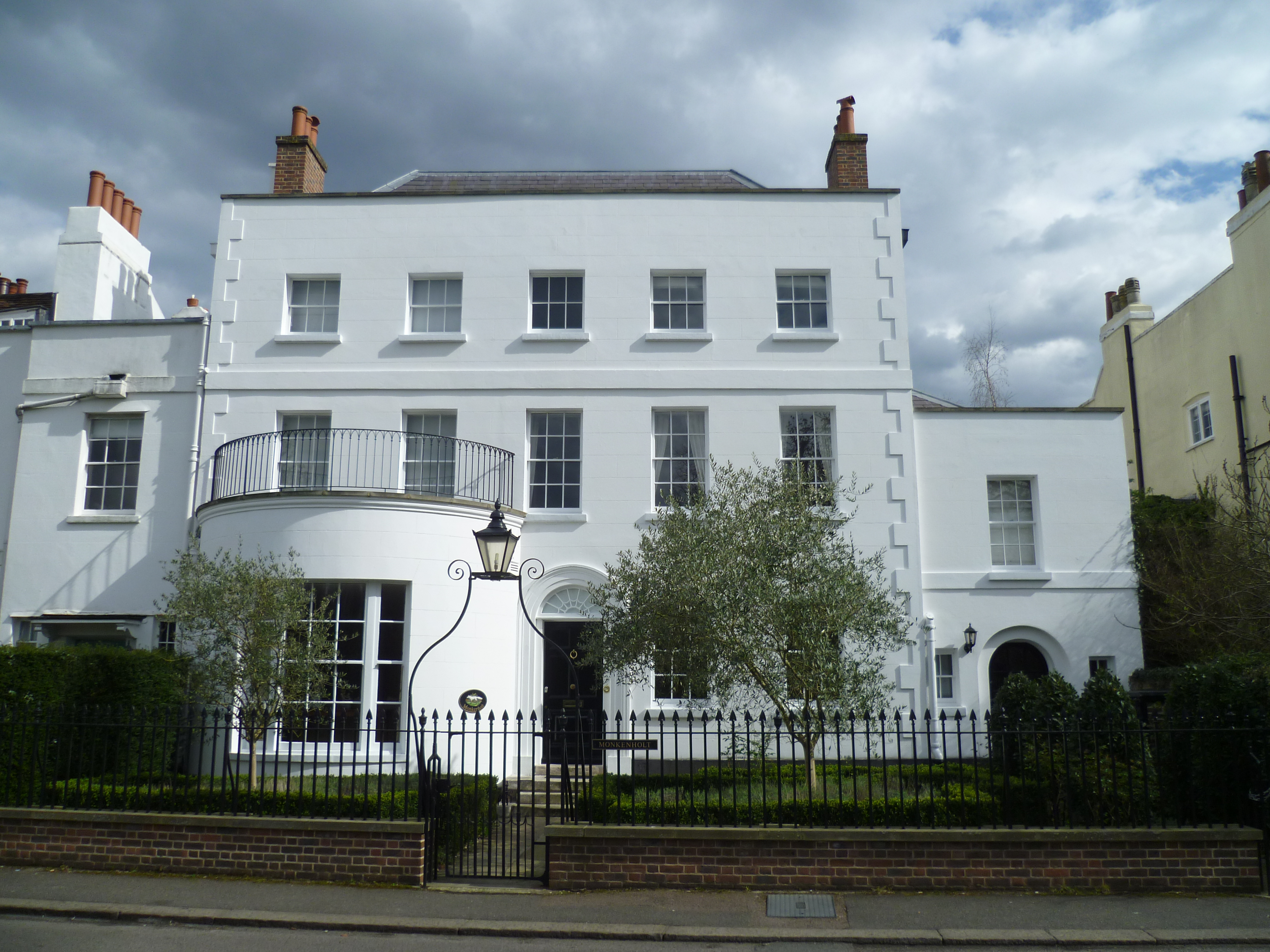
Monkenholt.

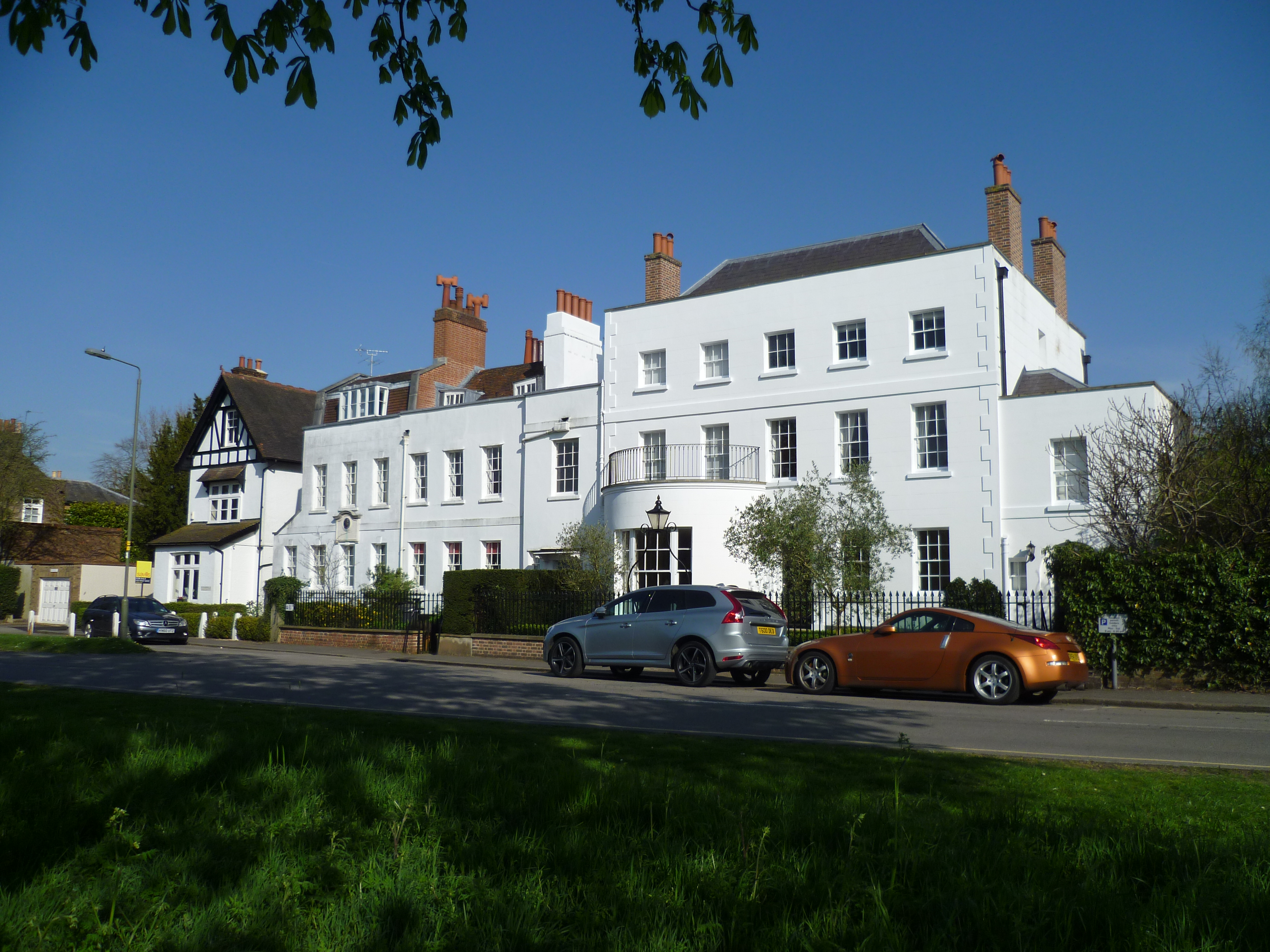
Monkenholt in Hadley Green Road.

Monkenholt is a late 18th century house in Hadley Green Road, Monken Hadley in the London Borough of Barnet. It is a grade II listed building.

The house was once the home of Dame Cicely Saunders, the founder of the hospice movement.

In 1971, the Angry Brigade exploded two bombs outside the house while it was the home of government minister Robert Carr. Carr and his family were unhurt but the house was badly damaged.
