= Hadley House, Hadley Green =

House in England

Coordinates: 51.6605°N 0.1975°W

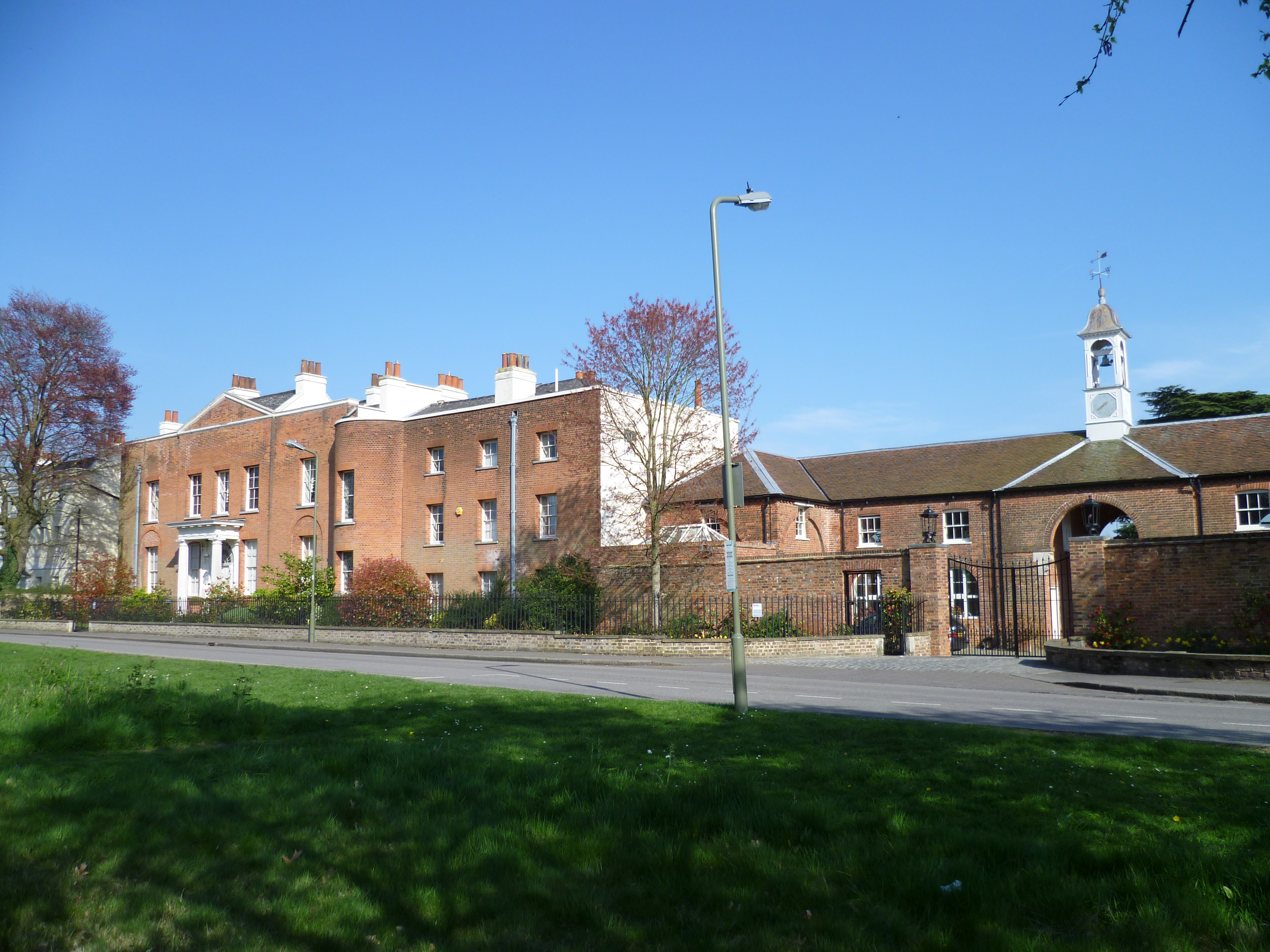
Hadley House and outbuildings

Hadley House is a grade II* listed building in the London Borough of Barnet, on Hadley Green Road facing Hadley Green. The house dates from 1760. The stable block and garden wall are also listed.

== Gallery ==
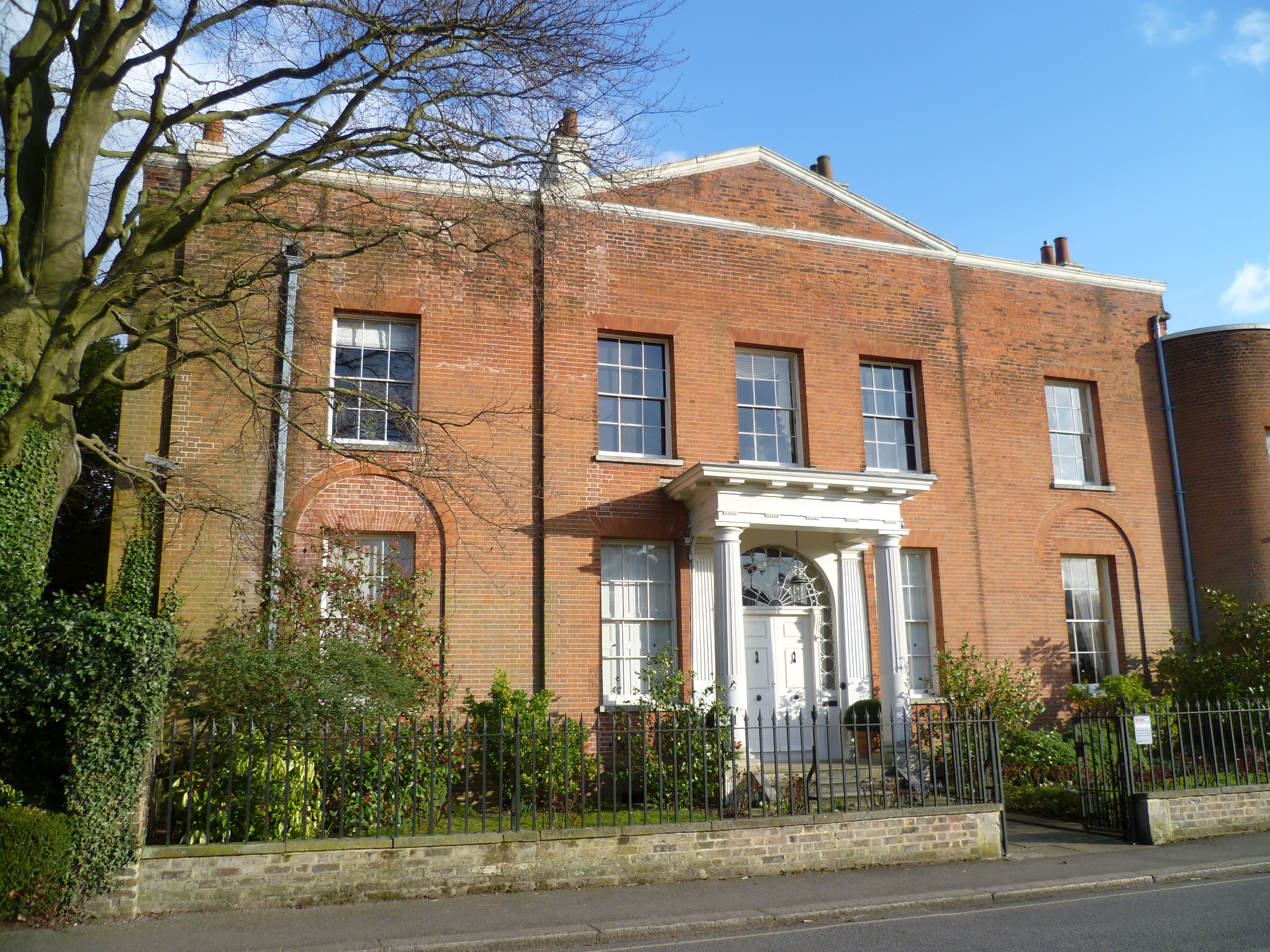
Hadley House

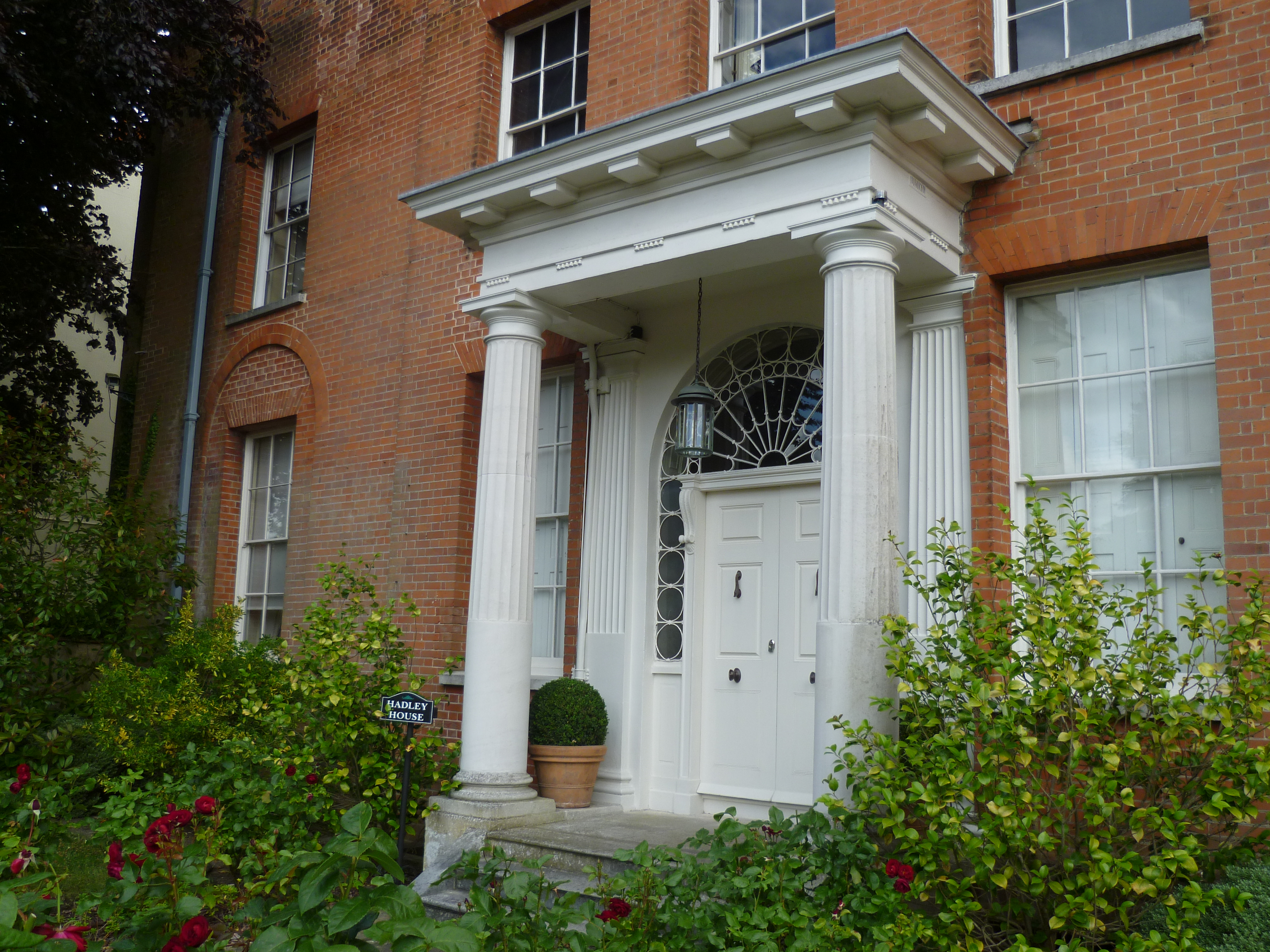
Main entrance

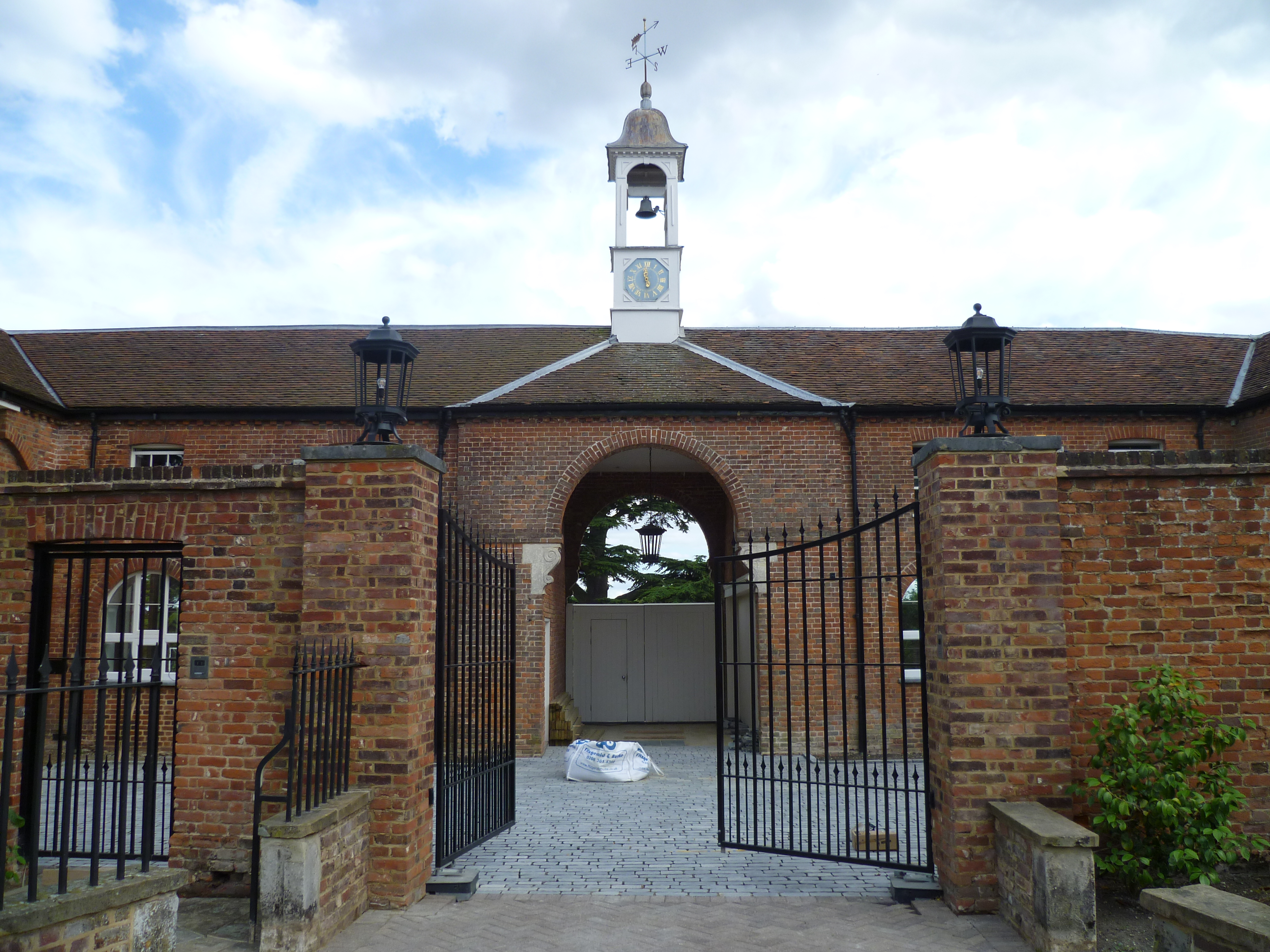
Outbuildings
