= Hawthorne Dene (house) =

Grade II* listed building in London, England

Coordinates: 51.6017°N 0.1720°W

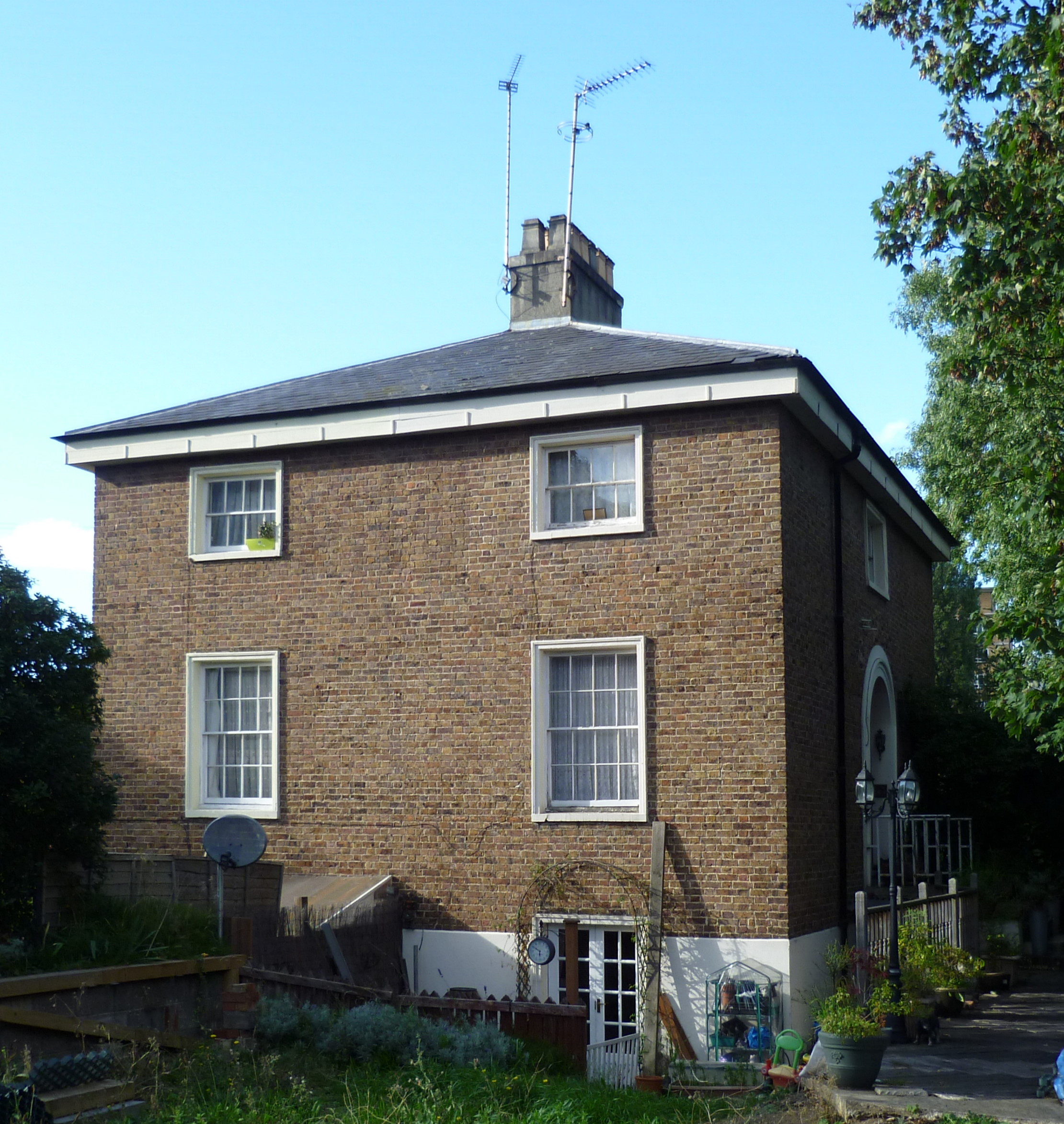
Hawthorne Dene

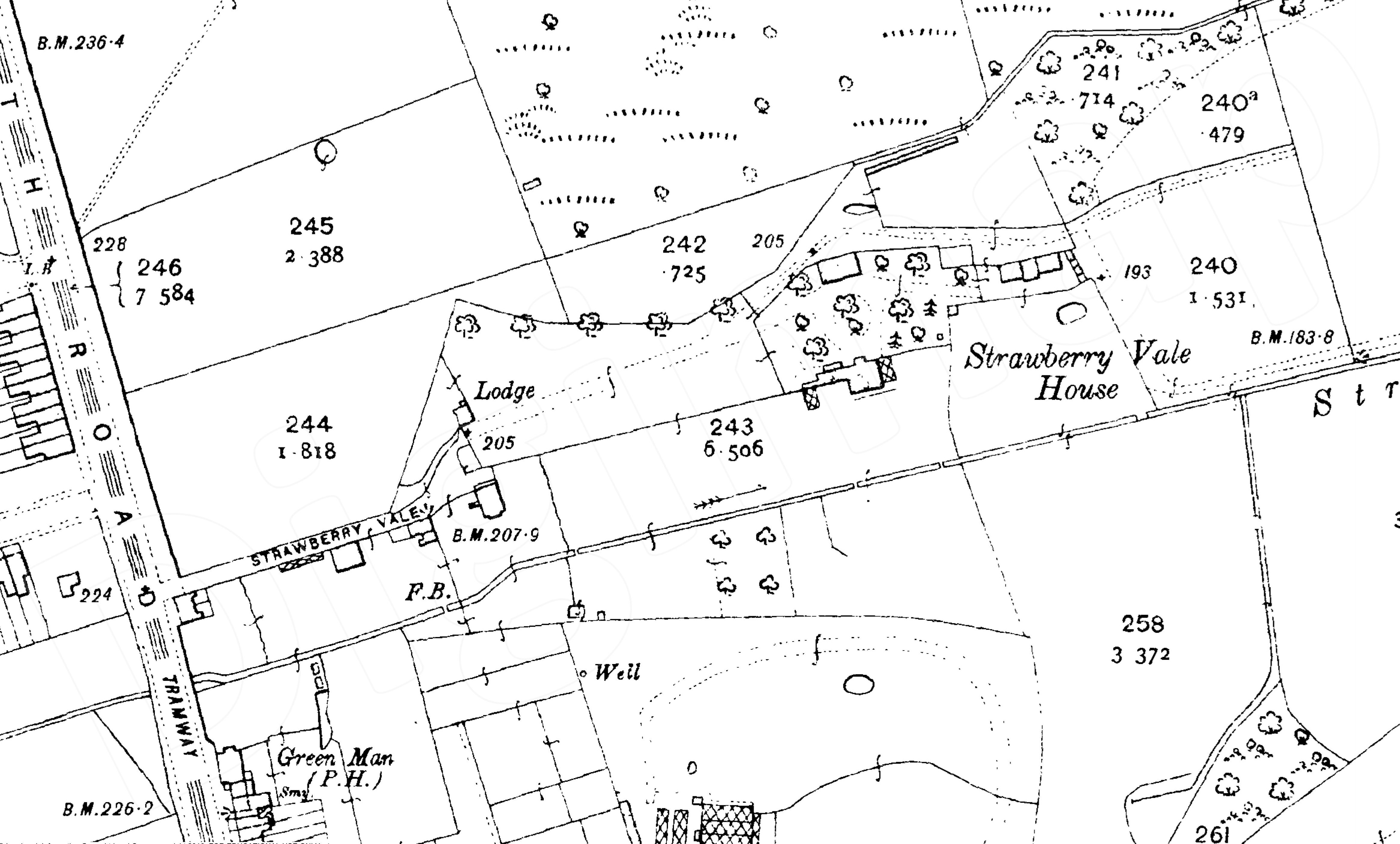
Ordnance Survey map from the 1910s showing Hawthorne Dene before the construction of the North Circular Road and the Strawberry Vale Estate. The house is immediately above the words "B.M.207.9".

Hawthorne Dene is a grade II* listed building in Strawberry Vale, East Finchley, in London. It borders the North Circular Road.

The house was built by James Frost in 1826 who acquired land in the area in 1818. It is known for its innovative construction methods which include concrete and cast iron ceilings and banisters. It was listed in 1962 following a campaign by the comedian Spike Milligan.
