= Mount House, Monken Hadley =

Grade II* listed house in London, England

Coordinates: 51.6631°N 0.1892°W

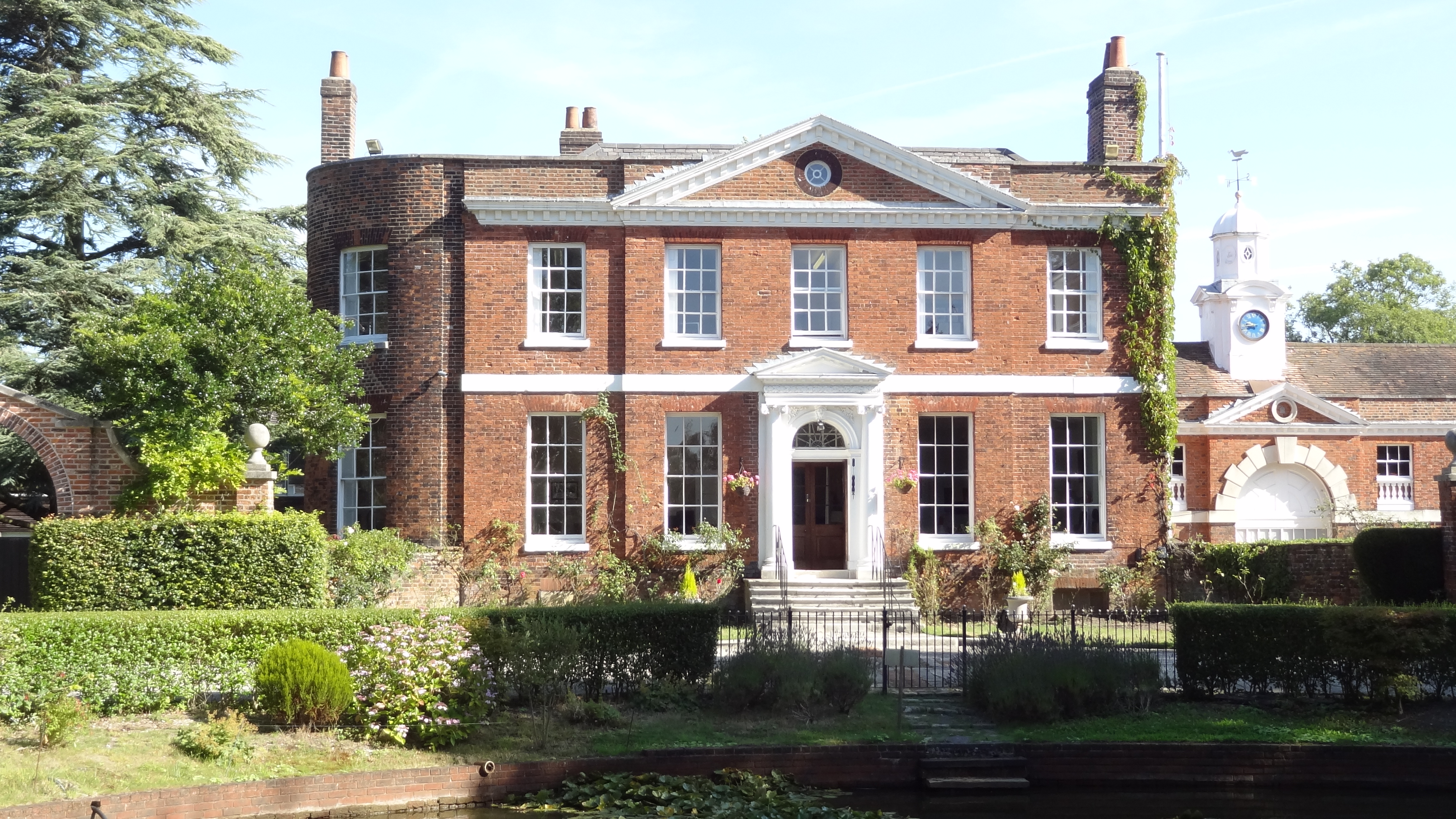
Mount House and the attached stable block.

Mount House, Camlet Way, Monken Hadley, in the London Borough of Barnet, is a grade II* listed house. The attached stable block is also listed.

== History ==
The house dates from the mid eighteenth century and is home to Mount House School, formerly St Martha's Senior School for girls (1947-2017).

The house was the home between 1836 and 1863 of Joseph Henry Green, one of the most eminent surgeons in England and literary executor of Samuel Taylor Coleridge and the editor of Spiritual Philosophy; founded on the teachings of the late Samuel Taylor Coleridge (1866) which was written at Mount House. The house was also the home of the Architectural Association School between 1941 and 1945.
