= New Southgate =

Area in London, England

Coordinates: 51.6136°N 0.1419°W

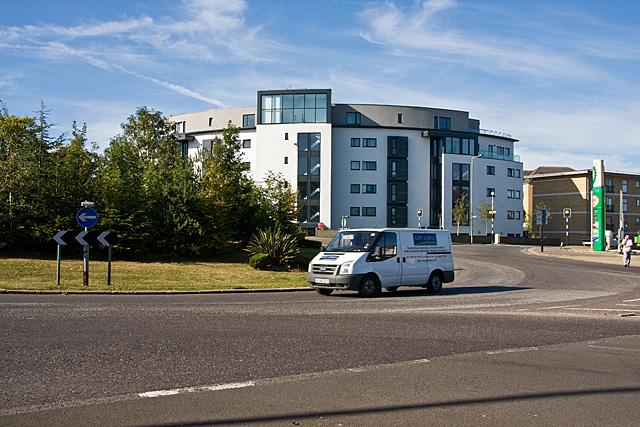
- Betstyle Circus

- Location within Greater London
- OS grid reference: TQ286922
- London borough: Barnet; Enfield; Haringey
- Ceremonial county: Greater London
- Region: London
- Country: England
- Sovereign state: United Kingdom
- Post town: LONDON
- Postcode district: N11
- Dialling code: 020
- Police: Metropolitan
- Fire: London
- Ambulance: London
- UK Parliament: Chipping Barnet; Southgate and Wood Green
- London Assembly: Barnet and Camden; Enfield and Haringey; Enfield and Haringey

New Southgate is a residential suburb straddling three Outer London Boroughs: a small part of the east of Barnet, a south-west corner of Enfield and in loosest definitions, based on nearest railway stations, a small northern corner of Haringey in North London, England, where estates merge into Bounds Green.

Its first church, founded in 1873, was among organisations opting for the newer name, New Southgate, rather than the older hamlet name Colney Hatch, which from 1851 became more use-specific. The gradual demise of the former place name use is shown by New Southgate railway station, renamed five times. Changes in this terminology reflect social stigma attached to a large residential institution, in this case the Colney Hatch Lunatic Asylum, built in 1851, which co-provided for Middlesex, and as such continued to serve much of London after London County Council was founded in 1889. The later mental health hospital closed in 1993 and has been redeveloped into two housing estates, Princess Park Manor and Friern Village in New Southgate.

== Overview ==
The low-rise residential area with some mid-rise pockets and many small parks, recreation grounds, schools and playgrounds is characterised by housing estates with rear gardens, resulting in its relatively low population density. The district traverses three boroughs: Barnet, Enfield and Haringey. Much is a sub area of Southgate and part of an electoral ward which has usually included 'Southgate' in successive names, including Southgate Grove, and the current Southgate Green.

Postal system

The postcode area N11 takes in New Southgate. It skirts significantly into Arnos Grove, Bounds Green and Friern Barnet. It is numbered eleventh (N11) due to its main post distribution centre being in New Southgate and the numbering on that basis was alphabetical (aside from N1).

== History ==
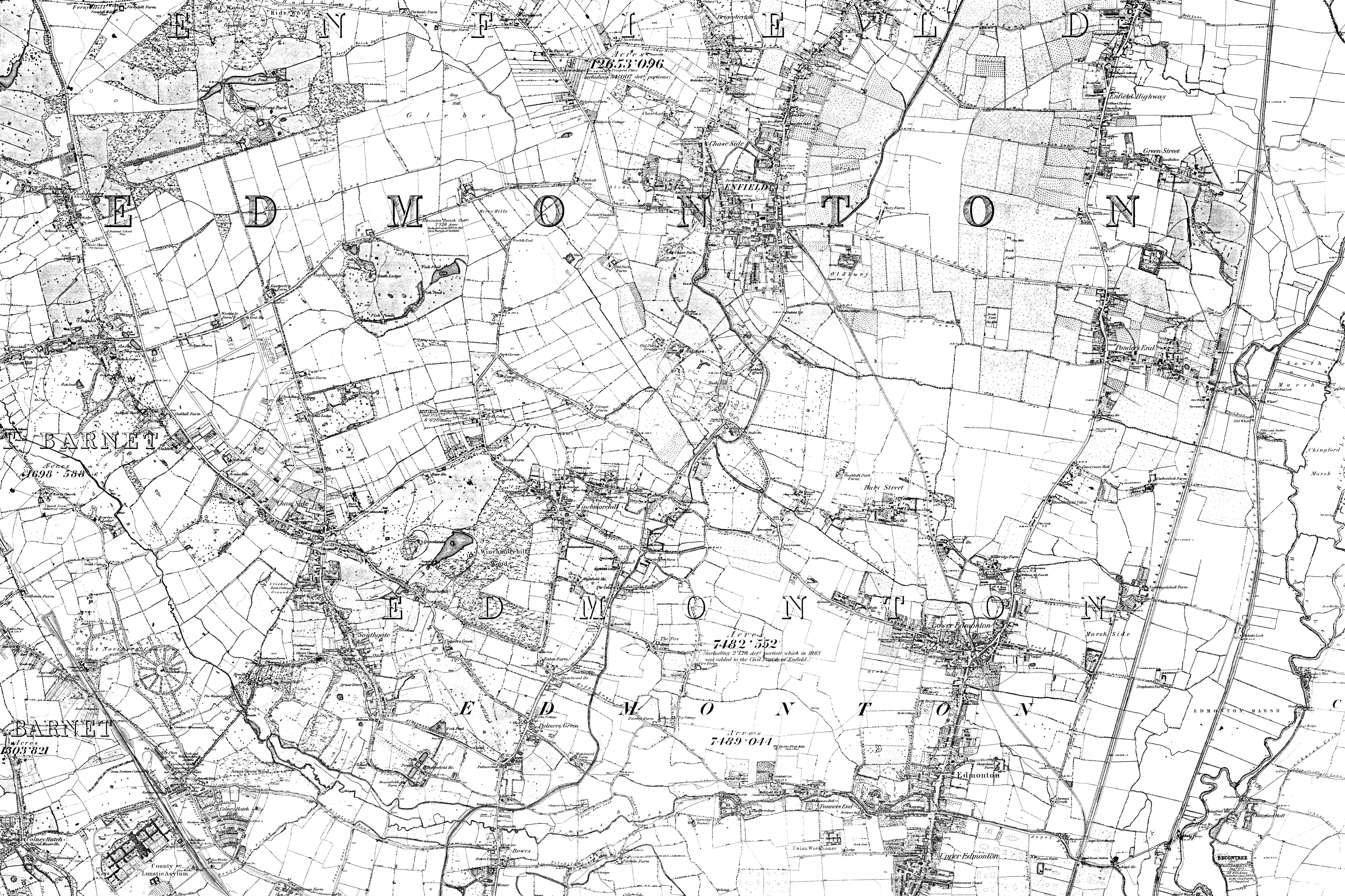
Extract from Map of Middlesex, Ordnance Survey, 1868-1883

The first reference to New Southgate is in the 1850s. Much of New Southgate was once the hamlet of Betstile centred on a crossroads at which stood Betstile House and Betstile Lodge; Betstyle has been perpetuated since the early 20th century with Betstyle Road and Betstyle Circus.

North and east parts were known as Betstyle and as a natural progression fell into the Municipal Borough of Southgate (1881-1965); Southgate had recently grown from a broad hamlet of South Street and others in the parish of Edmonton. From 1851 Southgate constituted a district chapelry under Edmonton which replaced the semi-private Ward Chapel at Arnos Grove built in the 17th century — immediately north-east of Betstyle. The parent chapelry was upgraded with a church in 1862 and installed with stained glass windows in 1865 by D.G. Rossetti by which date it had many isolated streets of housing to serve such as around the crossroads at Betstyle (also written as Betstile).

West parts from 1409 until the 20th century were frequently referred to in title deeds as Colney Hatch. Development was tightly constrained. It was estimated the hamlet had 12 of 78 taxable houses in the narrow parish in 1795; but 33 inhabited houses in Colney Hatch are recorded in 1801. This co-parent parish extended a total of 3 miles (4.8 km) west, Friern Barnet. Maps show the name Colney Hatch, interchangeably with New Southgate, coming to cover the more developed hamlet Betstyle, in the chapelry of Southgate within the parish of Edmonton; the refined hamlet and grand asylum outweighed the initial stigma in official maps and deeds, but less so in social organisations and in the naming of the railway station, the line of which resembles the historic split between the two parishes and later districts including today's boroughs. The crossroads of Colney Hatch had Halliwick manor house standing north of some cottages on the south-west corner; The White House and The Orange Tree Inn on the north-west side near to Brook House; The Priory, north-east with Woodlands, Greenbank, and Springfield to the north to which were added the Hermitage and several cottages on the south-west corner by 1783. It saw very little change in the 19th century before the construction of the county lunatic asylum: in 1882 Colney Hatch was described "as a village which had sprung up to serve the staff".

However Colney Hatch was from 1851 slowly erased from the names of schools, churches and most other organisations as residents sought to distance themselves from a lingering social stigma from passers-by and social gossip across the county of the large mental health institution. The vast site operated for many decades, first under an enforced mass segregation regime, which was later abolished nationwide, to treat the mentally unwell: Colney Hatch Lunatic Asylum.

All 19th century urban development was concentrated in the east on what had been Betstyle, 1 mile (1.6 km) from the rural centre of the ancient, that is to say medieval-founded, elongated parish of Friern Barnet to the northwest. The name Colney Hatch Park was used by some developers for this area; however, the new name New Southgate was increasingly adopted.

Parishes had taken over from manorial courts by devolution to their vestries chiefly in the 17th century. Southgate, extending to the north and east, became a local board in 1881, and later an urban district and municipal borough. Friern Barnet civil parish, extending in the other directions, became Friern Barnet Urban District which existed between 1883 and 1965.

St Paul's Church, New Southgate was consecrated in 1873, taking part of its parish from Christ Church, Southgate and part from St James the Great, Friern Barnet, the latter transferring land east of the Great Northern Railway. The extant ecclesiastical parish boundary likewise traverses the boroughs of Enfield and Barnet while additionally a small portion is within the London Borough of Haringey, Bounds Green Ward.

=== Friern Hospital ===
Many tens of acres were bought and used by the second county lunatic asylum for Middlesex, as maps of before World War II show. The later mental health hospital on the site closed in 1993. It was redeveloped into two housing estates, Princess Park Manor and Friern Village in New Southgate.

=== Churches ===
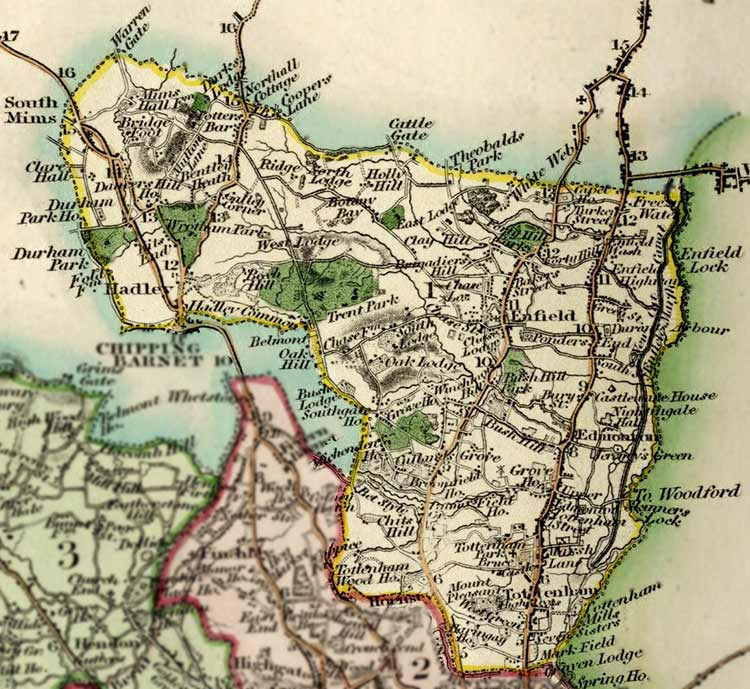
Extract from a map of 1820

The Anglican church in New Southgate is the first locally. It originated in 1870 in a mission to the new district of Colney Hatch by the assistant curate of the church built seven years previously in Southgate. In 1873 it became a consolidated chapelry in parts of Southgate and Friern Barnet parishes, with the vicar of Southgate as patron. Attendance on census Sunday 1903 was 206 in the morning and 265 in the evening. Services were held in a temporary building in Ely Place until a church was built on land between Betstyle Road (later High Road) and Woodland Road probably given by G. Knights-Smith, one of the largest subscribers. The foundation stone was laid in 1872 and the church, built of stone in the Early English style under the direction of George Gilbert Scott, was consecrated in 1873. It consists of chancel with north and south chapels and south bell turret and aisled nave. The fabric, severely damaged by bombing in 1944, was restored by R. S. Morris by 1957. A stone vicarage, built in Woodland Road opposite the church in 1878–80, was demolished in 1964. A parish hall was built to the north of the church in 1908.

In 1910 the more stridently Protestant, Baptist United Reform church, Christ Church New Southgate & Friern Barnet was built.

The Catholic Church, Our Lady of Lourdes dates to the mid 20th century.

== Notable residents ==
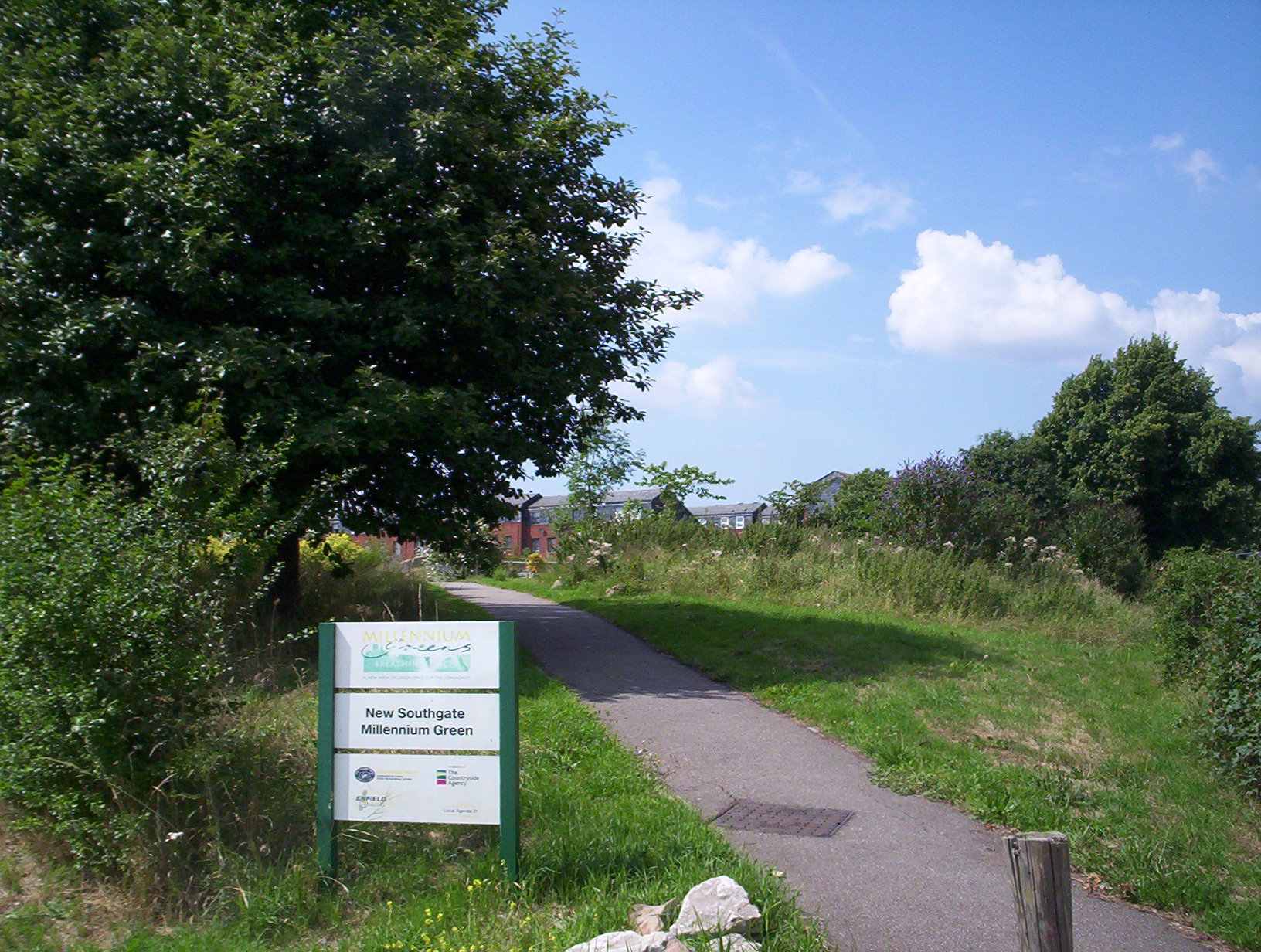
The Entrance to New Southgate Millennium Green, London

New Southgate was home to Jerome K Jerome, writer of Three Men in a Boat, who lived on Springfield Road. He is commemorated with a statue of a boat and a mosaic of a dog on the New Southgate Millennium Green on Station Road.

Gerald Massey, poet and Chartist, lived on Grove Road, New Southgate, and gives his name to the adjoining Massey Close.

== Politics ==
The area is part of the New Southgate ward for elections to Enfield London Borough Council.

== Transport ==
=== Rail and bus ===
New Southgate railway station is situated on Station Road, on the border with neighbouring Friern Barnet. The station is served by Great Northern and Thameslink trains, which link the area to destinations in Hertfordshire to the north, including Potter's Bar and Welwyn Garden City. Southbound services travel towards King's Cross or Moorgate (in the City) via Finsbury Park. The station was built in 1851 and its name has changed several times over the years, often sharing its name with Colney Hatch and Friern Barnet.

Arnos Grove is the closest tube station, on the Piccadilly line. This line too runs southbound towards Finsbury Park and King's Cross, although trains continue towards the West End and West London, and Heathrow Airport.

London Buses routes 34, 184, 221, 232, 251, 298, 382 and SL1 pass through the area. Bus 34 runs overnight on Friday and Saturday nights between Barnet and Walthamstow Central. Night bus N91 runs between Cockfosters and Trafalgar Square nightly.

A spur of Crossrail 2 is planned to terminate at New Southgate, if the project goes ahead.

=== Road ===
The A406 North Circular Road runs along the southern edge of New Southgate. The road links the area directly to the M1, M11, and M4 roads, and to major areas elsewhere in London such as Chiswick, Wembley, and Ilford. According to Inrix, the A406 between East Finchley and Edmonton (which passes through New Southgate), is the sixth most congested stretch of road in the UK. Inrix estimated in 2019 that 43 hours are 'lost' in traffic jams in the area each year.

Other main routes include the A109 (south-north from Wood Green to Whetstone), the A1003 (westbound to Friern Barnet and North Finchley), and the A1110 (eastbound to the North Circular Road).

=== Walking and cycling ===
A two-way cycle track runs adjacent to the eastbound carriageway of the North Circular Road. The cycleway is segregated from traffic and carries cyclists westbound towards Henley's Corner (near Golders Green).

A shared-use path for cyclists and pedestrians runs northbound from New Southgate to East Barnet through Brunswick Park. The route is named the Waterfall Walk and is part of the Pymmes Brook Trail. For cyclists, it is signposted northbound towards East Barnet. A similar path runs south through Arnos Park, again following the course of the Pymmes Brook.
