= Brunswick Park =

Area in London, England

Coordinates: 51.626°N 0.148°W

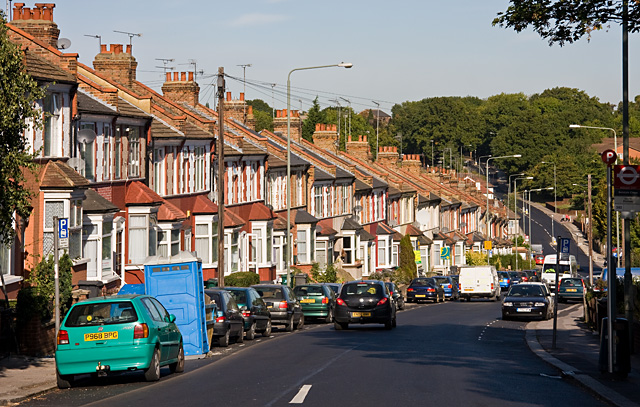
- Brunswick Park Road

- Location within Greater London
- Population: 16,394 (2011 Census. Ward)
- OS grid reference: TQ2893
- London borough: Barnet
- Ceremonial county: Greater London
- Region: London
- Country: England
- Sovereign state: United Kingdom
- Post town: LONDON
- Postcode district: N11
- Dialling code: 020
- Police: Metropolitan
- Fire: London
- Ambulance: London
- UK Parliament: Chipping Barnet
- London Assembly: Barnet and Camden

Brunswick Park is a neighbourhood and public park in the London Borough of Barnet. It is north of New Southgate and to the south of Oakleigh Park. Roads include Brunswick Park Road, Brunswick Avenue and Brunswick Crescent.

== Amenities ==
Its eponymous park consists of a playground and sports fields. Area amenities include Brunswick Park Primary and Nursery School, Brunswick Park Medical Practice, St Andrew the Apostle Greek Orthodox School, and Osidge library. New Southgate Cemetery, North London Business Park, Brunswick Industrial Park and New Southgate Recreation Ground all front Brunswick Park Road.

== History ==
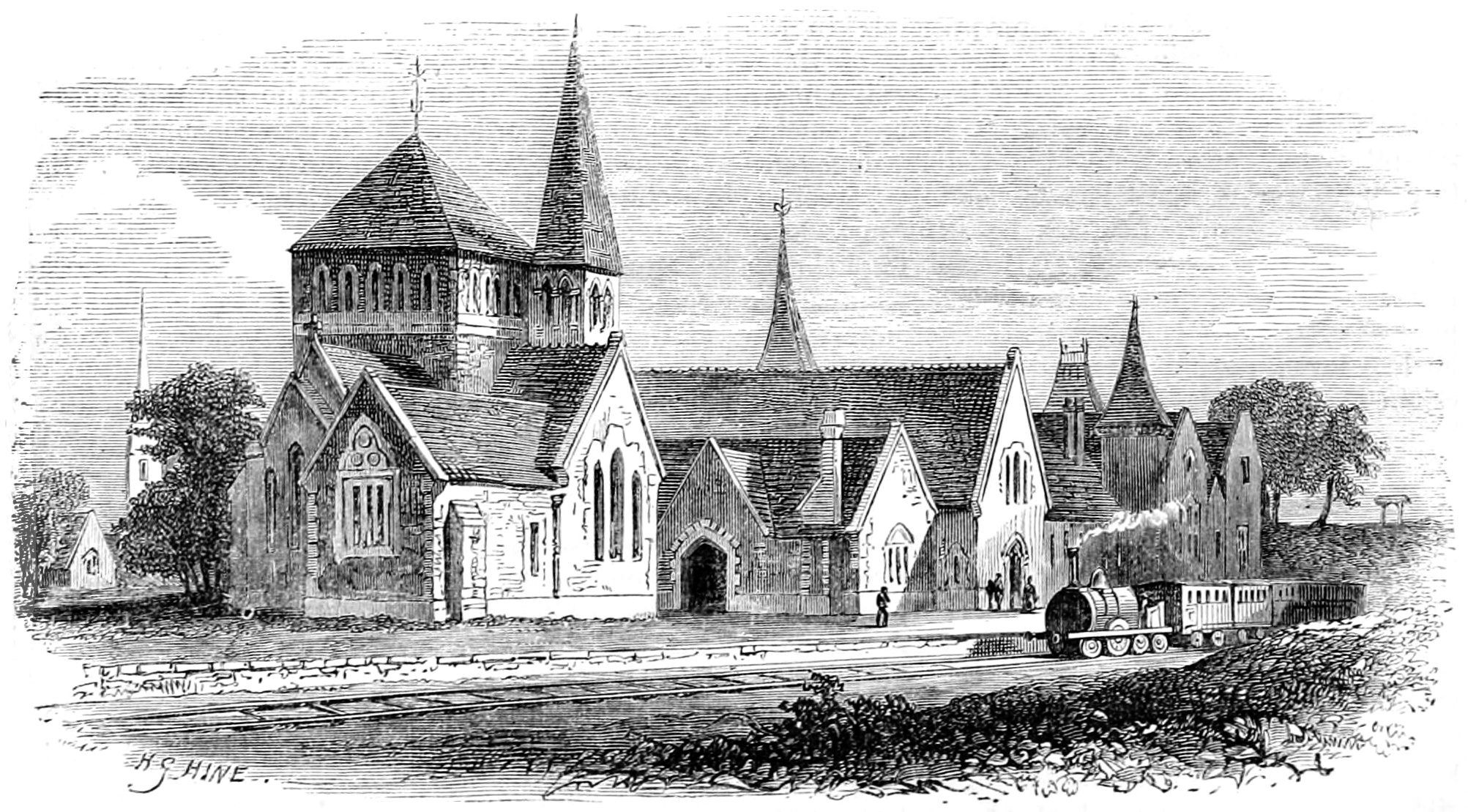
The cemetery station, 1861

In the 1860s, East Barnet Lane (now Brunswick Park Road) was the location of a Great Northern Railway station and adjoining chapel serving the Great Northern Cemetery (opened 1861), linked by a single track to Southgate & Colney Hatch (now New Southgate) station. The service was discontinued in the 1870s and the station later demolished some time after 1912.

A large factory, built for Standard Telephones and Cables (STC), opened in 1922 on and north of the former site of the station. The factory became a major local landmark and for many years was referred to by its workers and the local population as 'The Standard'. During World War II a German bomb fell on the factory, killing 33 people. The site was later developed as the North London Business Park.

Brunswick Park had parish status between 1896 and 1972. St Michael's church was built in 1902 and demolished in 1973 after which the site was developed for housing. On the opposite side of Brunswick Park Road, another housing development has taken part of the original cemetery grounds, in the vicinity of the original main entrance.

Previously within the East Barnet Urban District, Hertfordshire, the district transferred to the London Borough of Barnet in 1965 and the borders of Brunswick Park electoral ward later expanded to include Osidge, previously its own ward.

== Politics and government ==
Brunswick Park is covered by the Chipping Barnet constituency for elections to the House of Commons of the United Kingdom.

Brunswick Park is covered by the Brunswick Park ward for elections to Barnet London Borough Council.

== Transport ==
=== Nearest stations ===
- Oakleigh Park railway station
- New Southgate railway station
- Arnos Grove Underground station
