= St Paul's Church, New Southgate =

Coordinates: 51.61541°N 0.14144°W

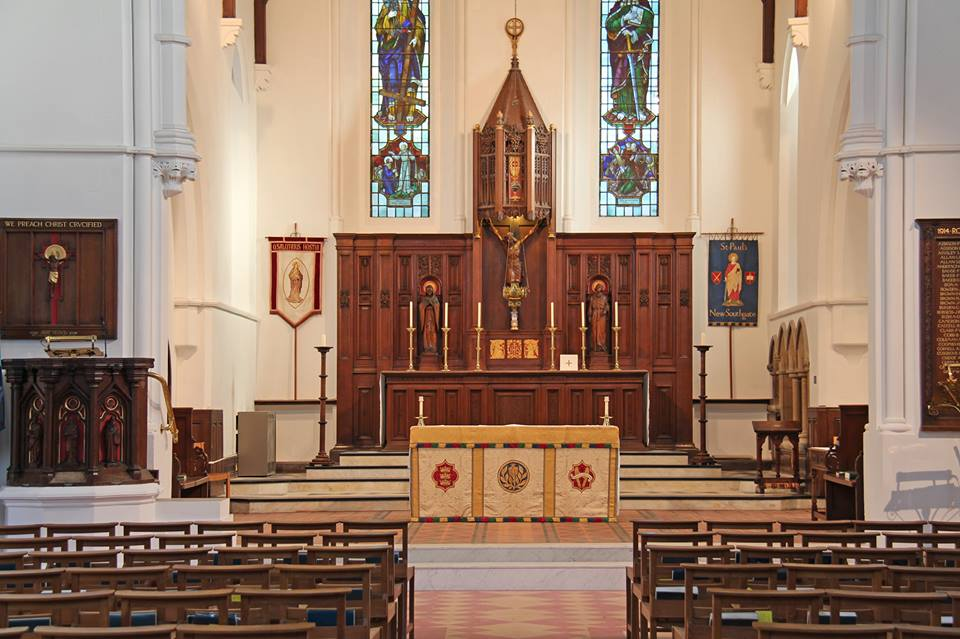
- Interior of St Paul's Church following restoration of the sanctuary in 2014
- St Paul's Church, New Southgate
- Location: Woodland Road, New Southgate, London, N11 1PN
- Country: England
- Denomination: Church of England

History
- Status: Active

Architecture
- Functional status: Parish church
- Architect: Sir George Gilbert Scott

Administration
- Diocese: Diocese of London
- Archdeaconry: Archdeaconry of Hampstead
- Deanery: Central Barnet
- Parish: St. Paul, New Southgate

Clergy
- Bishop(s): The Rt Rev'd and Right Hon Sarah Mullally DBE, The Rt Rev'd Rob Wickham (Area Bishop)
- Priest: Rev Matt Harbage

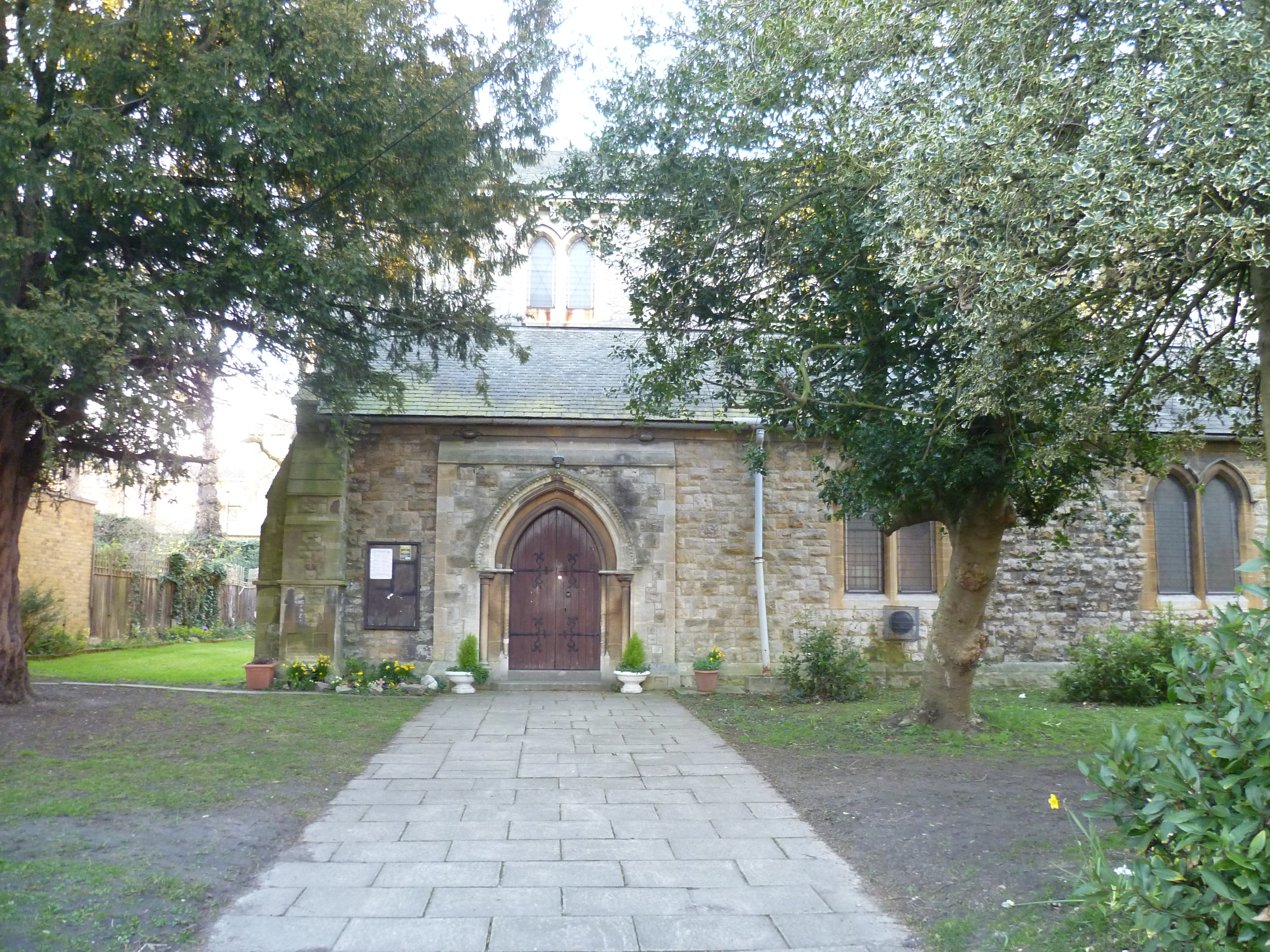
Entrance

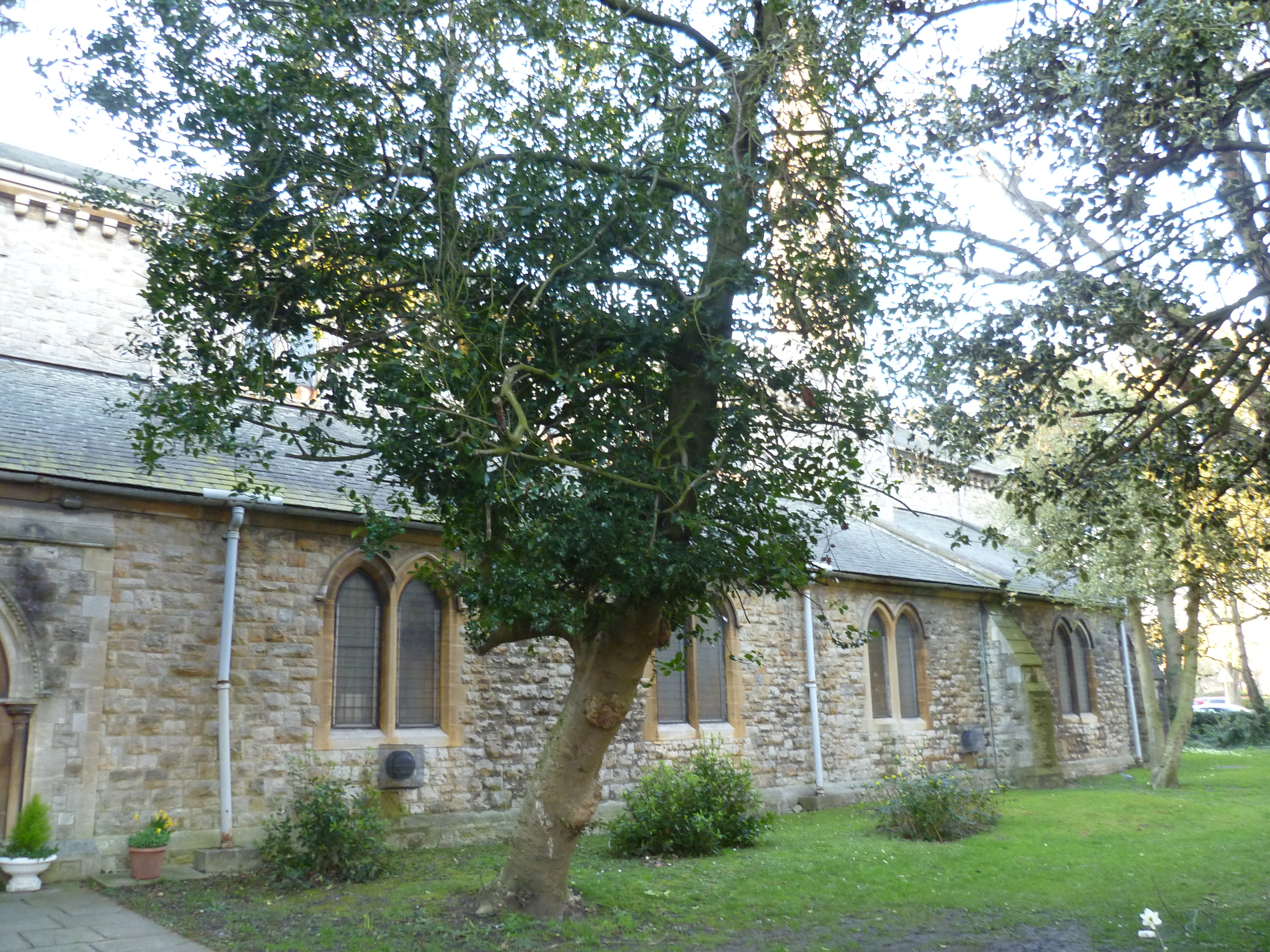
South side

The Parish Church of Saint Paul is a Church of England parish church in New Southgate, London Borough of Enfield, London. St Paul's is an inclusive, welcoming church with an all-age community. Service details are available on the church's website: https://stpaulsnewsouthgate.co.uk/. Baptisms, Weddings and Funerals are regularly taken at St Paul's.

== History ==
The church originated in 1870 as a mission to the new district of Colney Hatch by the assistant curate of Christ Church, Southgate. The church was built in 1873. In 1873 it became a consolidated chapelry, formed from Southgate and Friern Barnet parishes, with the vicar of Southgate as Patron of the new living. Attendance on census Sunday 1903 was 206 in the morning and 265 in the evening.

St Paul's Parish Church has, for much of its history, embraced a Churchmanship that tries to reach out to worshippers wherever they are in the liturgical tradition. This has included a more Anglo-Catholic approach which began with the introduction of High Mass in 1914. Services were held in a temporary building in Ely Place until a church was built on land between Betstyle Road (later High Road) and Woodland Road probably given by G. Knights Smith, one of the largest subscribers.

The foundation stone was laid in 1872 and the church, built of stone in the Early English style under the direction of Sir George Gilbert Scott, was consecrated in 1873. It consists of chancel with north and south chapels and south bell turret and aisled nave. The fabric, which was severely damaged by bombing in 1944, was restored by R. S. Morris by 1957.

A stone vicarage, built in Woodland Road opposite the church in 1878–80, was demolished in 1964, and was replaced by a purpose-built vicarage on land in the churchyard, to the west of the church.

A parish hall was built to the north of the church in 1908, and partially rebuilt in 1952.
