= Friern Hospital =

Psychiatric hospital in London, 1849–1993

- North East Thames Health Authority
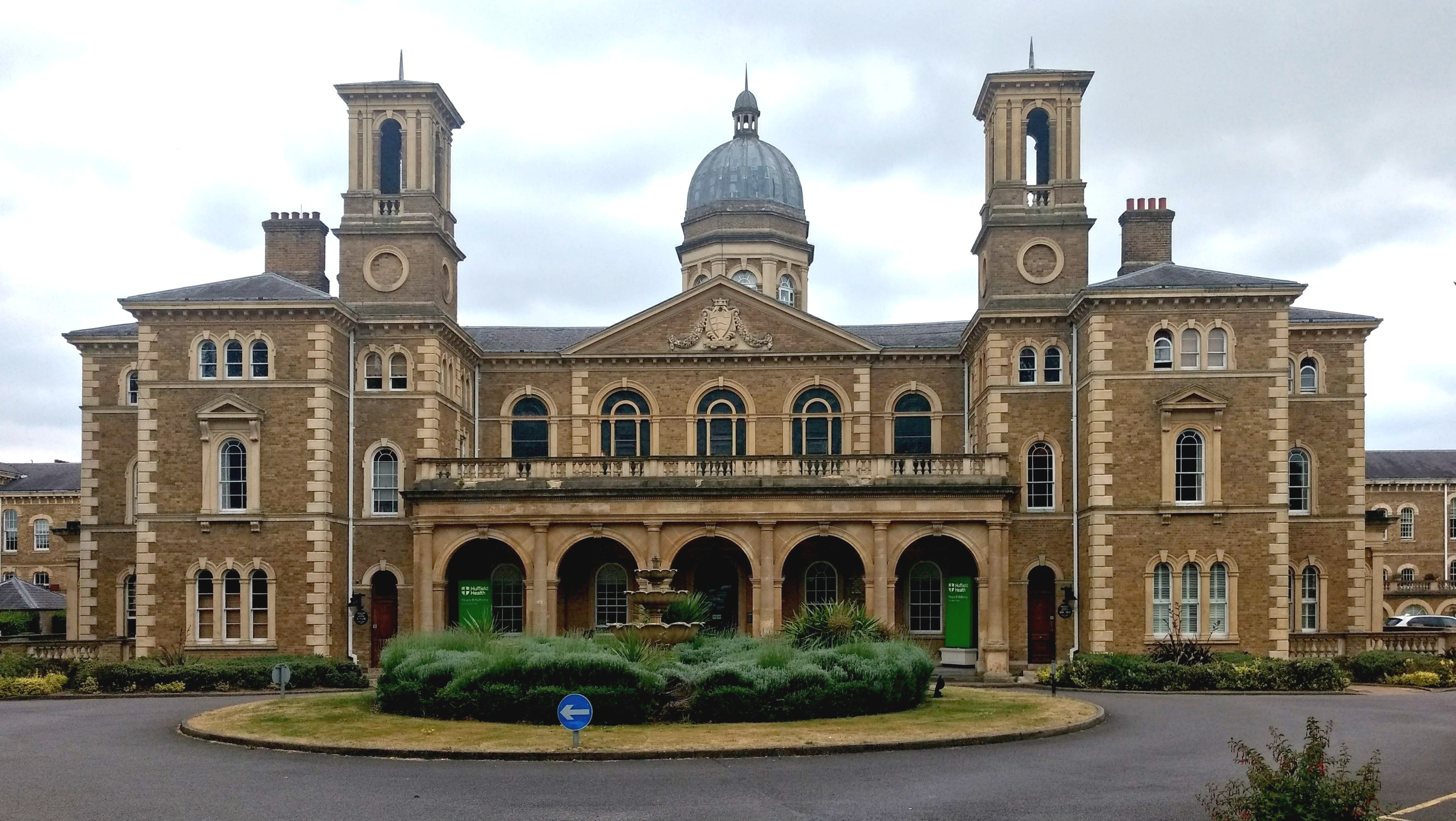
- Main building seen in 2017

- Location within Barnet

Geography
- Location: Friern Barnet, London, England, United Kingdom
- Coordinates: 51.61402°N 0.14839°W

Organisation
- Care system: NHS England
- Type: Mental health

Services
- Emergency department: No Accident & Emergency

History
- Founded: 1849
- Closed: 1993

Links
- Lists: Hospitals in England

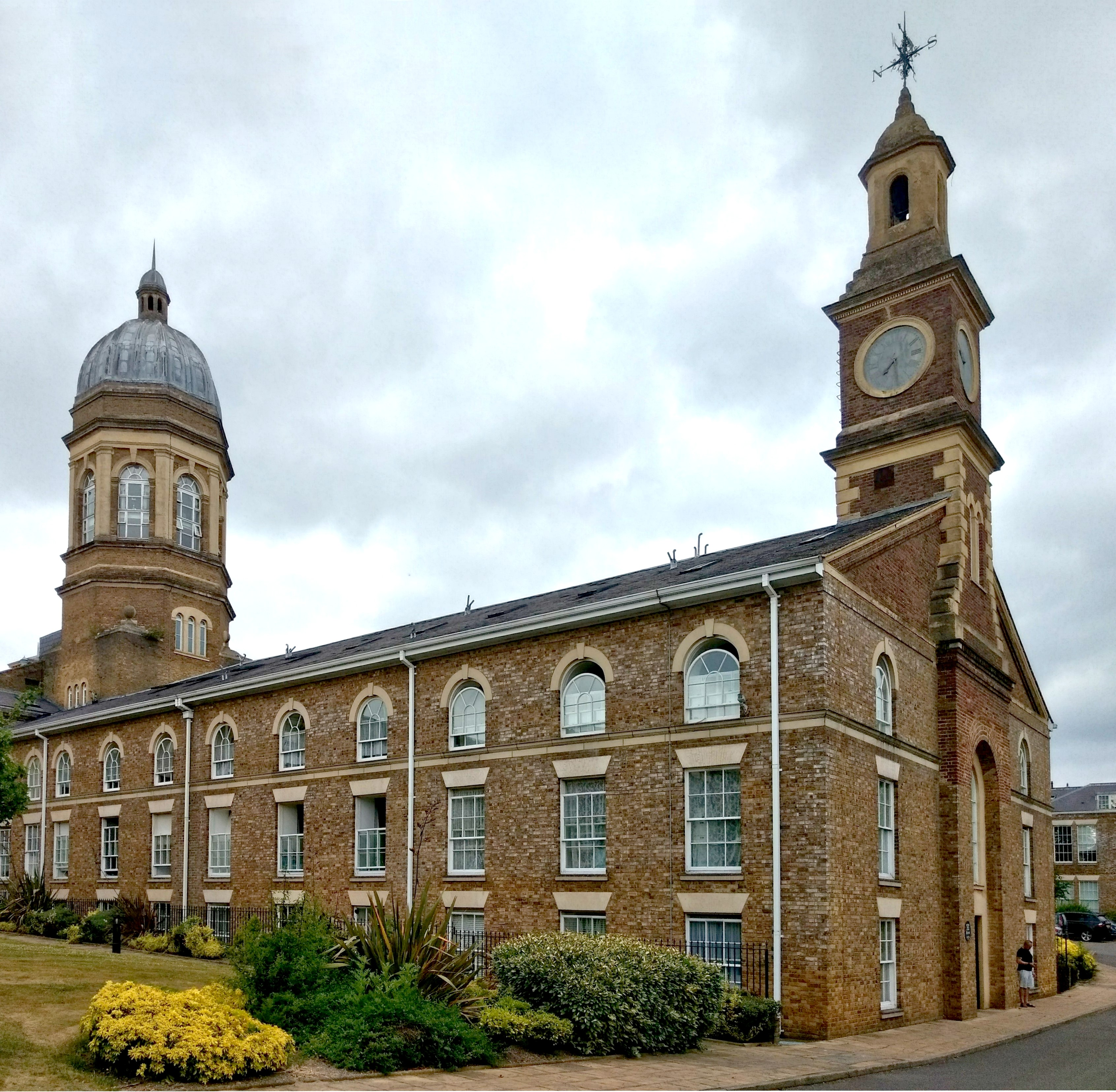
Clock tower at rear

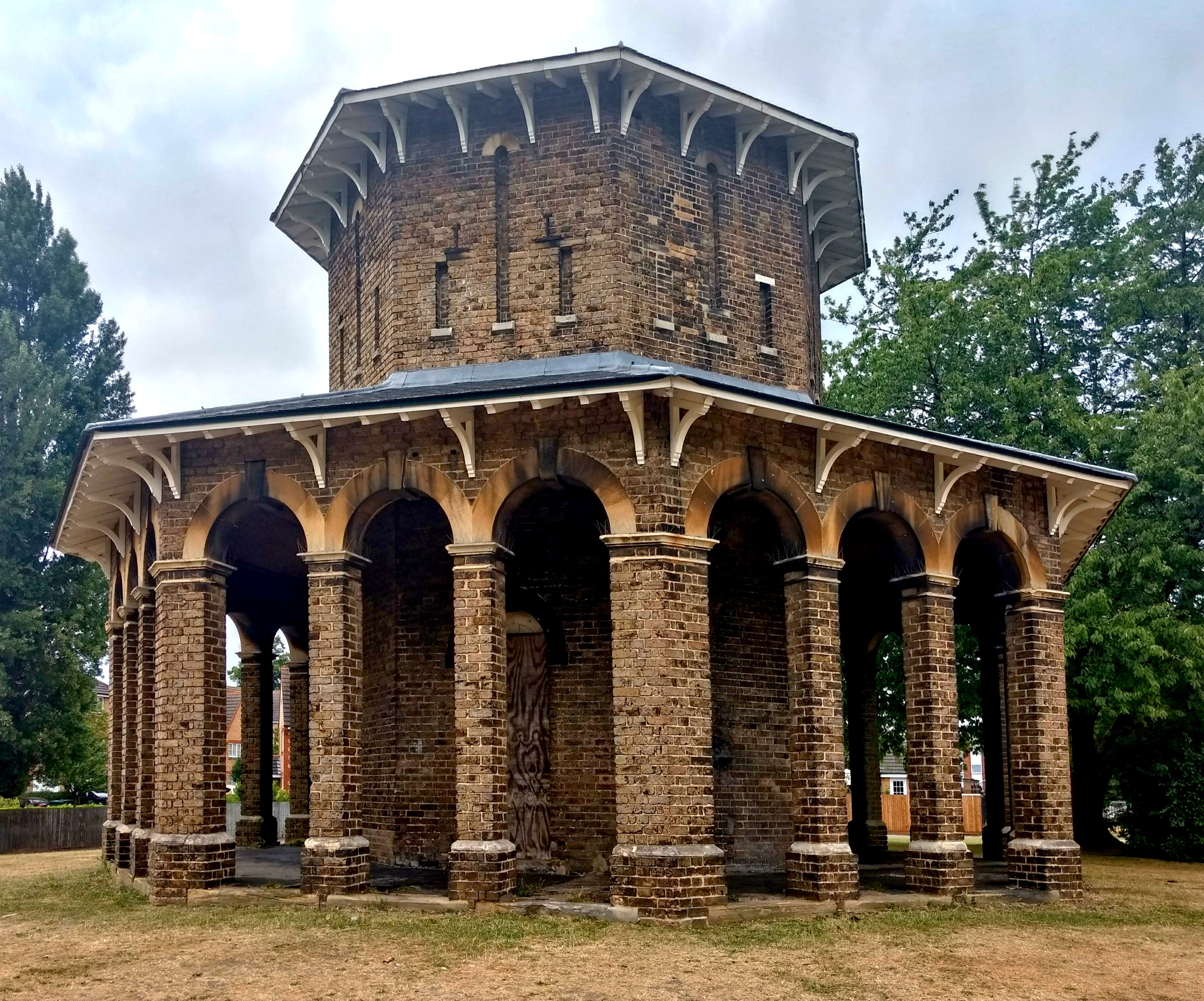
Water tank

Friern Hospital (formerly Colney Hatch Lunatic Asylum) was a psychiatric hospital in the parish of Friern Barnet close to a crossroads which had a hamlet known as Colney Hatch. In 1965, it became part of the London Borough of Barnet and in the early 21st century was converted to residential housing as Princess Park Manor and Friern Village. The hospital was built as the Second Middlesex County Asylum and was in operation from 1851 to 1993. After the County of London was created in 1889 it continued to serve much of Middlesex and of the newer county, London. During much of this time its smaller prototype Hanwell Asylum also operated.

At its height, Colney Hatch was home to 2,500 mental patients and had the longest corridor in Britain (It would take a visitor more than two hours to walk the wards). For much of the 20th century, its name was synonymous among Londoners with any mental institution.

The asylum with its surrounding fields, gardens and recreation grounds adjoined Friern Barnet Road and is shown on the Ordnance Survey map of 1868–1883, which labels the nascent settlement of New Southgate under a popular developers' name Colney Hatch Park. Today that larger community is the core area of New Southgate in the London Borough of Enfield. The map shows the large asylum which resembled closely the new settlement in size. Friern Barnet is today used fairly interchangeably with New Southgate for the area west of the Great Northern Railway – a short path from the asylum led to the station built to serve it, New Southgate railway station, which moved a short distance and remains. The station had five earlier names: the changes demonstrate a gradual erasure of the small place name "Colney Hatch" from the public psyche and in general public use. Colney Hatch was the southern hamlet, centred on a crossroads, of the medieval parish of Friern Barnet which stretched 3 miles (4.8 km) north north-west and was half as wide as long. The very rural parish until the late 19th century had one other main population centre, equally a hamlet, Whetstone.

== History ==
=== Early history ===
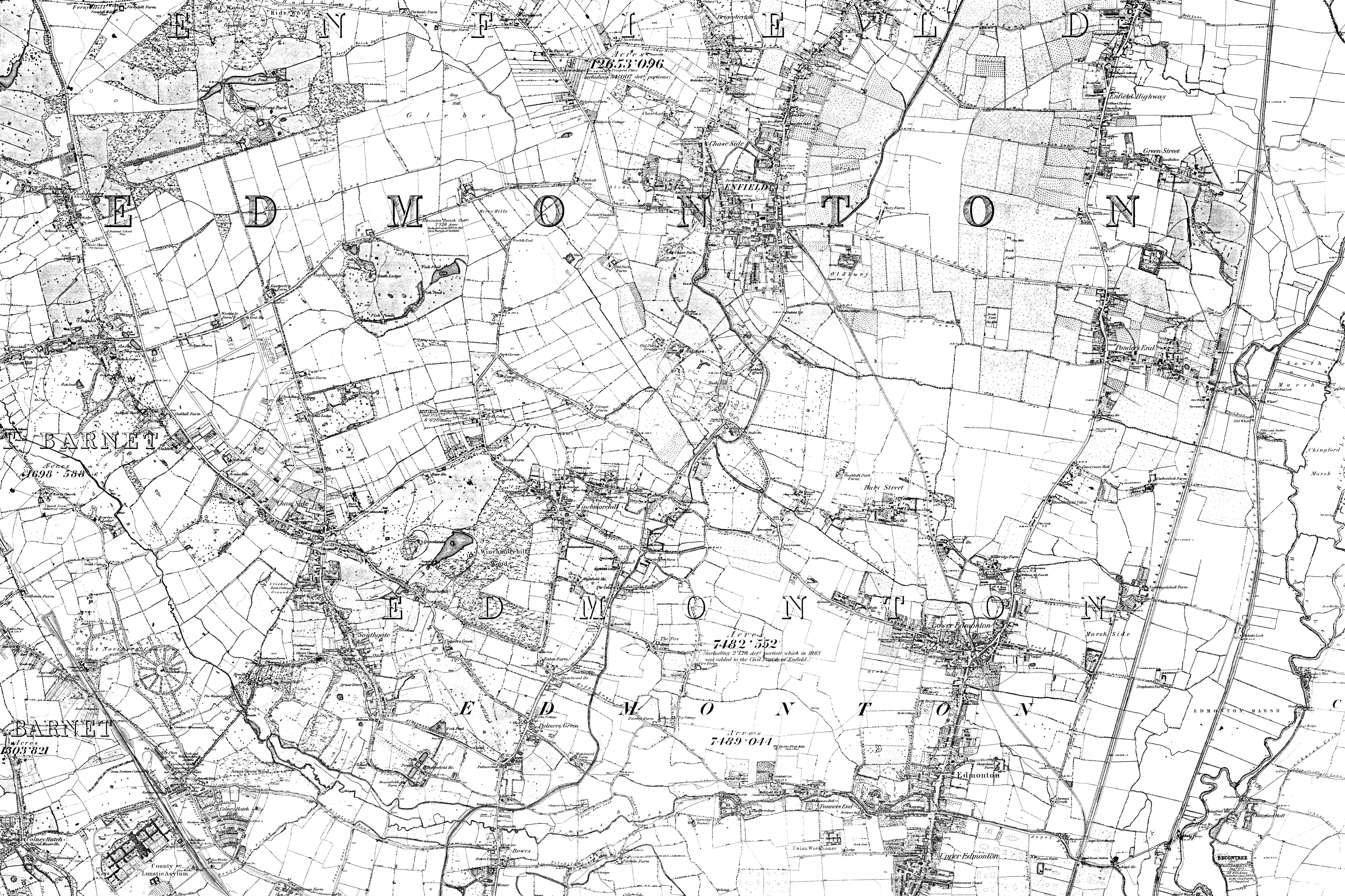
Extract from Map of Middlesex, Ordnance Survey, 1868-1883

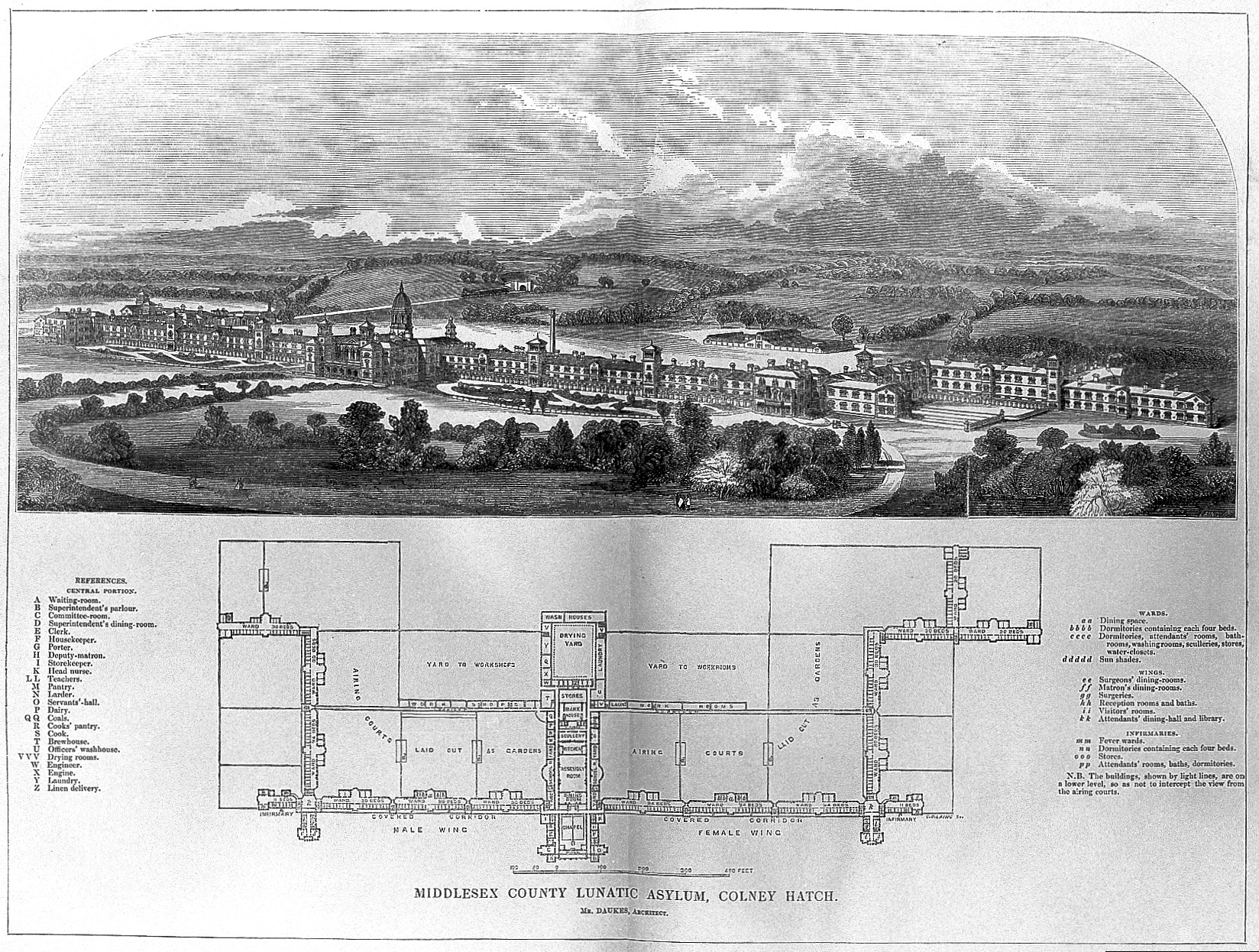
Drawing and floor plan of the Middlesex County Lunatic Asylum

The building of the asylum was commissioned by the Middlesex Court of Magistrates, as the Second Middlesex County Asylum. The site was the former Hollick Wood, Colney Hatch. The architect was Samuel Daukes, whose Italianate corridor-plan design was based on the advice of John Conolly, the superintendent of the First Middlesex County Asylum. The foundation stone was laid by the Prince Consort in 1849, and the building was completed in November 1850. The cost of building had been estimated at £150,000, but the final cost actually proved to be £300,000, making it the most expensive asylum ever built, at £240 per bed. The estate had its own water supply, a chapel, cemetery and a 75-acre farm estate. It also had a gasworks, brewery, and an aviary where canaries were bred.

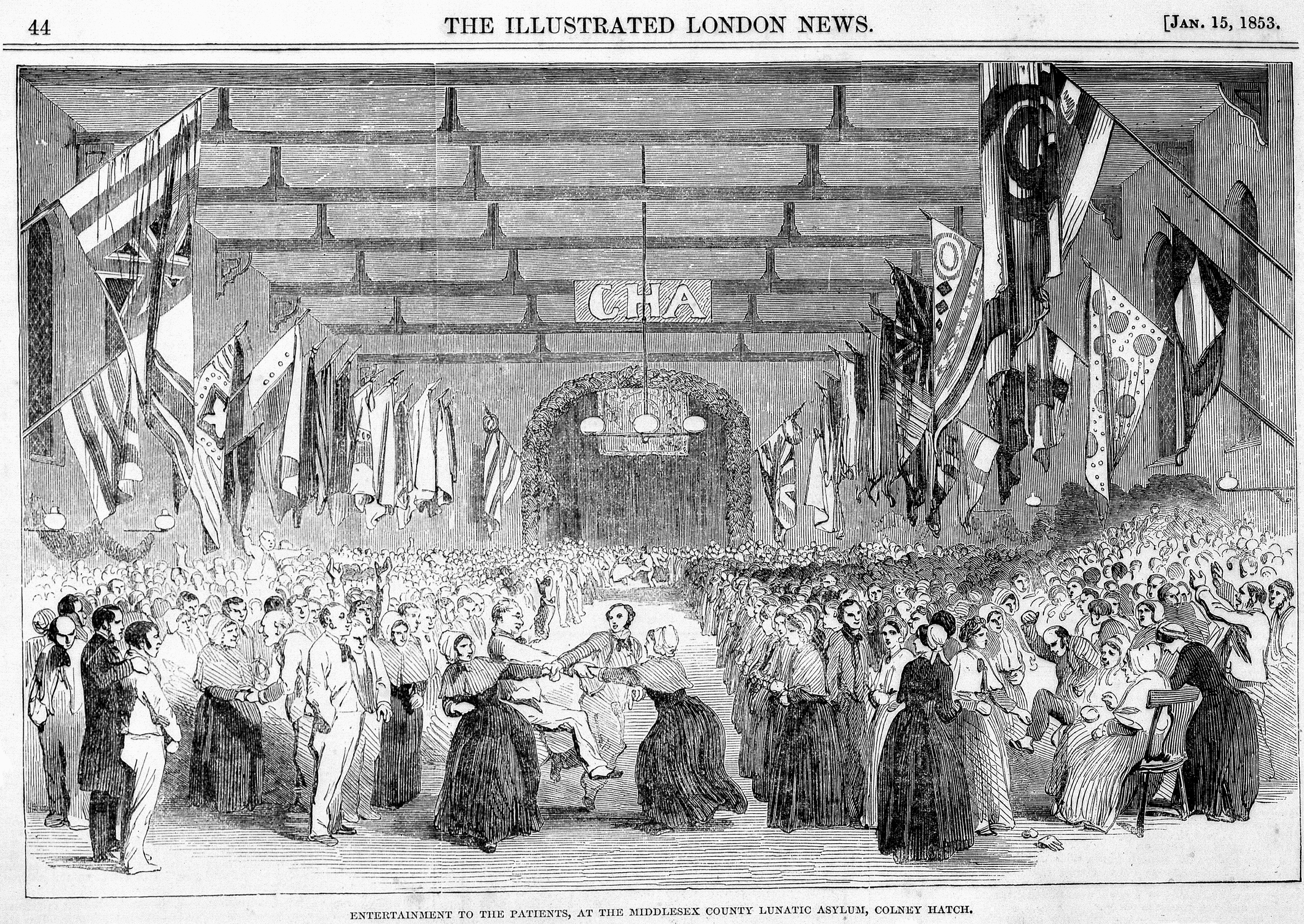
Entertainment for patients at Middlesex County Asylum, 1853

The asylum was opened on 17 July 1851 by Prince Albert with William Charles Hood (1824–1870) being its first medical superintendent. Its Chairman from 1862 to 1890 was Sir William Henry Wyatt.

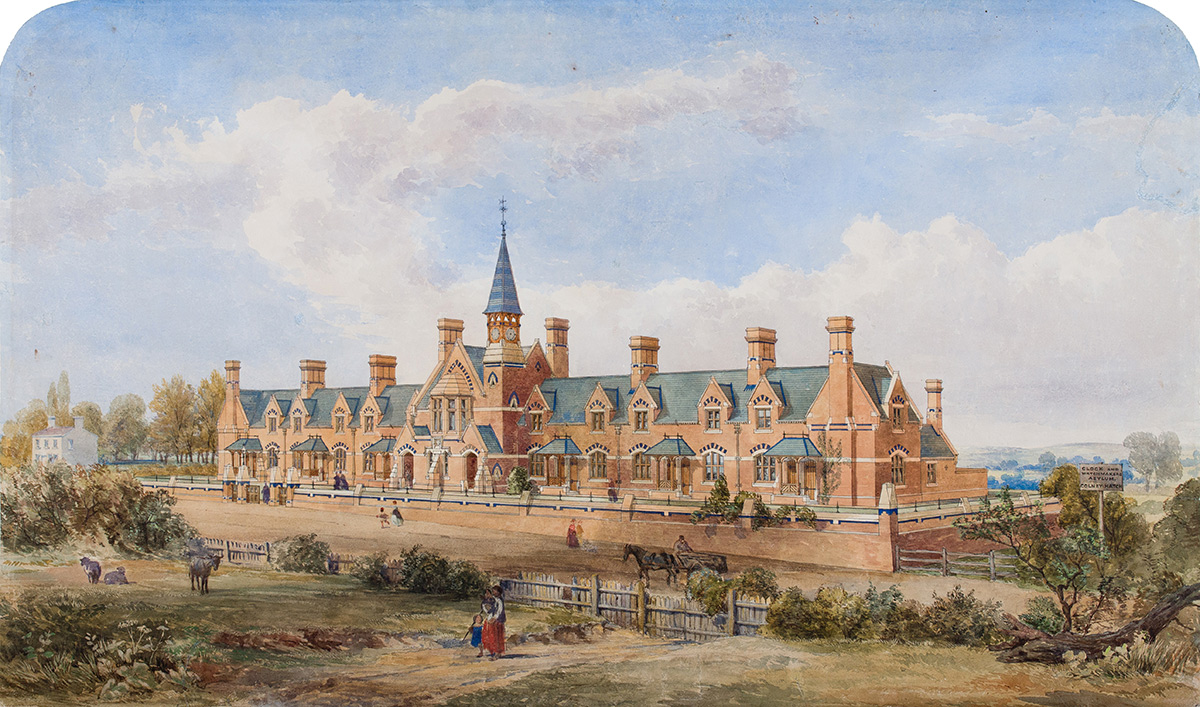
Watercolour architectural elevation of the 'Clock and Watchmaker's Asylum, Colney Hatch' by unknown artist, circa 1855

In 1857 extensions were built to bring the total number of inmates to 2,000. By this time, serious defects of construction had become apparent: in one ward the walls and rafters separated and the arched ceiling gave way while in another ward part of the ceiling collapsed. It was found that the roof was insufficient and that the foundations were insecure, necessitating reinforcement works in 1858.

Further extensions were added from 1875 to 1879, and by 1880 conditions for inmates had become very poor. In 1896, a temporary building of wood and corrugated iron was erected to house 320 chronic and infirm female patients in five dormitories, despite warnings from the Commissioners in Lunacy that this would pose a serious fire risk.

In 1889 control of the asylum was transferred to the newly formed London County Council.

=== Early 20th century ===
On 27 January 1903, the temporary building erected in 1896 was destroyed by a fire which claimed 52 lives, all female. In its place, between 1908 and 1913 seven new permanent brick villas were built: four for the survivors of the fire, one for boys with epilepsy or "disturbed behaviour" and two for patients with tuberculosis or dysentery. In 1912 a disused carpenters' shop and stores by the railway siding were converted into additional accommodation for male patients and further extensions were made to staff accommodation in 1927, by which time staff included 9 full-time doctors, 494 nurses and 171 probationers.

In 1930, following the Mental Treatment Act, the asylum was renamed the Colney Hatch Mental Hospital. In 1937 a female nurses' home was built, the resulting transfer of staff allowing the accommodation of 89 female patients in the old nurses' block. In the same year the hospital was once again renamed, this time as Friern Mental Hospital.

=== Second World War ===
During the Second World War twelve wards were requisitioned for use by the Emergency Medical Service (EMS) to be run by St Bartholomew's Hospital. The wards were used to accommodate 900 civilian war casualties and the displaced mental patients were redistributed around other wards and to Bexley Hospital in Kent. In 1941 five villas were destroyed by bombs and thirty-six patients and four nurses were killed. By 1944 the hospital had 2,557 beds for mental patients and 746 EMS beds.

=== National Health Service ===
In 1948 the hospital became part of the newly formed National Health Service. In 1958 a new 145-bed admission unit, Halliwick Hospital, was built to the northwest of the main building. The 1959 Mental Health Act required that the word 'mental' be omitted from hospital names, and the hospital became known as Friern Hospital.

In 1963, a café was opened for patients and visitors. Patients were able to earn up to 16/- (80p) 'pocket money' per week to spend in the café and hospital shop by working on the wards, kitchen and laundry. Male patients could also be paid in tobacco for their work.

By 1965, Friern Hospital housed 899 male and 1,037 female patients and employed 116 male and 113 female nurses plus 43 male and 33 female student nurses. In July 1965 Lord Strabolgi, speaking in the House of Lords, criticised the hospital for the number of patients who were there merely because they were old. A Committee of Enquiry held in 1966 found that the hospital accommodated 708 patients over the age of 60 years, of whom 253 (36%) were not considered by clinicians to be in need of psychiatric care. The report highlighted the lack of alternative accommodation for the elderly and the lack of social workers which in effect meant that there was nowhere else for elderly disturbed patients to be housed.

It was one of the hospitals investigated in 1967 as a result of the publication of Barbara Robb's book "Sans Everything". One of the allegations concerned lack of entertainment for middle-aged schizophrenic patients and of occupation for many of the elderly. The investigators concluded that "They may appear to be bored and dejected: in fact they are often incapable of animation." The Committee rejected entirely the allegation that everything in Friern was arranged for the benefit of the staff, including the suggestion that "the Physician Superintendent was seldom in the hospital for more than one or two hours a day". The latter gave evidence, which was accepted, that he attended the hospital daily from 9 am to 5.30 pm except on Wednesday afternoons.

=== Radio Friern ===
The hospital's internal broadcasting service started in 1971 after funds were raised by Minchenden Grammar School. Initially broadcasting to six wards from a studio in the patients' social club, the station expanded to cover most wards and departments within the hospital. Radio Friern moved to a new studio in premises originally occupied by the hospital dentist in 1975 increasing its broadcasting hours by the early 1980s to include programmes airing six days a week. The station continued to broadcast until the hospital's closure in 1993. Reference to the radio service in Barbara Taylor's book The Last Asylum is incorrect. Radio Friern was staffed by volunteers with day jobs away from the hospital, no patients were involved. Programmes would typically start at 5 pm weeknights as the first volunteers finished work. The weekend schedule started at 9 am. Staffed by no more than 25 people, Radio Friern was Friern Hospital's 'Big Little Station'.

=== Decline and closure ===
In 1973 the number of patients had been reduced to 1,500, and by 1979 the hospital had only 1,023 beds. In 1989 it was decided that the hospital should close and its patients reintegrated into the community where possible. Closure came in 1993, and the building and grounds were sold to Luke and Brian Comer's Comer Homes in 1995. The building was converted into luxury flats called Princess Park Manor. Residents of the development have included members of the boy band One Direction, girl bands Girls Aloud and the Sugababes, along with other pop stars and footballers.

== Notable residents ==
- Adam Ant, following a suicide attempt by an overdose of pills in 1976.
- Jenny Diski, an English writer, briefly stayed at the hospital.
- John Duffy, British serial killer and rapist.
- Maria Teresa Ferrari de Miramar (also Sanchez), one of Aleister Crowley's wives.
- Rahel Hirsch, first female medical professor in Prussia.
- Aaron Kosminski, Hyam Hyams and David Cohen, Jack the Ripper suspects.
- Dorothy Lawrence, a journalist who dressed as a man to report on the front lines of World War I.
- Barbara Taylor, then a young historian, was admitted in 1988 following a nervous breakdown. Decades later, she wrote The Last Asylum: A Memoir Of Madness In Our Times.

== In popular culture ==
The asylum is alluded to in P.G. Wodehouse's novel The Code of the Woosters. When Wodehouse's famous Jeeves and Wooster are discussing their latest predicament, Jeeves suggests that a character is eccentric, to which Wooster responds: "Eccentric? She could step straight into Colney Hatch, and no questions asked."

In G. K. Chesterton's The Man who was Thursday, the asylum is referenced as a byword for madness in the following dialog: “Your offer,” he said, “is far too idiotic to be declined. You say that a poet is always an anarchist. I disagree; but I hope at least that he is always a sportsman. Permit me, here and now, to swear as a Christian, and promise as a good comrade and a fellow-artist, that I will not report anything of this, whatever it is, to the police. And now, in the name of Colney Hatch, what is it?”

The asylum is again referenced (as a byword for madness) in chapter 8 of the children's novel The Magician's Nephew, part of the Chronicles of Narnia by C.S Lewis: when Jadis proclaims herself as an Empress and demands that residents of London bow to her, they jeeringly respond by saying in Cockney dialect, "Three cheers for the Hempress of Colney 'atch!"

Lindsay Anderson's 1982 film Britannia Hospital used the hospital's buildings and entrance gates for exterior scenes.

Will Self's 2012 novel Umbrella is largely set in the hospital. It also features in Margaret Drabble's The Pure Gold Baby.

== See also ==
- Healthcare in London
