= Comer Group =

International property developer

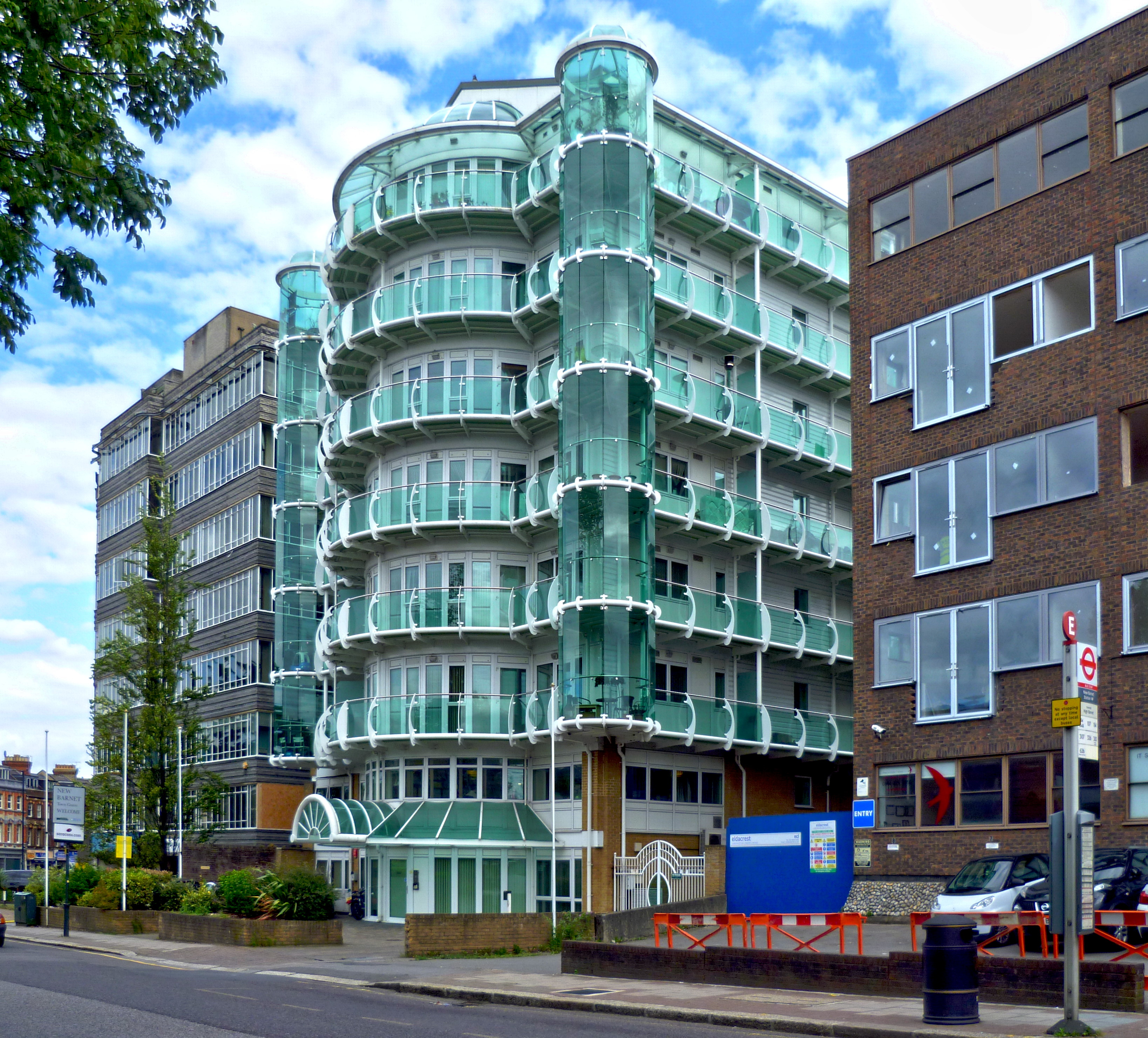
Comer House, New Barnet. A Comer residential development.

Comer Group is an international property development firm established by brothers Luke and Brian Comer. The company has its headquarters in London, and is mainly active in the UK and Ireland.

== History ==
Luke and Brian Comer were plasterers from County Galway, Ireland, who moved to London in 1984 and expanded into property development. They set up the first of their many property development companies in 1985. Comer Group Limited was incorporated in 2003.

The growth of the brothers' business in Ireland was helped by investments in stalled 'Celtic Tiger' developments and buying up heavily discounted properties. By May 2023, the brothers were running a property portfolio with an estimated value of over €1 billion.

== Projects ==
The companies' UK projects included the conversion of the listed Friern Hospital (formerly Colney Hatch Lunatic Asylum) to residential accommodation in the mid-1990s as Princess Park Manor, redevelopment of the former Royal Masonic School for Boys in Bushey, Hertfordshire as Royal Connaught Park, a housing development in Portland, Dorset, and a proposed conversion of a former office block in Southend into residential apartments. In Ireland, Comer projects include redevelopment of the University College Dublin veterinary college in Ballsbridge, redevelopment of the Corrib Great Southern Hotel in Galway, completion of a partly-built tower block, the Sentinel, in the Sandyford district of Dublin, and redevelopment of an apartment block in Ballysadare, County Sligo.

In July 2023, Comer launched an affordable home division, Dovepark Properties, to manage and maintain units across the group's UK residential developments.

=== Mast Quay, Woolwich ===
In September 2023, Comer Homes Group was ordered to demolish a build-to-rent development at Mast Quay in the Woolwich Dockyard area of southeast London. The second phase of Mast Quay, east of phase 1 (and adjacent to the Woolwich Ferry carpark), was completed in late 2022 and comprised towers of 23, 11, nine and six storeys, but differed markedly from what had originally been proposed. Comer proposed revisions to the design in December 2022 when construction was nearly finished. However, the build-to-rent development had "26 main deviations to the original planning permission" granted in 2012, and in September 2023, Greenwich Council ordered Comer Homes to demolish the blocks. Comer appealed against the enforcement notice. A planning inquiry was opened in July 2024. In January 2025, the Planning Inspectorate upheld 11 out of the council's 26 objections. The demolition order was conditionally revoked, with Comer given three years to fix issues at the development and ordered to pay £4.4m towards affordable housing, and £2.3m in community infrastructure levy payments. The firm was ordered to replace "visually intrusive" orange cladding, provide promised accessibility features, undertake fire safety work and make public realm improvements at the base of the buildings. Comer Homes accepted the original scheme had not been lawfully implemented and that the existing buildings did not have planning permission; revised planning permission was issued. The demolition order was upheld as an 'ultimate sanction' if the conditions are not met.

== Photo gallery ==
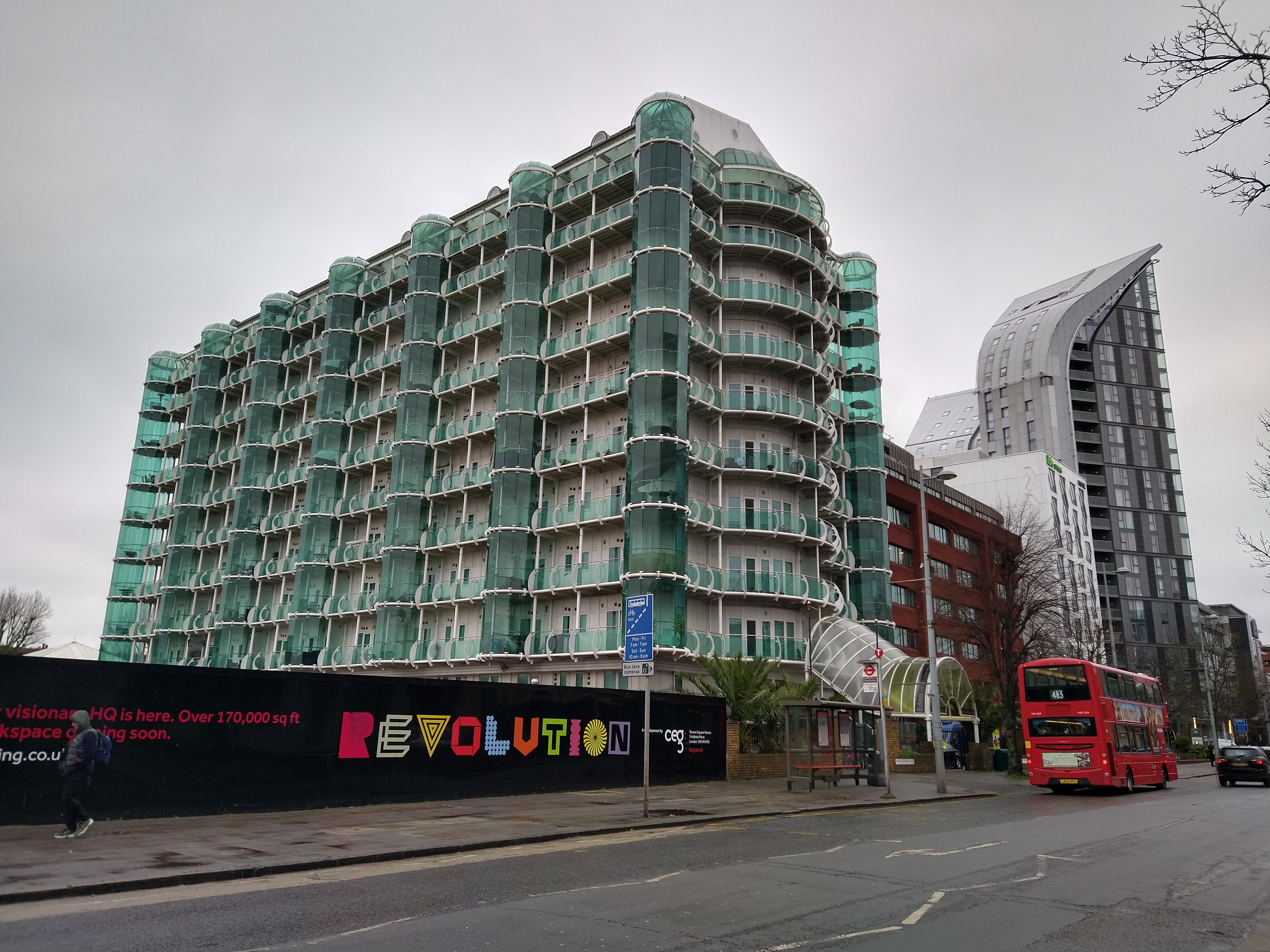
Cavalier House, Uxbridge Road, Ealing, London W5.

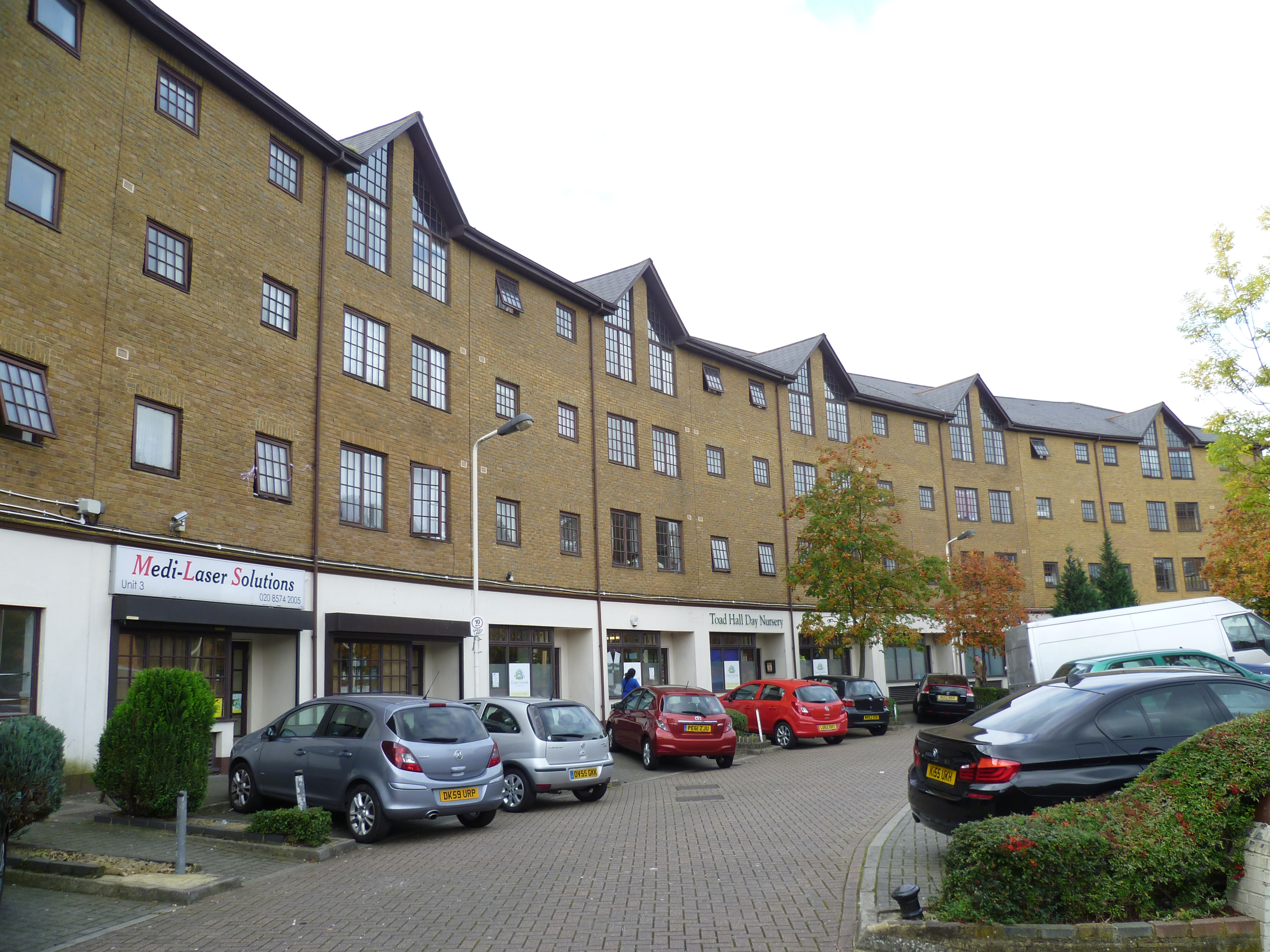
Comer Crescent, Southall, UB2.

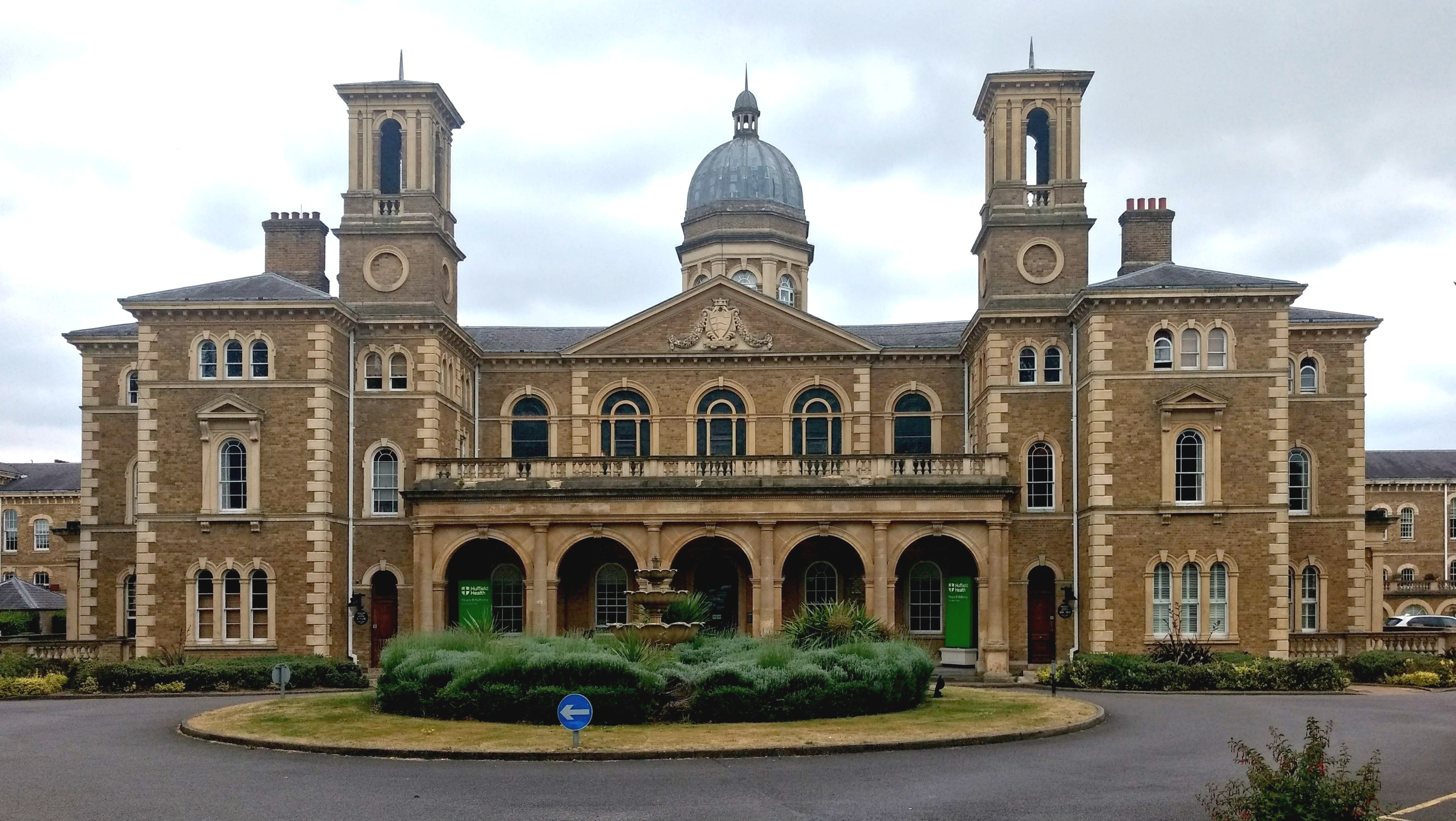
Friern Hospital, New Southgate.

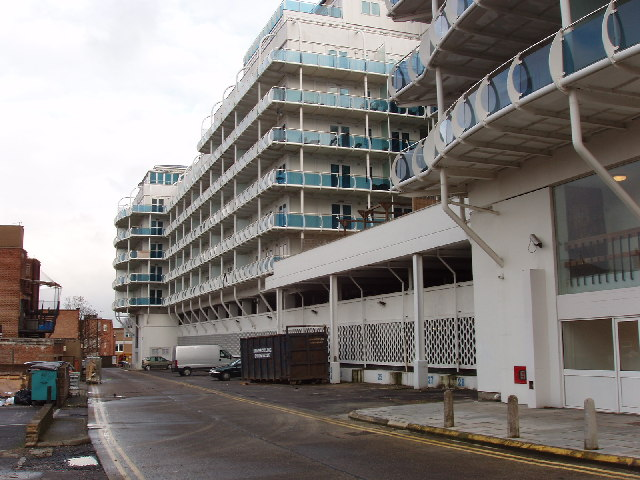
Platinum House, Harrow.

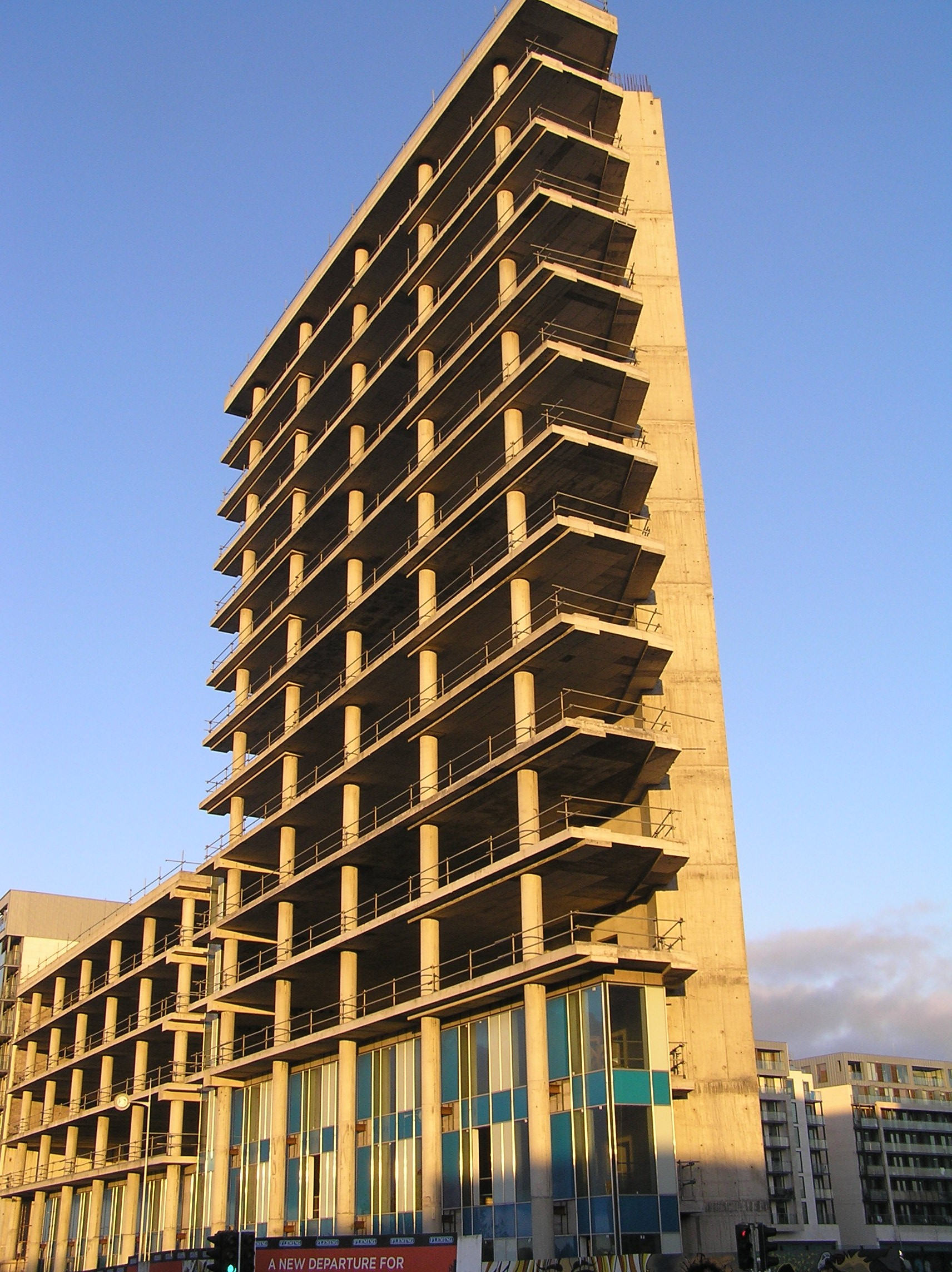
'The Sentinel' - an unfinished apartment tower in Sandyford, Dublin, acquired by the Comer Group
