= Rahel Hirsch =

German doctor (1870–1953)

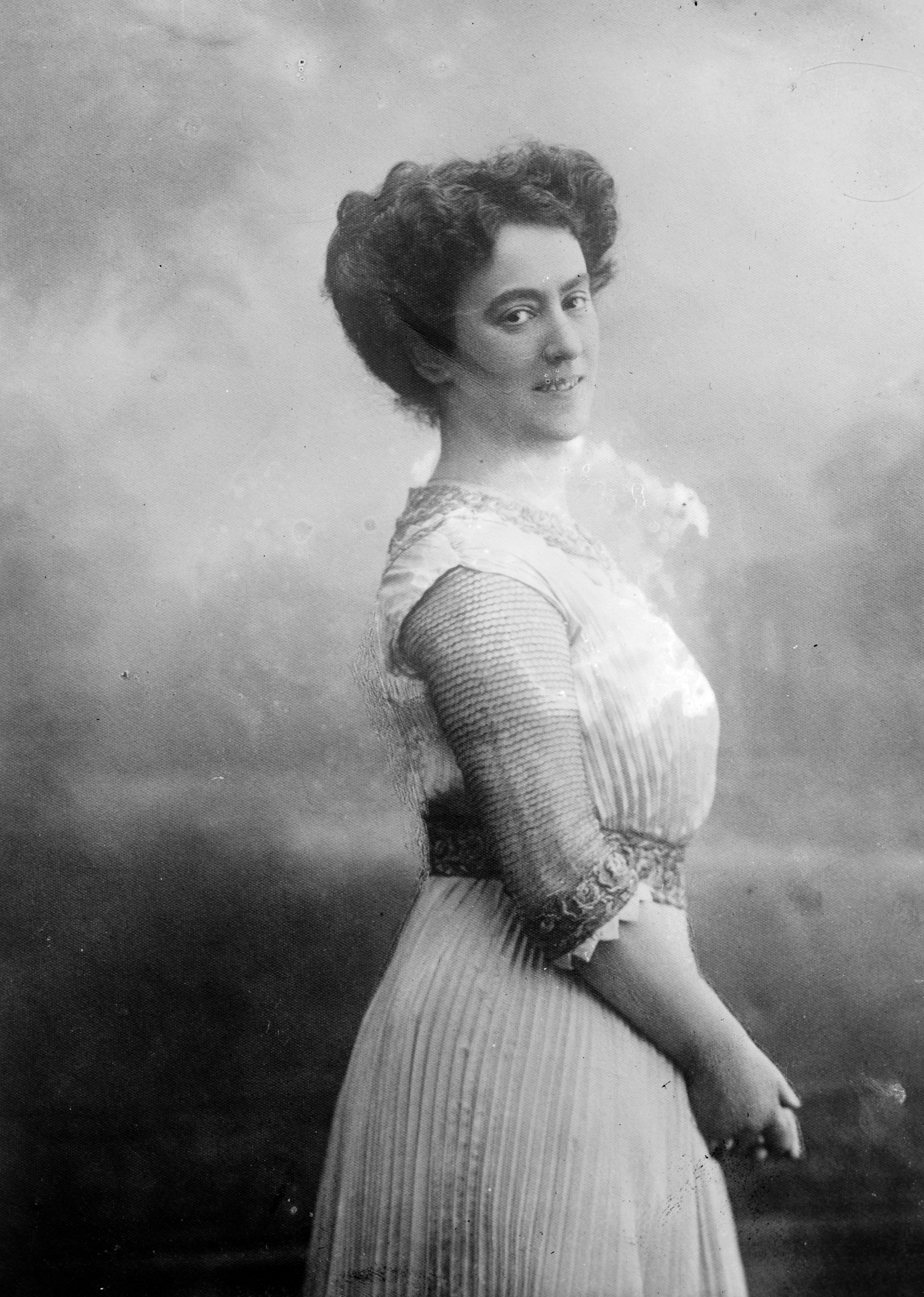
Rahel Hirsch circa 1914

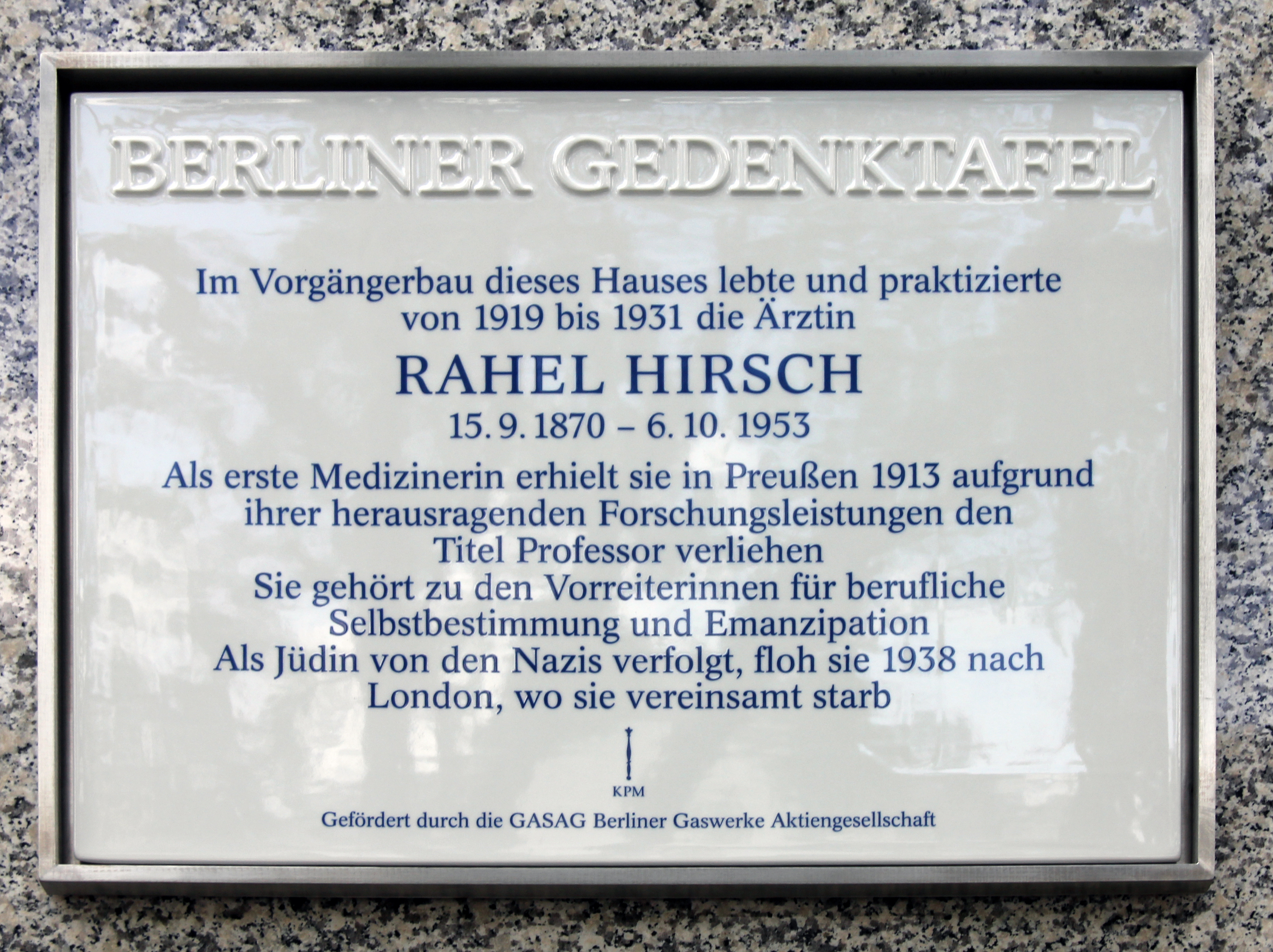
Commemorative plaque on the house at Kurfürstendamm 220, Charlottenburg, Berlin

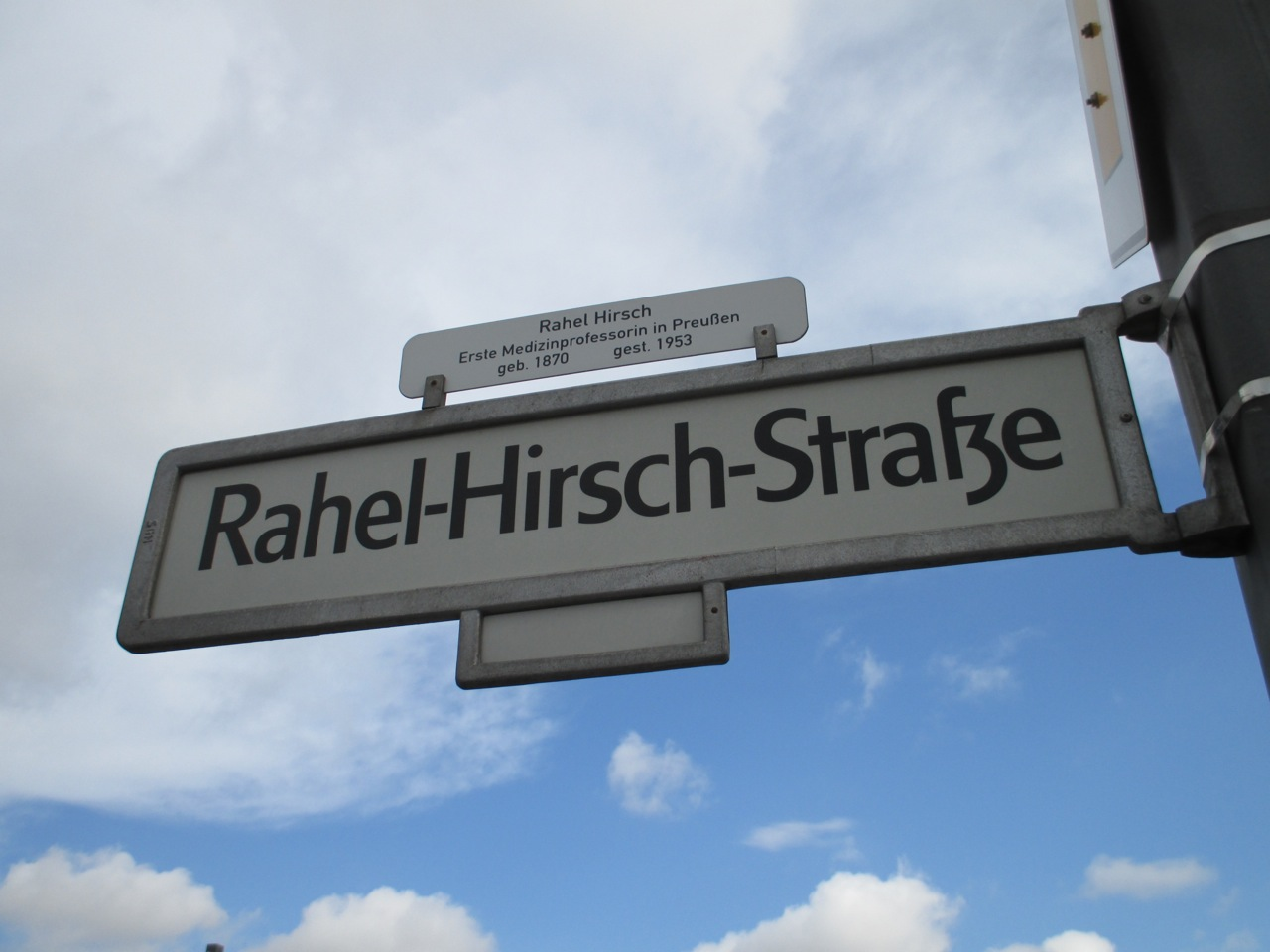
Street sign, Berlin

Rahel Hirsch (15 September 1870 – 6 October 1953) was a German physician and professor at the Charité medical school in Berlin. In 1913 she became the first woman in the Kingdom of Prussia to be appointed a professor of medicine.

== Biography ==
Rahel Hirsch was born on 15 September 1870 in Frankfurt am Main, one of eleven children of Mendel Hirsch (in German) (1833–1900). Mendel Hirsch was the director of the girls' school of the Jewish religious community in Frankfurt am Main. Mendel's father – Rahel's paternal grandfather – was the eminent rabbi Samson Raphael Hirsch.

From 1885 to 1889, Rahel Hirsch studied for her degree in education in Wiesbaden; she then worked until 1898 as a teacher. The German Reich did not permit women to study medicine so she studied in Zurich, Switzerland. In 1899 she continued to study in Leipzig, Germany and Strasbourg, France to earn her medical doctor title in 1903.

In 1906, Rahel Hirsch was the first scientist to demonstrate that small solid particles – of no more than 0.1 mm – could penetrate the kidneys and pass into the urine: the previous belief had been that this was only possible with liquids. She was mocked at a meeting of the Society of the Charité's Directors and her research was ignored. However, in 1957, G. Volkheimer, an assistant at Charité, came across her work and publicized it, naming it the "Hirsch Effekt."

She was then hired to work at the Medical Clinic of the University of Berlin at the Charité as an intern. The Charité was militarily strong and she was the second female to ever be hired here. Hirsch worked as an assistant to the physiologist Professor Friedrich Krause. Rahel Hirsch worked alongside the surgeon Ernst von Bergmann and the anatomist Wilhelm von Waldeyer-Hartz.

In 1908, Hirsch was appointed head of the polyclinic at the Charité's Medical Clinic; however, she was never a paid employee there. After being replaced, she left the Charité and started her own internal medicine practice in Berlin. At her private practice, she had modern x-ray equipment and wealthy clientele that allowed her to live comfortably.

Rahel Hirsch was the first female to be awarded the title of Professor in Prussia in 1913.

In 1914, Hirsch published a study titled “Accidents and Internal Medicine.”

As a Jewish woman Hirsch was prohibited from teaching. She went on to write a treatise titled the "Physical Culture of Women." She wrote to counter the medical prejudice against physical activity for women and favored naturally-fitting clothing. Hirsch tried to bring attention to women's public health by raising awareness about hygiene, nutrition, and physical strengthening. In an article published in the Munich Medical Weekly, she writes to her male colleagues to not look at women from just the point of view of a gynecologist. She also argued that women's inferiority to men due to their biologically determined lighter brains was not true. She stated that women's physical and psychological weakness compared to men came from a faulty upbringing.

As Jewish persecution by the Nazis gathered momentum, Hirsch lost her professional opportunities, culminating in the cancellation of her license to practice medicine in 1938. When she learnt that she was about to be arrested, she escaped on 7 October 1938, "at the last minute," to England, aged 68. In England, Hirsch could not practise as a doctor: instead she worked as a librarian and a laboratory assistant. During the war she lived in Yorkshire, returning to London afterwards. Her treatment by the Nazis manifested itself in the form of depression, hallucinations and a persecution complex; as a result, she was committed to Friern Hospital in North London, where she died on 6 October 1953. Hirsch is buried at the United Synagogue cemetery in Bushey, about 15 km (9.3 mi) northwest of Friern.

== Legacy ==
Her reputation was upheld by G. Volkheimer. Many internal medicine textbooks refer to the “Hirsch Effekt” and the State of Israel honored her by including her in the gallery of Famous Jewish Scientists in Jerusalem. In 1995, a bronze statue of Rahel Hirsch stands in the old lecture hall at the Charité.

Germany issued a postage stamp in 2013 to commemorate the centenary of Rahel Hirsch being appointed as the first female professor of medicine in the Kingdom of Prussia. The Rahel-Hirsch-Schule, a vocational sixth-form centre with an emphasis on medical-related training, was thus named in 2013. It lies in the Hellersdorf district, about 17 km (11 mi) to the east of the Charité.

A road in front of the new Berlin Hauptbahnhof now bears her name.

The Charité/Berlin Institute of Health's new Ambulanz-, Translations- und Innovationszentrum was topped out in July 2020 and on 19 January 2023 was named the "Rahel Hirsch Center for Translational Medicine". The ceremony was attended by the current Mayor of Berlin, Franziska Giffey, as well as Charité officials and Hirsch's relatives from London.
