= St Andrew the Apostle Greek Orthodox School =

Free school in Brunswick Park, Greater London, England

Coordinates: 51.6250°N 0.1503°W

St. Andrew the Apostle School

Location
- Building 5, North London Business Park; Brunswick Park, Greater London, N11 1GN; England

Information
- Type: Free school
- Motto: Ever to Excel
- Religious affiliation: Greek Orthodox
- Established: 2013
- Trust: Russell Education Trust
- Department for Education URN: 139410 Tables
- Ofsted: Reports
- Head teacher: Chris Martin
- Gender: Coeducational
- Age: 11 to 18
- Enrollment: 603
- Capacity: 1050
- Colours: Navy and green
- Website: www.standrewtheapostle.org.uk

St Andrew the Apostle School is a secondary school in Brunswick Park, Barnet, opened in 2013.

It is the first and only state-funded Greek Orthodox secondary school in Britain. The school is named after St Andrew the Apostle. It serves families from all backgrounds and the wider Greek and Cypriot community. The Greek Orthodox element of the school is introduced to students through a chapel at the school and communal worship in assemblies.

The school has been established jointly by Russell Education Trust, the Greek Orthodox Church and the Classical Education Trust.

The first cohort of students completed their GCSEs in 2018, and the results put the school in the top 5% of the country.

== History ==
The school opened in September 2013 with its first cohort of Year 7 students and the founding headteacher, Robert Ahearn.

In October 2013, the school was visited by the then First Lady of Cyprus, Andri Anastasiades, who gave a speech.

In 2016, the school was reported to receive £18,507 in state funding for each of its 73 pupils, compared to a national average of £4,767 per local authority pupil, giving it the highest amount of funding per pupil in England.

The school is regularly visited by Archbishop Nikitas of Thyateira and Great Britain.

== Site ==
St Andrew the Apostle Schools former buildings had two sites, building 4 and 5. Building 5 is its first and main site, a former college. Local sports amenities such as Bethune Park are used for physical education.

In 2018, an office block within the business park was converted into the second building for the school, named building 4. In February 2020, the department of education and the local council agreed to build a new school building within the business park.

In September 2022, the construction of the new school building commenced and is expected to be completed by September 2025.

In June 2023, the foundations of the new building were laid with the blessing of Archbishop Nikitas. Several other guests were present including the school’s founding headteacher, Robert Ahearn, and the borough's MP, Theresa Villiers.

The new building is now fully operational
