= Luke and Brian Comer =

Irish property developers

- Occupation: Property developers
- Known for: Founders and owners of the Comer Group

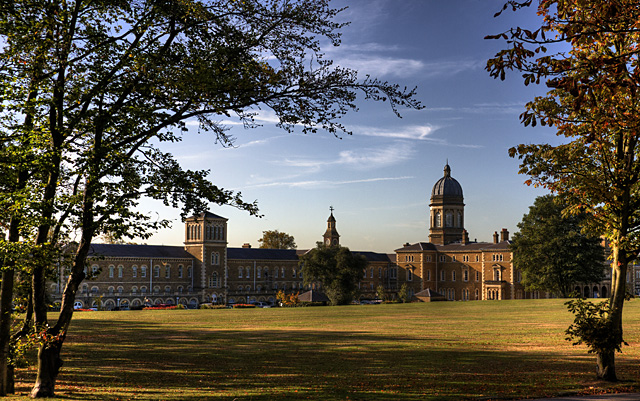
Princess Park Manor, Friern Barnet. A former hospital converted to residential accommodation by Comer Group in the 1990s

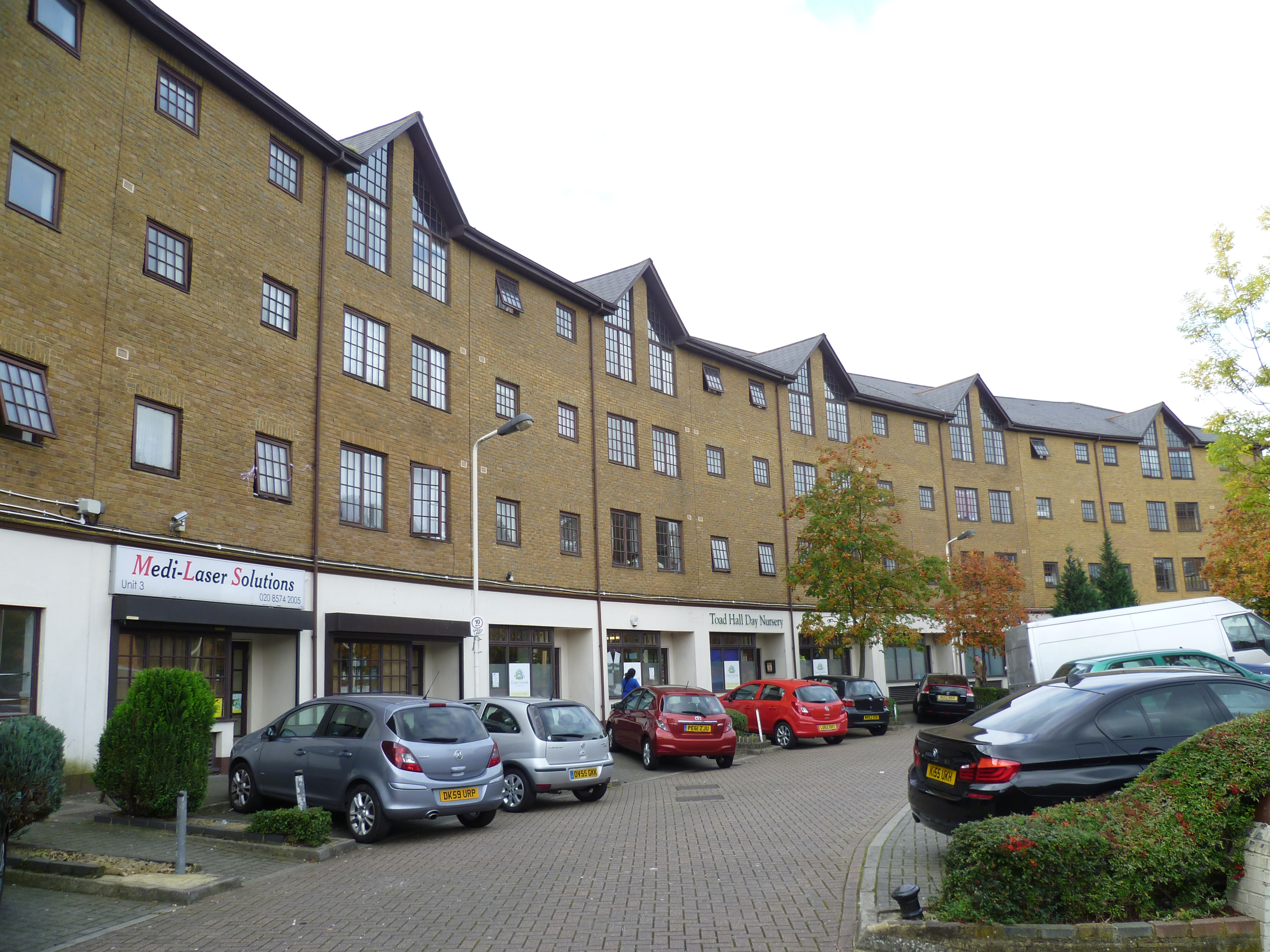
Comer Crescent, Southall. Built by Comer Homes in 1997

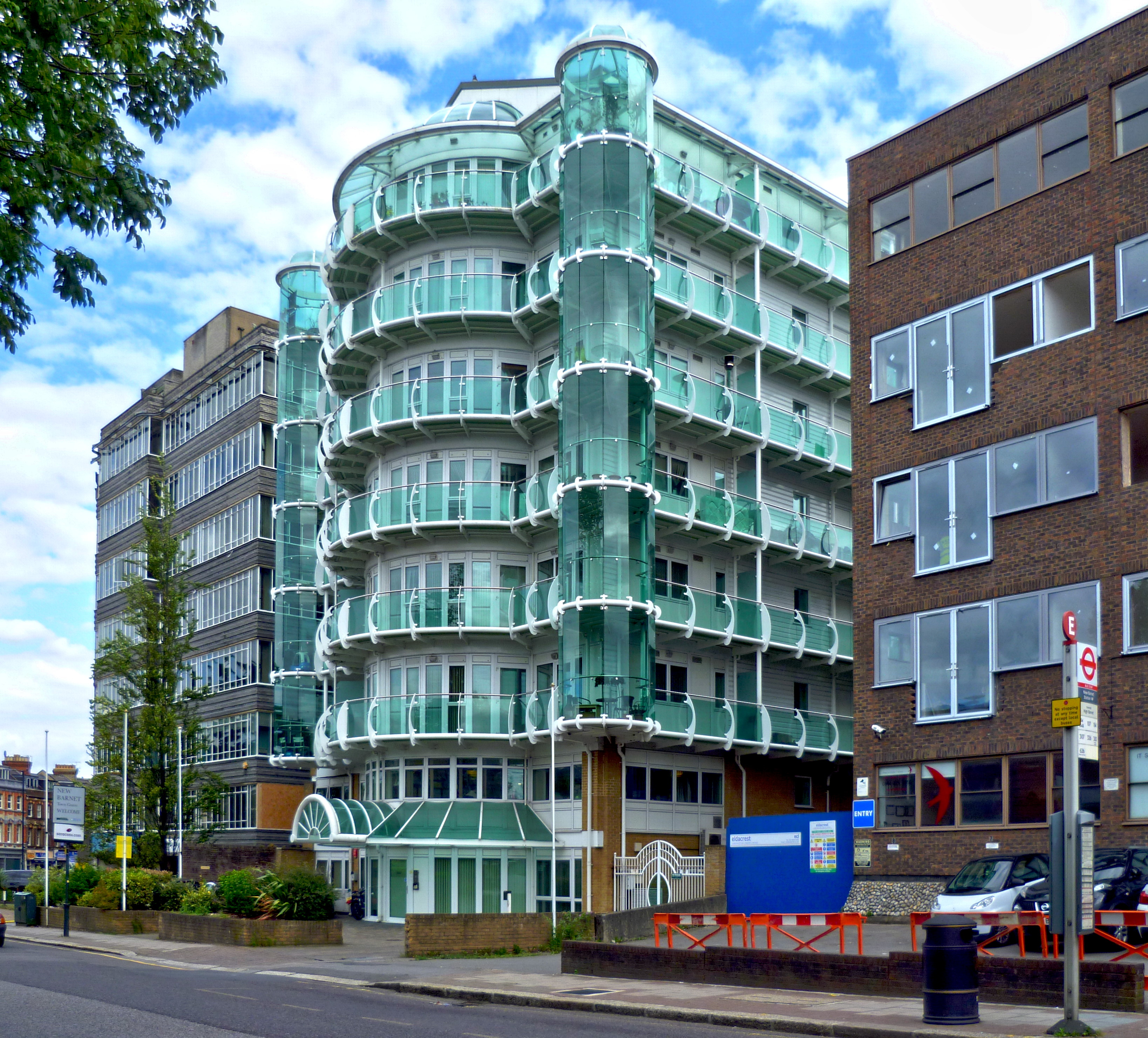
Comer House, New Barnet, London. A Comer residential development

Luke and Brian Comer are Irish billionaire property developers and the founders and owners of the Comer Group, a privately owned UK-based international property development company.

== Early life ==
The Comer brothers come from Glenamaddy, County Galway, in Ireland. Luke is the older brother, born in November 1957; Brian was born in January 1960. The brothers left school in their early teens to work as plasterers.

== Property development career ==
After moving to London in 1984, working first as plasterers, the brothers into property development. Since then their focus has shifted to Germany and then to Ireland in 2010, in their quest for value for money.

The brothers' projects include the conversion of the listed Friern Hospital (formerly Colney Hatch Asylum) to residential accommodation in the mid-1990s as Princess Park Manor.

The Comers invested more than €75 million in property purchases in Ireland, the UK, and Germany in a six-month period (November 2015-April 2016) and reported plans to invest an additional €200 million in the 18 months to follow. In 2017, two farmers in Ireland filed suit against the brothers over land rights to five acres of grazing territory in north county Dublin.

In 2018, the Comers purchased Kilmartin House, a 111-acre piece of land in Dublin 15 to be used for a residential development. In May 2018 it was reported that the Beckett Building, which was purchased by the Comer Brothers in 2013 for roughly €5 million, was sold to Kookmin Bank for €101 million.

According to the Sunday Times Rich List in 2026, the brothers had a net worth of £946 million.

=== Mast Quay Phase II ===
In September 2023, Greenwich Council ordered the demolition of the Comer Group project Mast Quay Phase II in the Woolwich Dockyard area of southeast London, after 26 major deviations from the planning permission granted in 2012 were highlighted.

== Galway United ==
Since 2013 the brothers have sponsored Galway United and invested several million in the club. In March 2022 the Galway United Friends Co-operative Society voted to allow a bid by the Comer Group to become the majority owners of the club.

== Horse racing ==
Luke Comer, who is resident in Monaco for tax purposes, breeds and trained race horses in Ireland. In September 2023 his trainer's licence was suspended for three years after twelve of his horses tested positive for anabolic steroids. He was fined €60,000 for the positive tests and an additional €5,000 for having incorrectly told the Irish Horseracing Regulatory Board (IHRB) that he had an unblemished record. He was also ordered to pay 80% of the IHRB's legal costs, amounting to a bill of around £644,000. In June 2024, he lost an appeal against the suspension. In August 2024 Luke Comer's son, Luke Comer junior, had his licence suspended by the IHRB and was ordered to pay €20,000 to Treo Eile (an organisation for rehoming and retraining retired racehorses) after horse carcases were found on his land.

In September 2026, Luke Comer senior was disqualified from racing as he had failed to pay the IHRB €1,391,197.80 owed to them. As a disqualified person, he is no longer allowed to train or own any horse entered in a race or to enter a racecourse except as a member of the public.
