= William Charles Hood =

British psychiatric doctor (1824–1870)

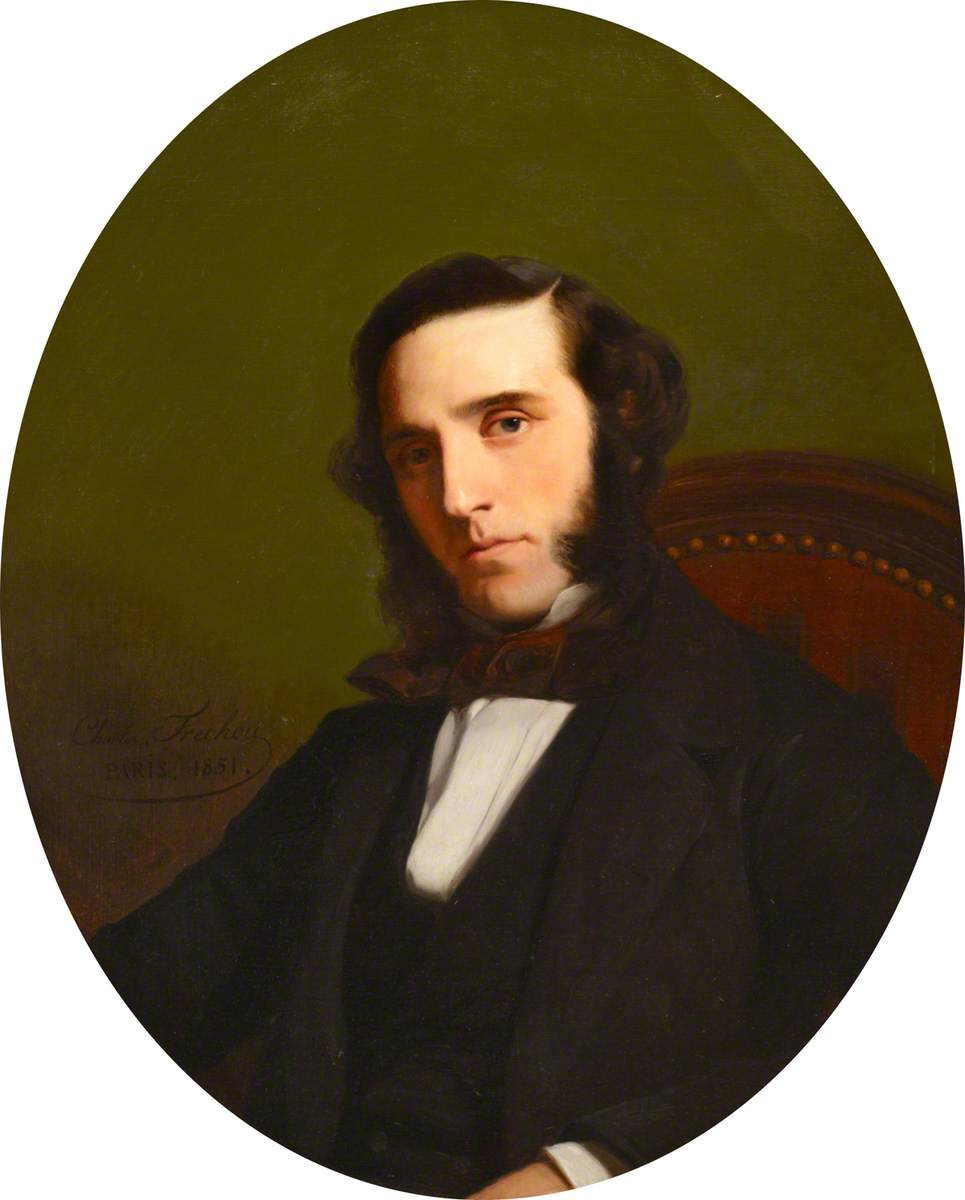
William Charles Hood in 1851

Sir William Charles Hood (1824 – 4 January 1870) was a British medical doctor and psychiatrist of the Victorian era who pioneered the humane treatment of the mentally ill. As Superintendent at Bethlem Royal Hospital in London he reformed and civilised the hospital's regime.

== Early life ==
Hood was born at Lambeth in London, the son of Ann née Brown and William Chamberlain Hood (1790–1879), a surgeon, later a medical doctor. He attended school in Brighton in Sussex before being admitted to Trinity College Dublin in 1841 aged 17. He obtained his professional training in medicine at Guy's Hospital, qualifying in 1845 before taking his M.D. at the University of St Andrews in 1846. He became a Fellow of the Royal College of Physicians of Edinburgh (F.R.C.P. Edin.) in 1849, and a Member of the Royal Colleges of Surgeons (M.R.C.S. Eng.) in 1845. He was appointed Physician and Superintendent at Finnington House, a private asylum in Devizes. In 1851 Hood was appointed as Physician and the first Medical Superintendent at the newly opened Second Middlesex County Asylum.

== Bethlem Royal Hospital ==
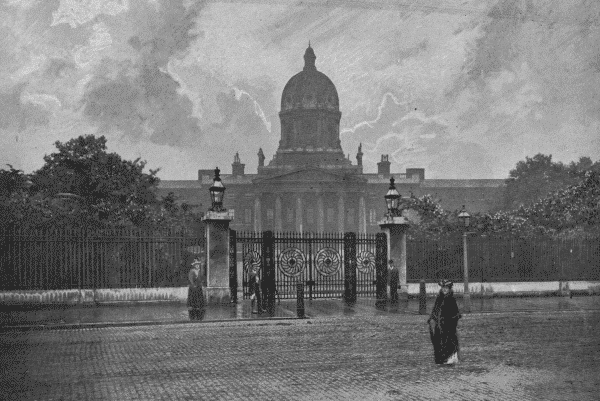
A view of Bethlem Hospital, published in 1896

From 1852 to 1862 Hood was the resident Physician and Superintendent of Bethlem Royal Hospital, living there with his wife and family; he "worked indefatigably for the improvement of the patients' conditions, and particularly for the segregation of the criminal insane".

At Bethlem, Hood "carried out many excellent and necessary reforms", including removing the bars from the windows, carpeting bedroom floors, replacing wooden benches and tables with armchairs and sofas, putting paintings on the walls and statues and busts in the wards, abolishing forcibly restraining the patients and allowing some to go on supervised day visits to Kew Gardens and the Crystal Palace.

An article by Henry Morley in Charles Dickens's Household Words describes some of the changes made by Hood at Bethlem:

Within the entrance gates, as we went round the lawn towards the building, glancing aside, we saw several groups of patients quietly sunning themselves in the garden, some playing on a grass-plot with two or three happy little children. We found afterwards that these were the children of the Resident Physician and Superintendent, Dr Hood. They are trusted freely among the patients, and the patients take great pleasure in their presence among them. The sufferers feel that surely they are not cut off from fellowship with man, not objects of a harsh distrust, when even little children come to play with them, and prattle confidently in their ears. There are no chains nor strait waistcoats now in Bethlehem; yet, upon the staircase of a ward occupied by men the greater number of whom would, in the old time, have been beheld by strong-nerved adults with a shudder, there stood a noble little boy, another fragment of the Resident Physician's family, with a bright smile upon his face, who looked like an embodiment of the good spirit that had found its way into the hospital, and chased out all the gloom.

== Later years ==
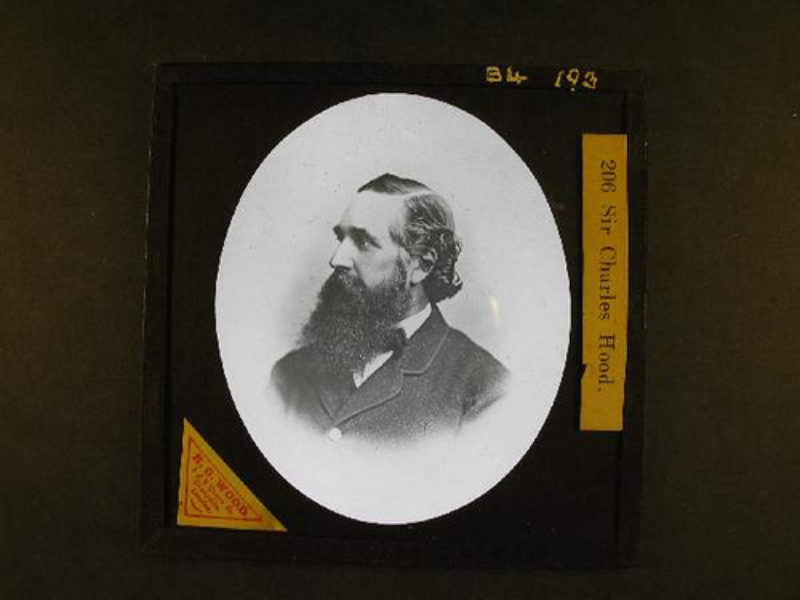
Sir William Charles Hood in later life

Hood was a Fellow of the Medical and Chirurgical Society of London; a Fellow of the Pathological Society; and a Member of the Hunterian Society. In 1862 Hood resigned from his position at Bethlem Royal Hospital on his appointment as a Lord Chancellor's Visitor of Chancery Lunatics, a position which involved the regular examination of wealthy Chancery patients throughout England and Wales. He was elected treasurer of Bridewell and Bethlehem Hospitals in 1868, receiving his knighthood for services to medicine at Windsor Castle in the same year.

== Personal life ==
In 1846 he married Jane née Willett (1822–1866) with whom he had nine children: Donald William Charles Hood; Annette Louisa Jane Hood (1848–1925); Willett Charles Hood (1850–1857); Gerald Charles Hood (1852–1891); Frances Edward Charles Hood (1854–1882); Godfrey Charles Hood (1857–1903); Colin Charles Hood (1857–1915); Florence Mary Hood Ricardo (1858–1905); Basil Willett Charles Hood (1864–1917), a playwright and author who, after the early death of his parents, was brought up by his older siblings.

Sir William Charles Hood died of pleurisy in the Treasurer's House at Bridewell Hospital in 1870 aged 45. He was buried in the South Metropolitan Cemetery.

== Author ==
- Suggestions For The Future Provision Of Criminal Lunatics, London : John Churchill and Sons, 1854.
- Criminal Lunatics. A letter to the Chairman of the Commissioners in Lunacy, London, 1860.
- Statistics of Insanity : being a Decennial Report of Bethlem Hospital, from 1846 to 1855 inclusive, Bethlem Royal Hospital (London, England), 1856
- Statistics of Insanity; embracing a report of Bethlem Hospital, from 1846 to 1860 London : David Batten, 1862.
- First Medical Report of Colney Hatch Lunatic Asylum
- Reports of Bethlehem Royal Hospital
- Contributor: Reports of Cases of Insanity in The Medical Times and Gazette
