= Colney Hatch =

District of the London Borough of Barnet, England

Coordinates: 51.61054°N 0.15575°W

- Location within Greater London
- OS grid reference: TQ278918
- London borough: Barnet
- Ceremonial county: Greater London
- Region: London
- Country: England
- Sovereign state: United Kingdom
- Post town: LONDON
- Postcode district: N11, N10
- Dialling code: 020
- Police: Metropolitan
- Fire: London
- Ambulance: London
- UK Parliament: Chipping Barnet
- London Assembly: Barnet and Camden

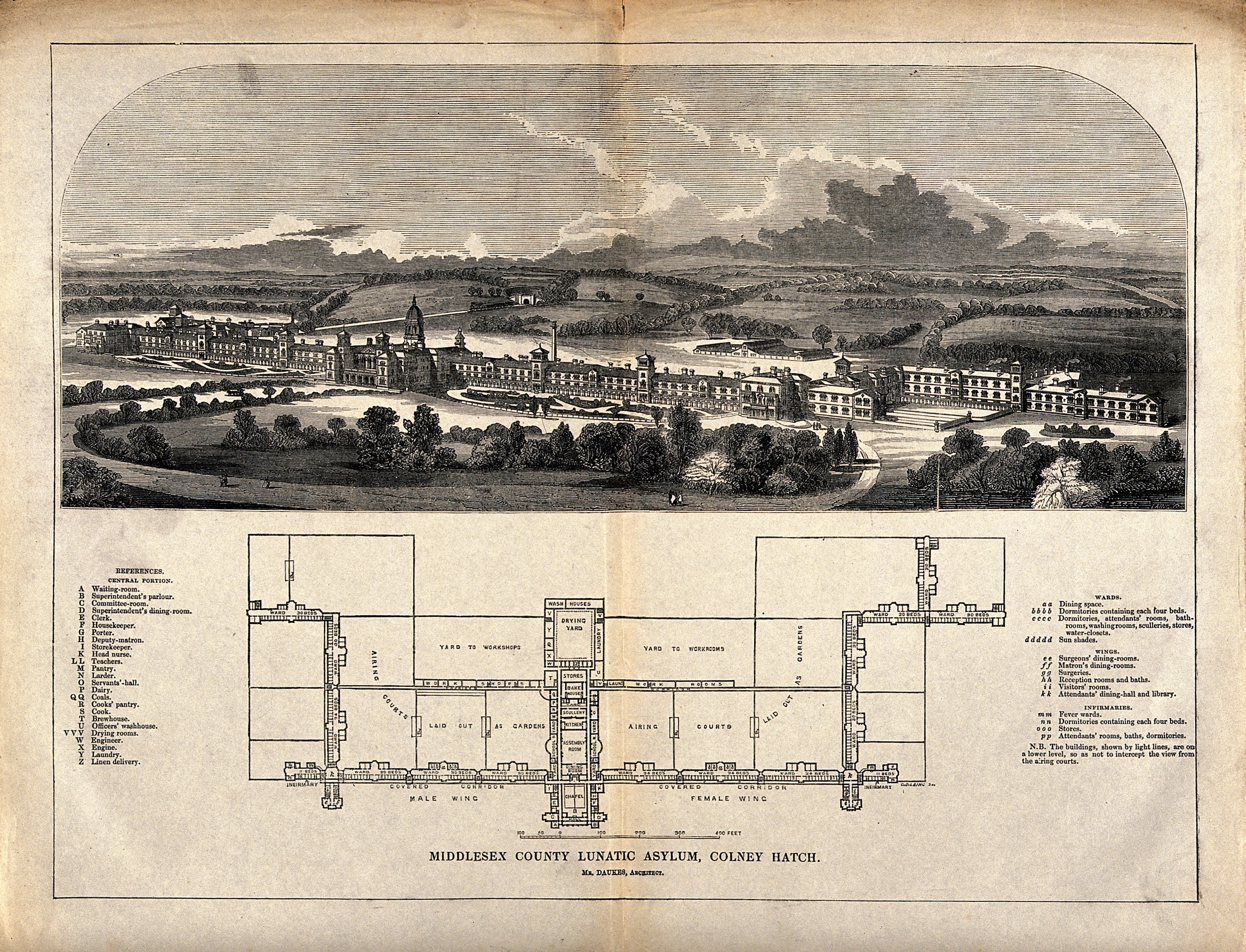
Middlesex County Lunatic Asylum at Colney Hatch

Colney Hatch (/ˈkoʊni/) is the historical name for a small district within the London Borough of Barnet in London, England. Colney Hatch refers to a loosely defined area centred on the northern end of Colney Hatch Lane (B550), which connects Friern Barnet with Muswell Hill, crossing the North Circular Road. The area is predominantly residential with a mixture of Victorian and Edwardian houses and much more recent development.

== Etymology ==
The name Colney Hatch was originally that of a hamlet in the parish of Friern (once spelt Fryern) Barnet, first recorded in the early 15th century.

The name hatch may derive from hitch-gate, often found on the borders of forests to prevent cattle straying. Colney Hatch at one time marked the southern boundary of the royal hunting ground Enfield Chase.

== History ==
The area became well known from the mid-19th century following the building of Colney Hatch Lunatic Asylum (renamed Friern Mental Hospital in 1937), which gained such notoriety that the name Colney Hatch appeared in various terms of abuse associated with the concept of madness.

It forms the meeting point between the London Borough of Barnet and the London Borough of Haringey, and stretches over the border into Colney Hatch Park in the old borough of Southgate. When various places, such as the mental hospital itself, changed their name, the borough of Southgate decided that nothing in the borough should be called Colney Hatch and changed the name of Colney Hatch Park to New Southgate, an area which crosses the boroughs and corresponds approximately to the N11 postcode district. Colney Hatch includes the location of the former Colney Hatch Lunatic Asylum on Friern Barnet Road, opened in 1851. The asylum eventually became known as Friern Hospital and was closed down in 1993. The extensive grounds on which Friern Hospital and Halliwick Hospital (its sister institution for day patients) stood have since been redeveloped as two housing estates, Princess Park Manor and Friern Village.

Nearby is New Southgate railway station, originally called Colney Hatch but renamed several times from the mid-19th century onwards, taking its present name on the electrification of the line in 1976.

William Le Queux in a novel from 1913 ,"The Wiles of the Wicked" mentions Colney Hatch. "She turned and twisted and toyed with her menu, tinkling and jingling the whole time like a coral consoler or an infant’s rattle. Little wonder, I thought, that she remained a spinster. With such an irritating person to head his household, the unfortunate husband would be a candidate for Colney Hatch within a month. Yet she was evidently a very welcome guest at Mrs Anson’s table, for my hostess addressed her as “dear,” and seemed to consider whatever positive opinion she expressed as entirely beyond dispute."
