= New Southgate railway station =

National Rail station in London, England

New Southgate
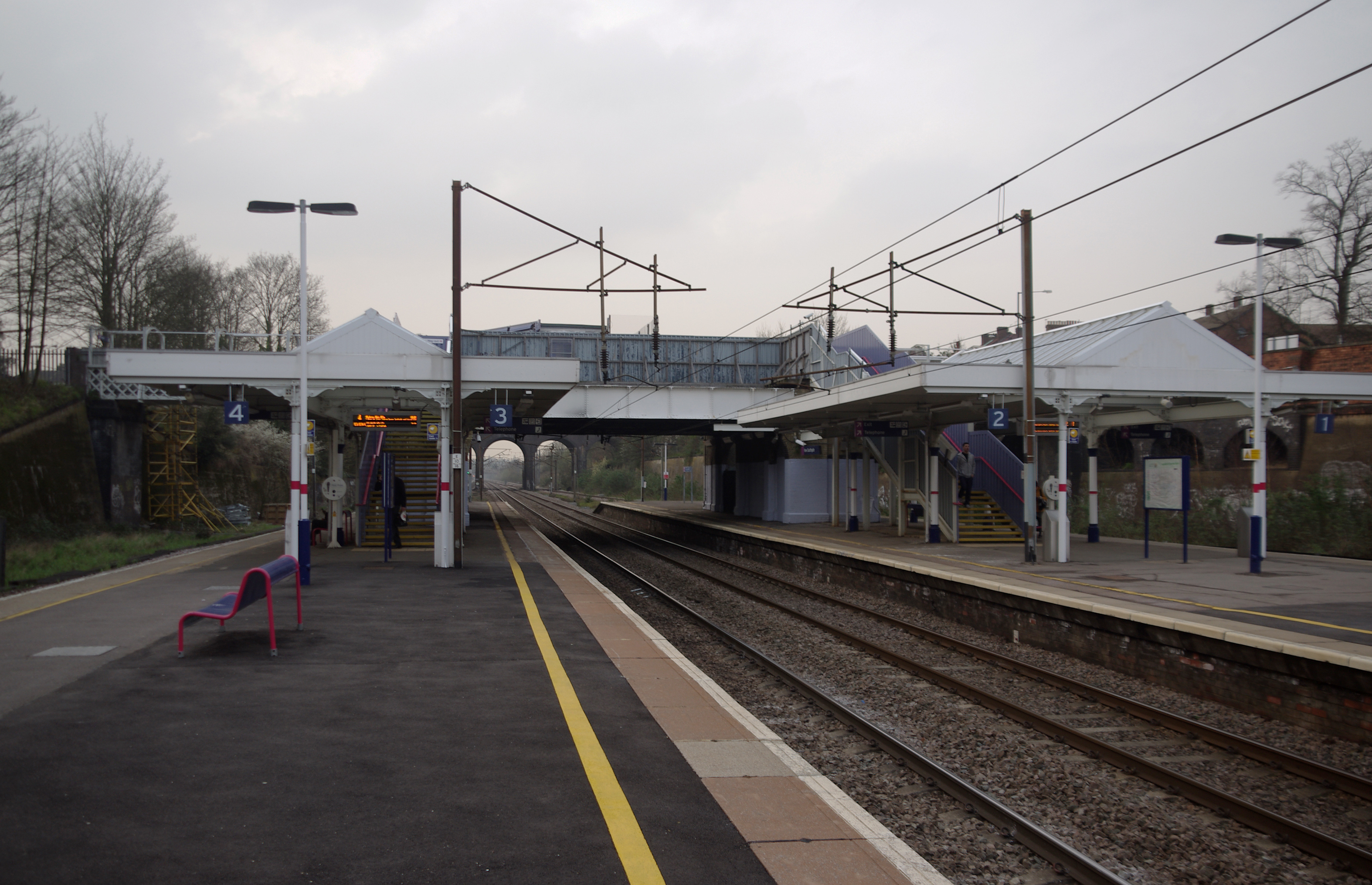
- Interactive map of New Southgate

General information
- Location: New Southgate
- Local authority: London Borough of Enfield
- Managed by: Great Northern
- Station code: NSG
- DfT category: E
- Number of platforms: 4
- Fare zone: 4

National Rail annual entry and exit
- 2020–21: ▼0.212 million
- 2021–22: ▲0.464 million
- 2022–23: ▲0.697 million
- 2023–24: ▲0.809 million
- 2024–25: ▲0.920 million

Other information
- External links: Departures; Facilities
- Coordinates: 51.6142°N 0.1432°W

New Southgate railway station is on the boundary of the London Borough of Barnet and the London Borough of Enfield in north London, in London fare zone 4. It is 6 miles 35 chains (10.4 km) down the line from London King's Cross.

The station, and all trains serving it, have been operated by Great Northern since 14 September 2014.

== Location ==
The station is administered by the London Borough of Enfield, although the boundary with the London Borough of Barnet runs through the station, rather than along one side. The station has exits into both boroughs.

== History ==
=== Building of the station ===
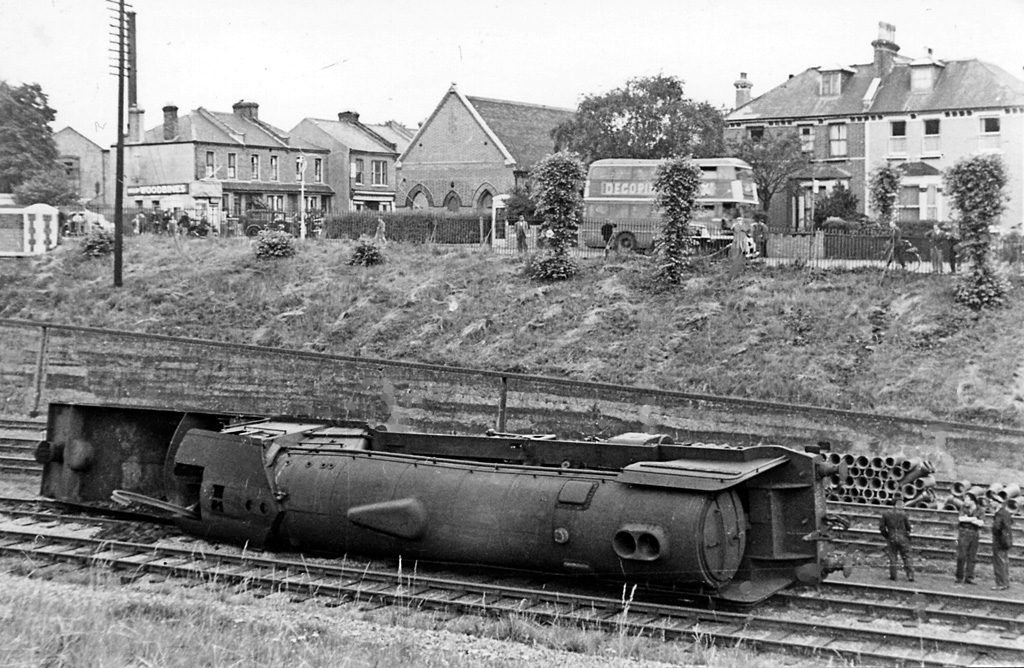
Derailment just north of New Southgate in 1948

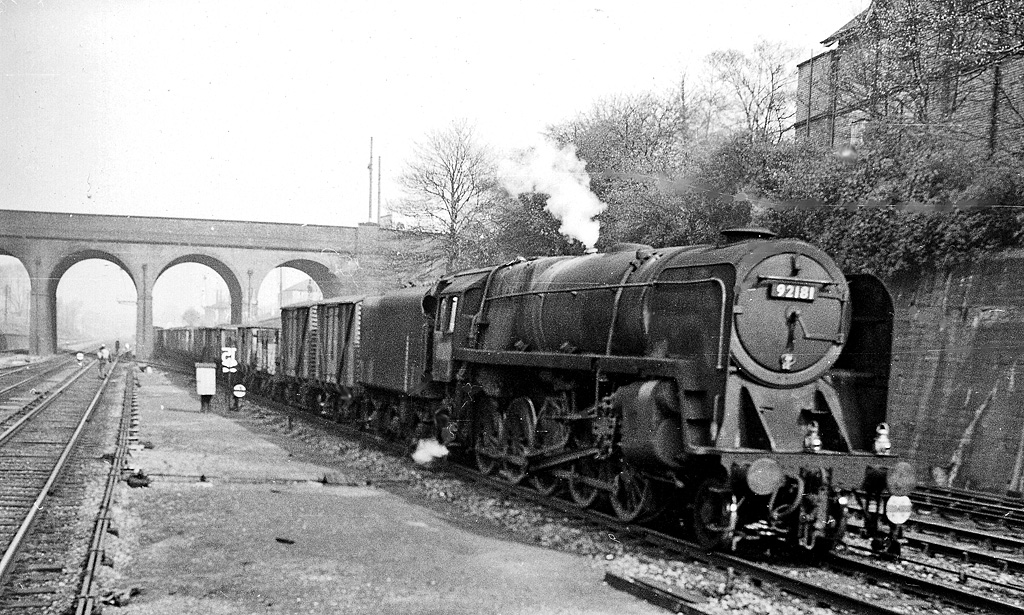
Up ECML mineral at New Southgate in 1962

The station opened by order of the Middlesex Justices (see Middlesex Guildhall), on 7 August 1850 as Colney Hatch & Southgate station or Colney Hatch station by the Great Northern Railway (GNR). The Justices insisted on trains stopping daily for the benefit of the Second Middlesex County Asylum opened that year at Colney Hatch, which became Friern Hospital and closed in 1993. The original booking office, which sat on a bridge across the railway lines, burned down in 1976 and was replaced by a portakabin.

=== Service patterns ===
The station was built next to the asylum, with a siding which connected by a tramway to the stores depot in the grounds. There was one train hourly to Hatfield in the north and to Hornsey and King's Cross in the south in 1860, when the journey to King's Cross took 18 minutes. Trains, as before, ran hourly in 1975.

=== Renamings ===
The name of the station has changed five times: to Southgate and Colney Hatch on 1 February 1855; to New Southgate and Colney Hatch on 1 October 1876; to New Southgate for Colney Hatch on 1 March 1883; to New Southgate and Friern Barnet on 1 May 1923; and finally to New Southgate on 18 March 1971,

=== Operators ===
The GNR came under the London and North Eastern Railway (LNER) after "Grouping" in 1923, before British Railways took over upon nationalisation in 1948. WAGN (an acronym of West Anglia, Great Northern) operated the service from 1997 to 2006.

=== Ticketing ===
In autumn 2008, a self-service ticket machine widening payment methods to accept cash and debit/credit cards, was installed at the eastern street-level entrance.

== Services ==
Off-peak, all services at New Southgate are operated by Great Northern using Class 717 EMUs.

The typical off-peak service in trains per hour is:

- 2 tph to Moorgate
- 2 tph to Welwyn Garden City

Additional services, including a number of Thameslink operated services to and from Sevenoaks via Catford call at the station during the peak hours.

Preceding station	National Rail	Following station
Alexandra Palace	Great Northern Great Northern Route Stopping Services	Oakleigh Park
Finsbury Park	Thameslink Thameslink Peak Hours Only	Oakleigh Park

== Connections ==
London Buses routes 221, 232, 382, SL1 and night route N91 serve the station.
