= List of schools in the London Borough of Barnet =

This is a list of schools in the London Borough of Barnet, England.

== State-funded schools ==
=== Primary schools ===
Source. (CE indicates Church of England, RC Roman Catholic schools, J Jewish).

- Akiva School (J)
- All Saints' Primary School (Childs Hill) (CE)
- All Saints' Primary School (Whetstone) (CE)
- Alma Primary School (J)
- The Annunciation Infant School (RC)
- The Annunciation Junior School (RC)
- Ashmole Primary School
- Barnfield Primary School
- Beis Yaakov Primary School (J)
- Beit Shvidler Primary School (J)
- Bell Lane Primary School
- Blessed Dominic Primary School (RC)
- Broadfields Primary School
- Brookland Infant School
- Brookland Junior School
- Brunswick Park Primary School
- Chalgrove Primary School
- Childs Hill Primary School
- Christ Church Primary School (CE)
- Church Hill School
- Claremont Primary School
- Colindale Primary School
- Coppetts Wood Primary School
- Courtland School
- Cromer Road Primary School
- Danegrove Primary School
- Deansbrook Infant School
- Deansbrook Junior School
- Dollis Primary School
- Edgware Primary School
- Etz Chaim Primary School (J)
- Fairway Primary School
- Foulds School
- Frith Manor Primary School
- Garden Suburb Infant School
- Garden Suburb Junior School
- Goldbeaters Primary School
- Grasvenor Avenue Infant School
- Hasmonean Primary School (J)
- Hollickwood Primary School
- Holly Park Primary School
- Holy Trinity Primary School (CE)
- The Hyde School
- Independent Jewish Day School (J)
- Livingstone Primary School
- London Academy
- Manorside Primary School
- Martin Primary School
- Mathilda Marks-Kennedy Primary School (J)
- Menorah Foundation School (J)
- Menorah Primary School (J)
- Millbrook Park Primary School (CE)
- Monken Hadley School (CE)
- Monkfrith Primary School
- Moss Hall Infant School
- Moss Hall Junior School
- Nancy Reuben Primary School
- The Noam Primary School
- Northside Primary School
- The Orion Primary School
- Osidge Primary School
- Our Lady of Lourdes School (RC)
- Pardes House Primary School (J)
- Parkfield Primary School
- Queenswell Infant School
- Queenswell Junior School
- Rimon Primary School (J)
- Rosh Pinah Primary School (J)
- Sacks Morasha Primary School (J)
- Sacred Heart Primary School (RC)
- St Agnes' Primary School (RC)
- St Andrew's Primary School (CE)
- St Catherine's Primary School (RC)
- St John's Primary School (Friern Barnet) (CE)
- St John's Primary School (Whetstone) (CE)
- St Joseph's Primary School (RC)
- St Mary's & St John's School (CE)
- St Mary's Primary School (East Barnet) (CE)
- St Mary's Primary School (Finchley) (CE)
- St Paul's Primary School (Friern Barnet) (CE)
- St Paul's Primary School (Mill Hill) (CE)
- St Theresa's Primary School (RC)
- St Vincent's Primary School (RC)
- Shalom Noam Primary School
- Summerside Primary School
- Sunnyfields Primary School
- Trent Primary School (CE)
- Tudor Primary School
- Underhill School
- Watling Park School
- Wessex Gardens Primary School
- Whitings Hill Primary School
- Woodcroft Primary School
- Woodridge Primary School
- Wren Academy (CE)

=== Secondary schools ===
- The Archer Academy
- Ark Pioneer Academy
- Ashmole Academy
- Bishop Douglass Catholic School
- Christ's College
- The Compton School
- Copthall School
- East Barnet School
- Finchley Catholic High School North Finchley
- Friern Barnet School
- Hasmonean High School (Jewish)
- Hendon School
- Jewish Community Secondary School (Jewish)
- London Academy
- Menorah High School For Girls
- Mill Hill County High School
- Queen Elizabeth's School for Girls
- St Andrew the Apostle Greek Orthodox School
- St James' Catholic High School
- St Mary's and St John's CE School
- Saracens High School
- The Totteridge Academy
- Whitefield School
- Wren Academy

=== Grammar schools ===
- Henrietta Barnett School
- Queen Elizabeth's School
- St Michael's Catholic Grammar School

=== Special and alternative schools ===
- Kisharon School
- Mapledown School
- Northgate School
- Northway School
- Oak Hill School
- Oak Lodge School
- Oakleigh School
- Pavilion Study Centre
- The Windmill School

=== Further education ===
- Barnet and Southgate College
- Imperial College London Mathematics School
- Woodhouse College

== Independent schools ==
=== Primary and preparatory schools ===
- Annemount School
- Ateres Beis Yaakov Primary School
- Beis Soroh Schneirer
- Edgware Jewish Girls - Beis Chinuch
- Finchley and Acton Yochien School
- Goodwyn School
- Hendon Preparatory School
- Holland House School
- Kerem School
- Lyonsdown School
- Peninim
- St Anthony's School for Girls
- St Martin's Nursery and Preparatory School
- Tashbar of Edgware
- Torah Vodaas

=== Senior and all-through schools ===
- Barnet Hill Academy
- Beis Medrash Elyon
- Beth Jacob Grammar School for Girls
- Brampton College
- Dwight School London
- King Alfred School
- Lubavitch Senior Boys School
- Lubavitch Yeshiva Ketanah of London
- Menorah Grammar School
- Mill Hill School
- Mount House School
- North London Grammar School
- Pardes House Grammar School
- Shiras Devorah High School
- Susi Earnshaw Theatre School
- Talmud Torah Tiferes Shlomoh
- Tiferes High School
- Unity Girls High School
- Wentworth College

=== Special and alternative schools ===
- Ellern Mede School
- The Holmewood School
- Woodside School
