= Friern Barnet =

Suburb of London

Coordinates: 51.6126°N 0.1584°W

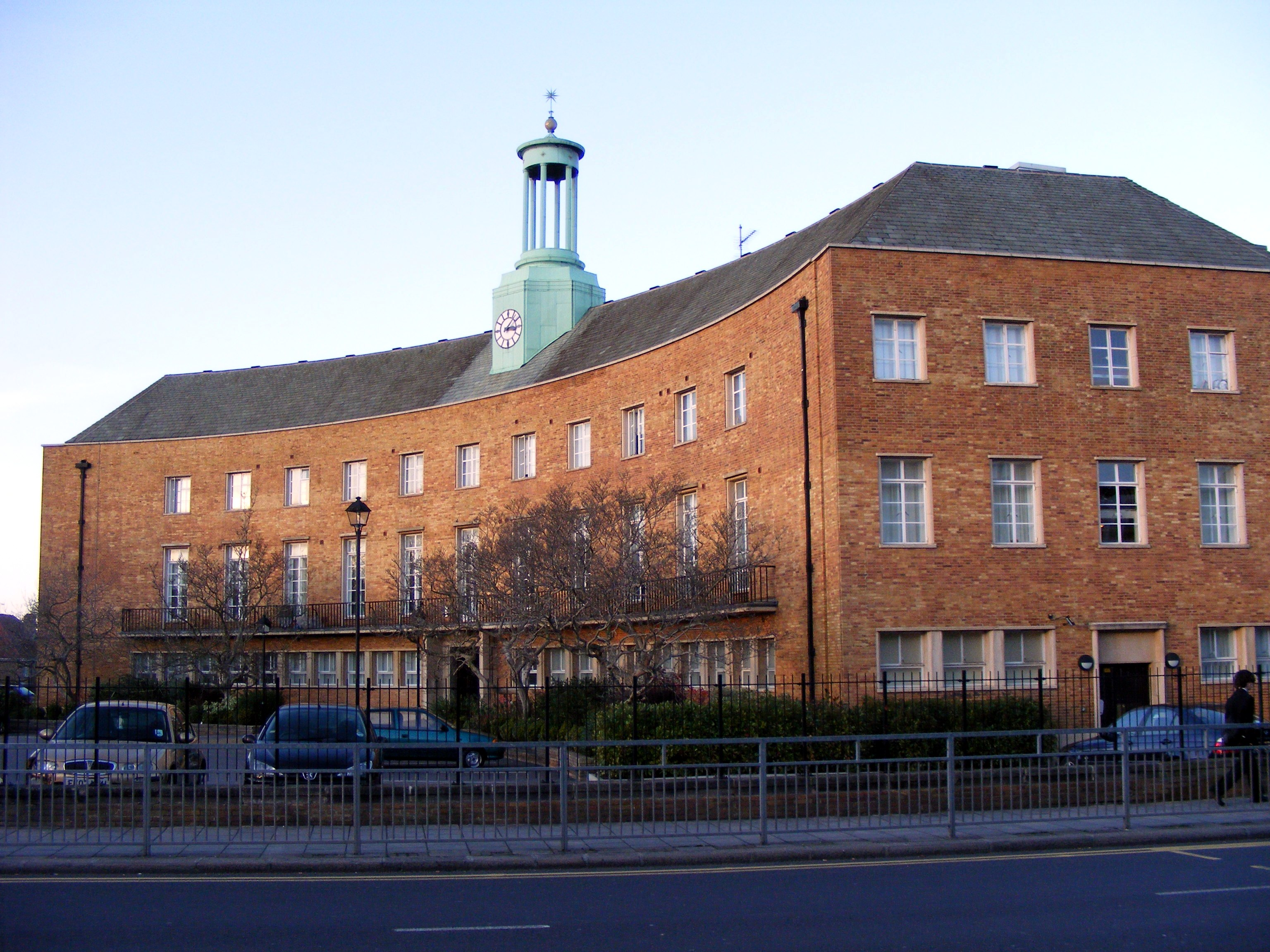
- Friern Barnet Town Hall

- Location within Greater London
- Population: 17,250 Coppetts ward (2011 census)
- OS grid reference: TQ276920
- London borough: Barnet
- Ceremonial county: Greater London
- Region: London
- Country: England
- Sovereign state: United Kingdom
- Post town: LONDON
- Postcode district: N10, N11, N12, N20
- Dialling code: 020
- Police: Metropolitan
- Fire: London
- Ambulance: London
- UK Parliament: Hornsey and Friern Barnet
- London Assembly: Barnet and Camden

Friern Barnet (/ˌfraɪərn ˈbɑːrnɪt/) is a suburban area within the London Borough of Barnet, 7.4 miles (11.9 km) north of Charing Cross. Its centre is formed by the busy intersection of Colney Hatch Lane (running north and south), Woodhouse Road (taking westbound traffic towards North Finchley) and Friern Barnet Road (leading east towards New Southgate).

== History ==
Friern Barnet (parish) population
1881	6,424
1891	9,173
1901	11,566
1911	14,924
1921	17,375
1931	23,101
1941	war #
1951	29,163
1961	28,813
# no census was held due to war
source: UK census

Friern Barnet was an ancient parish in the Finsbury division of Ossulstone hundred, in the county of Middlesex.

Friern Barnet within Middlesex in 1961

The area was originally considered to be part of Barnet, most of which was in Hertfordshire. By the 13th century the Middlesex section of Barnet was known as Little Barnet, before becoming Frerenbarnet and then Friern Barnet (sometimes spelt in other ways, such as "Fryern Barnett"). The "Friern" part of the parish's name derives from the French for "brother" and refers to the medieval lordship of the Brotherhood or Knights of the Hospital of St John of Jerusalem.

Friern Barnet was mainly rural until the 19th century. The opening of Colney Hatch paupers' lunatic asylum in 1851, and of railway stations on the Great Northern and Metropolitan Railways, also in the mid-19th century, prompted its development as an outer London suburb. This process was accelerated by the arrival of electric trams in the 1900s.

Local affairs were administered by the parish vestry until 1875, when it was grouped with neighbouring parishes as part of Barnet Rural Sanitary District. In response to a petition by local ratepayers who wished the area to be removed from the Barnet RSD, the parish adopted the Local Government Act 1858 and formed a local board of health of nine members in 1883. Under the Local Government Act 1894 the local board's area became the Friern Barnet Urban District. This occupied an area of 1,304 acres (5.28 km^{2}) in 1911 and had a population of 14,924. In 1961 it occupied an area of 1,342 acres (5.43 km^{2}) and the population was 28,813. In 1965 it became part of the London Borough of Barnet.

=== Notable people ===
In order of birth:

- Lawrence Campe (died 1613), draper and citizen of the City of London, funded the building of almshouses in "Fryan Barnett".
- Charlotte Maria Tucker (1821–1893), pseudonym A.L.O.E. (A Lady of England), was born at Friern Hatch. She was a prolific writer and poet for children and adults, who tempered her didactic Evangelicalism with realistic depictions of the poor.
- Wilfred Kitching (1893–1977), 7th General of the Salvation Army, was educated at Friern Barnet Grammar School.
- Dorothy Lawrence (1896–1964), a reporter who posed as a man to join the army in World War I, was later confined in Colney Hatch Lunatic Asylum (latterly Friern Hospital), where she died.
- Jack Cohen, founder of the Tesco retail chain, funded with his wife the Jewish care facility Lady Sarah Cohen House in Friern Barnet.
- Hazel Alden Reason (1901–1976), chemist and popular science writer, was born in Friern Barnet.
- H. G. H. Kearns (1902–1986), an entomologist with a strong knowledge of engineering, was born in Friern Barnet.
- Cyril Fletcher (1913–2005), comedian and actor, was educated at Woodhouse Grammar School.
- Colin Pearson (1923–2007), a studio potter and art teacher, was born in Friern Barnet.
- Edgar Mann (1926–2013), a politician who chaired the Executive Council of the Isle of Man and then headed its government, was educated at Woodhouse Barnet Grammar School.
- John Williams (born 1941), classical guitarist, was educated at Friern Barnet Grammar School
- Václav Jelínek (born 1944), Czech spy who was arrested in his flat in Friern Barnet on 22 April 1988, while in the process of receiving coded messages by radio.
- Neil 'Roberto' Williams (born 1978), a radio and TV presenter, was educated at Friern Barnet Grammar School.
- Girls Aloud, pop group, resided at Princess Park Manor.

== Housing ==
The housing typically consists of late Victorian and early Edwardian properties, along with other large houses of later periods and many smaller semi-detached and terraced houses. Princess Park Manor is a luxury redevelopment of the Victorian era Colney Hatch Lunatic Asylum (later Friern Hospital). Adjacent to Princess Park Manor is a modern housing development called Friern Village.

== Parks and open spaces ==
Friern Barnet is a leafy suburb of private gardens and trees and Friary Park. The area includes the North Middlesex Golf Club, whose main entrance is at the Whetstone end of Friern Barnet Lane, and Coppetts Wood nature reserve, a medium-sized green area of rare plants and wildlife including some types of small bat and Great Crested Newts.

== Architecture ==
The Church of England parish church of St John The Evangelist in Friern Barnet Road is Grade II* listed.

Friern Barnet Town Hall in Friern Barnet Lane was built in 1939–41 to a design by Sir John Brown and A. E. Henson. The design owes much to that of Watford Town Hall, whose architect (Charles Cowles-Voysey) had played a pivotal role in judging the design competition. English Heritage lists it as "a good example of pared-down modernism... [whose] subtle form and pronounced sense of civic pride mark it out as an exceptional civic building, on this scale, of its day."

== Education ==
Local schools and colleges include Coppetts Wood Primary School, Friern Barnet School, Dwight School London (being the former Friern Barnet Grammar School), The Compton School, Woodhouse College, St John's CE Primary School, Holly Park Primary School and the Wren Academy.

== Politics and government ==
Friern Barnet is covered by the Hornsey and Friern Barnet constituency for elections to the House of Commons.

Friern Barnet is covered by the Friern Barnet ward for elections to Barnet London Borough Council.

== Transport ==
The North Circular Road bisects the southern part. The nearest London Underground stations are Arnos Grove, Woodside Park and Finchley Central. The nearest National Rail station is New Southgate. The area is served by London Buses routes 34, 43, 134, 221, 232, 234, 382, 634, 683 and SL1.

== Local newspapers ==
The local newspapers are as of 2011:

Newspaper	Ref.
The Barnet and Potters Bar Times	
Barnet Today	
Potters Bar Today	

== See also ==
- Friern Barnet & District Local History Society
