= Sydney Simmons =

English entrepreneur and philanthropist

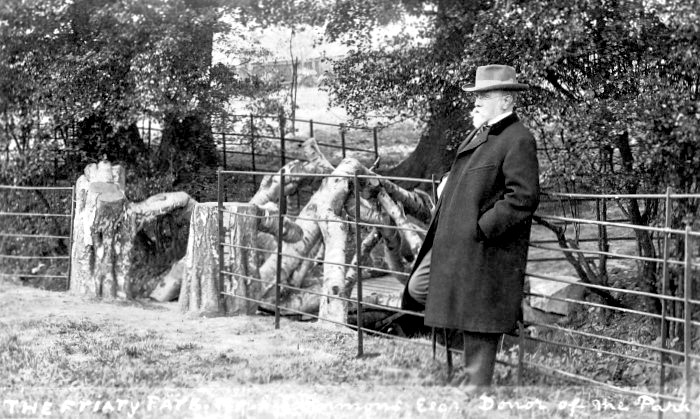
- Simmons in Friary Park, Barnet.
- Born: 10 September 1840; Okehampton, Devon, England
- Died: 29 April 1924 (aged 83)
- Occupation: Business owner
- Known for: Philanthropy in Okehampton and Barnet
- Spouse: Annie Simmons

Sydney Simmons (10 September 1840 – 29 April 1924) was an English entrepreneur and philanthropist in Okehampton, Devon, and Friern Barnet, Middlesex (now London). Born in Devon, he was first apprenticed to a drapery company before travelling to London in 1862 where he became the North American representative of a carpet company. He acquired the rights to a new carpet cleaning process, the exploitation of which in Britain made him wealthy. He lived in Friern Barnet and funded a number of philanthropic projects there and in his native Okehampton where he was buried.

== Early life and family ==
Sydney Simmons was born in Okehampton, Devon, on 10 September 1840, the youngest son of Thomas and Elizabeth Simmons. His father ran a printing business which the family continued after he died in 1851. Sydney then went to Devonport in Plymouth where he was apprenticed to a drapery firm for ten years.

He married Annie who died in 1936.

== Career ==
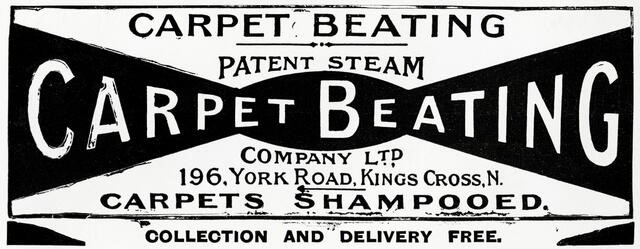
Advert for the Patent Steam Carpet Beating Company

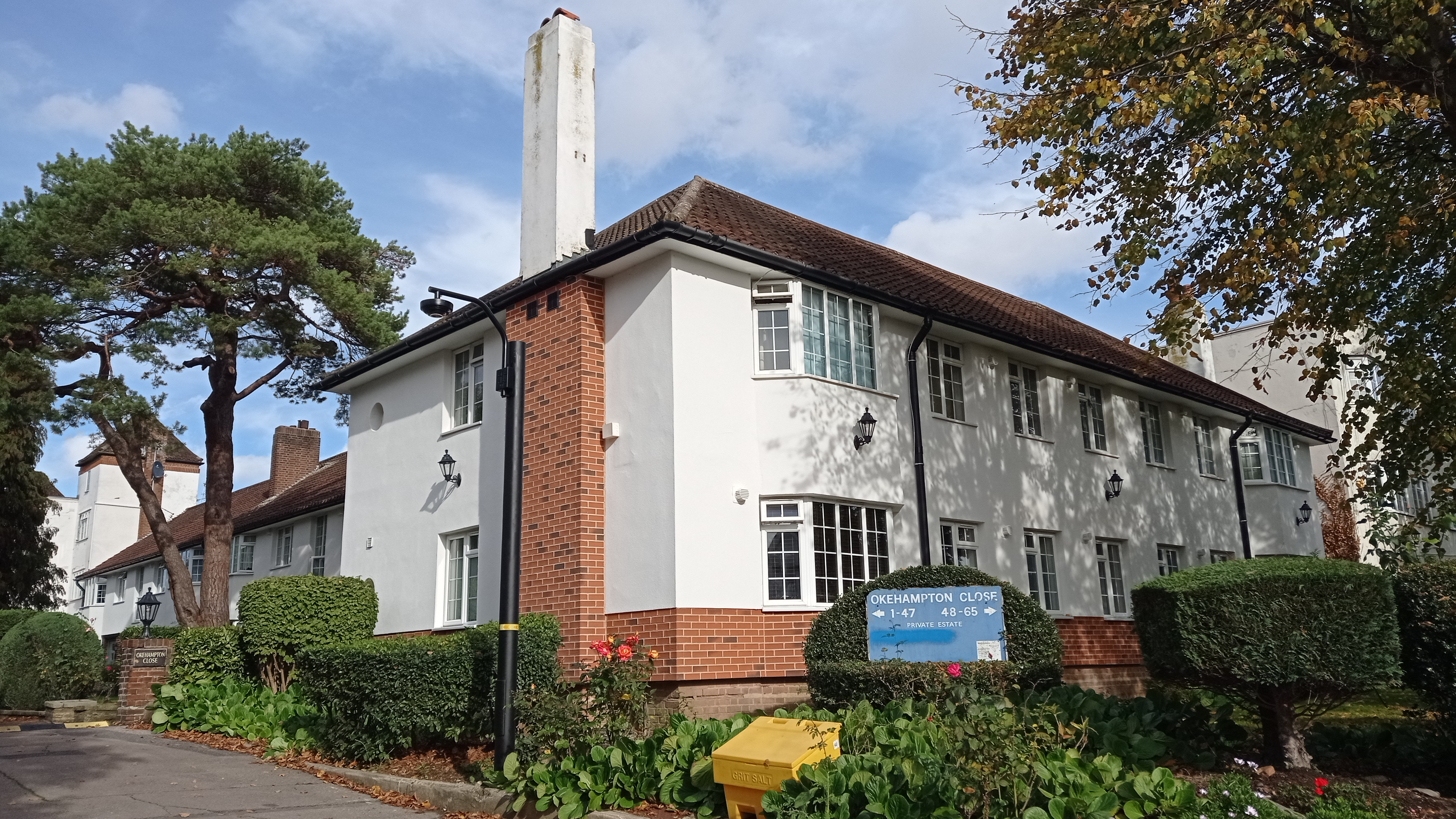
Okehampton Close, North Finchley

In 1862, Simmons travelled to London to work for a firm that made carpets. There he also joined the Queen's Westminsters volunteers and qualified as a marksman. In 1862, he travelled to North America as a sales representative for the carpet company, spending a decade travelling across the continent. In 1888, he returned to London with the rights to a new process for cleaning carpets. He formed The Patent Steam Carpet Beating Company and The Compressed Air Carpet and Tapestry Cleaning Company and through them became a wealthy man.

Simmons bought a house in Friern Park, North Finchley, that he named Okehampton. The house was demolished after his death and a development of flats in the garden city movement style built on the site in the 1930s that is known as Okehampton Close. When sold on behalf of the Foyle Foundation in 2018, the development comprised 65 flats and 30 garages over 2.63 acres.

He was a justice of the peace.

== Philanthropy ==
Simmons bought the land for Simmons Park in Okehampton from the local council and paid for the park to be laid out. He then gave it to the local people in perpetuity.

In 1909, Simmons provided £7,500 towards the costs of £7,796 to allow Friern Barnet Urban District Council to buy the Friary Estate in Friern Barnet, Middlesex, now Friary Park, on condition that it remain a public park in perpetuity. He refused to pay the legal fees for the purchase.

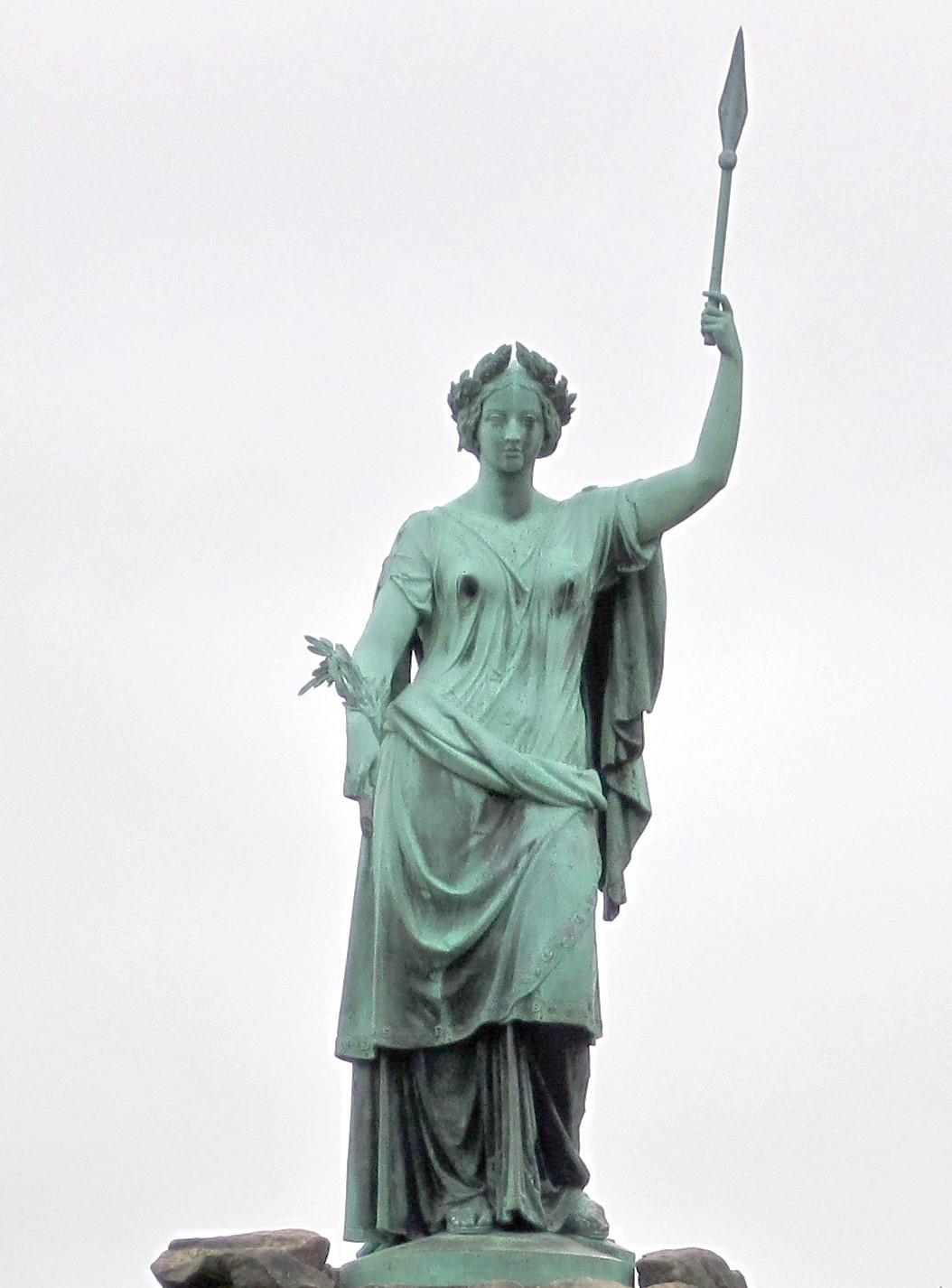
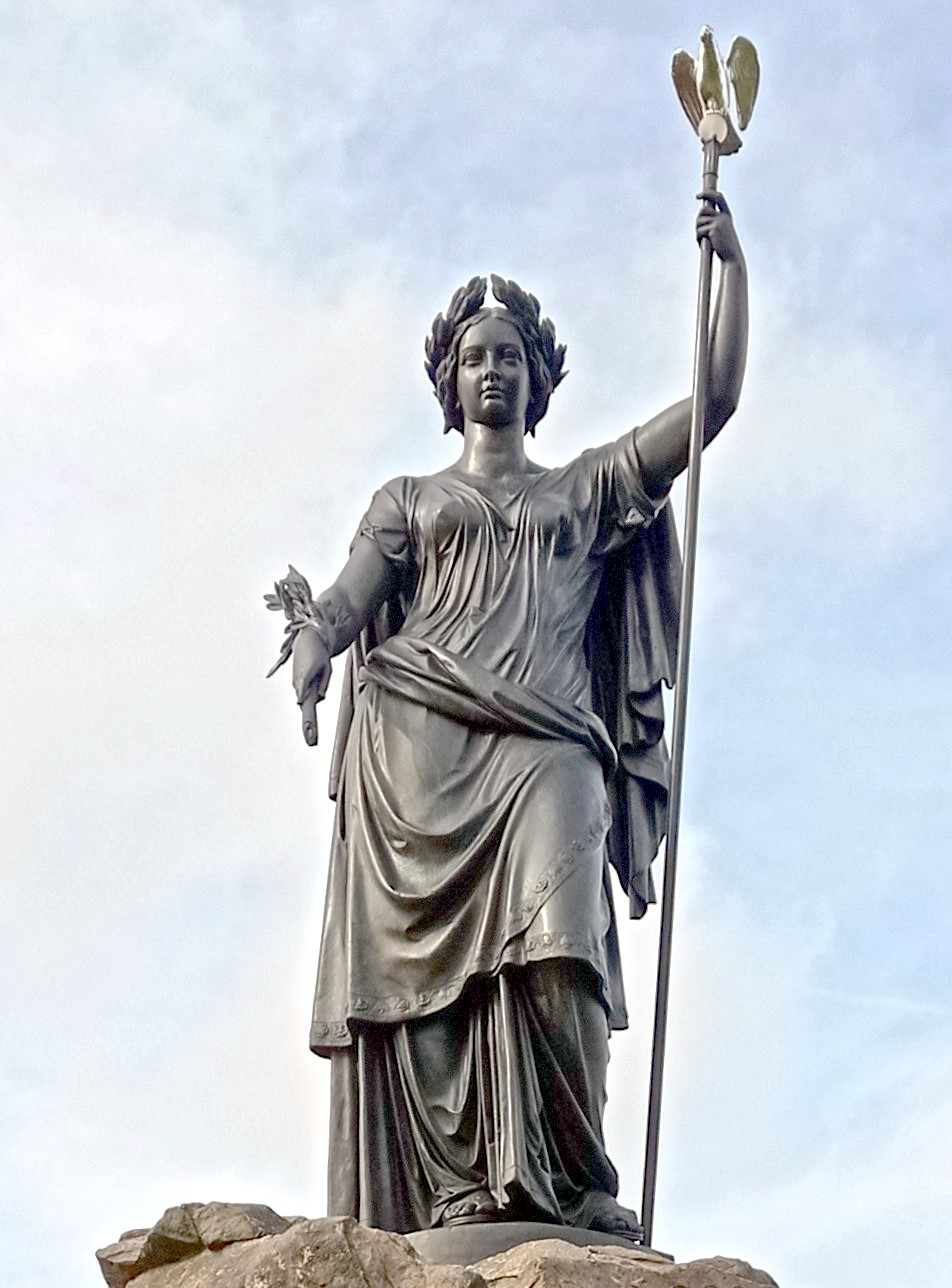
Queen Victoria Peace statue in Friary Park with spear (left) and reinstated dove (right).

In 1911 he bought the ruin of Okehampton Castle and its medieval deer park and then renovated the remains and site with new paths and seating for visitors. He gave the castle to the people of Okehampton in 1917 and endowed a fund with £1,000 in consols to provide for its maintenance.

He purchased and paid for the erection in Friary Park in May 1911 of a statue of Queen Victoria as Peace that was grade II listed by Historic England in 1983. It bears a dedication dated 7 May 1910 to the memory of Edward VII who died on 6 May 1910. It stands on 200 tons of rock from Devon, shaped in the form of a tor. The statue originally had Victoria holding a dove but at some time that was changed to a spear. The statue was restored by Barnet Council in 2022 and the dove reinstated.

Simmons proposed the idea of the Friary Park Bowling Club in 1911 and in 1922 paid for a bowling green in Okehampton. A keen golfer, he gave the land for Okehampton Golf Course (opened 1913) and in 1921 donated £500 for the laying-out of the recreation grounds at Kempley Meadows in Okehampton, including a bowling green, on condition that the work was done by the unemployed of the town.

== Death and legacy ==
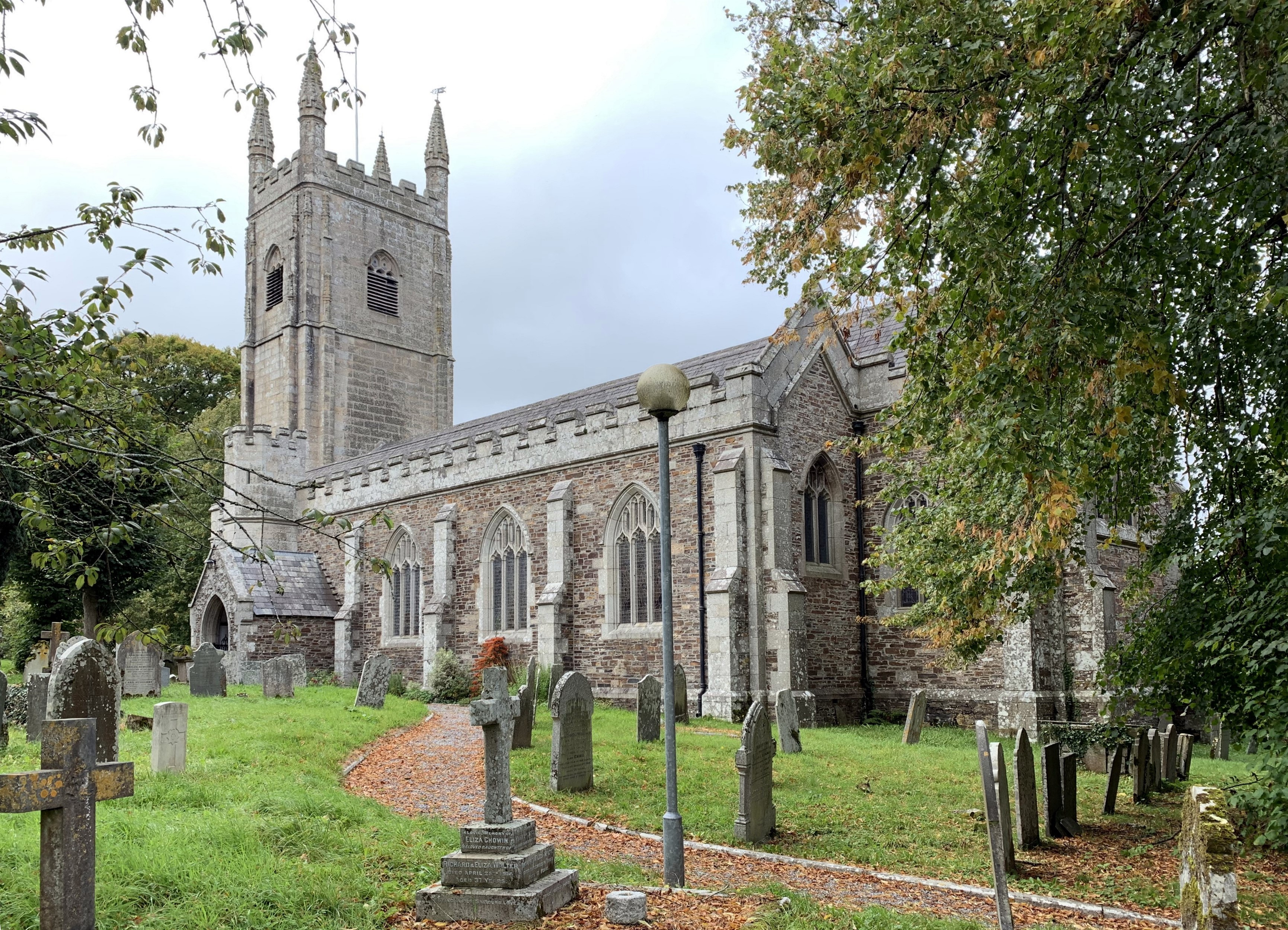
All Saints' Church, Okehampton

Simmons died on 29 April 1924 at the age of 83. He received an obituary in The Western Morning News and is buried in the churchyard of All Saints in Okehampton. Probate was granted to his wife Annie, James Piper gentleman, Brendon Ball Newcombe retired army major, and Wallace Rice Harvey company secretary, in the amount of £155,015 (equivalent to £8,148,149 in 2025). He is remembered in Simmons Way on the Russell Lane housing estate in Oakleigh Park, Barnet, which was built in the early 1920s.

== See also ==
- John Miles
