= Friern Barnet School =

Coordinates: 51°36′59.13″N 0°9′17.26″W

Friern Barnet School.

Location
- Hemington Avenue; Friern Barnet, North London, N11 3LS; England

Information
- Type: Comprehensive Community School
- Motto: Enjoy and Excel
- Established: 1961
- Local authority: Barnet
- Department for Education URN: 101345 Tables
- Ofsted: Reports
- Headteacher: Simon Horne
- Gender: Mixed
- Age: 11 to 16
- Enrolment: 787
- Capacity: 815
- Houses: Aldwych, Barbican, Cottesloe, Dominion, Empire and Forum
- Website: http://www.friern.barnet.sch.uk/

Friern Barnet School (FBS) is a comprehensive school with approximately 800 students. The school is situated at the end of Hemington Avenue (a cul-de-sac) in Friern Barnet, North London. It is a short distance from the former Friern Barnet Town Hall (now converted to flats), and 2 other local schools The Compton School and Wren Academy.

== History ==
The school site was built in 1960-1 and was opened in 1961 as Friern Barnet County School, with 500 pupils who had transferred from Holly Park School.

== Overview ==
=== Specialism ===
The school became a Specialist Arts College in Performing Arts in September 2004 and has twice received the Artsmark Gold award.

=== Infrastructure and resources ===
The arrival of Jeremy Turner as Head Teacher in September 2006 has prompted a major change in the running of the school. In March 2007 the school was named the most improved secondary school in the Borough of Barnet.

The school increased the number of forms in each year from six to eight in September 2011. This allowed the number of students per form to be reduced from 25 to 20. The school now has six houses: Aldwych, Barbican, Cottesloe, Dominion, Empire and Forum. All of the houses are named after famous Theatres to represent the school's Performing Arts values.

The school's infrastructure has also been improved, with the school buildings re-painted throughout, signs outside the school's main building, Usher building and Arts department and the playground improved with 5 outdoor Table Tennis tables, and 6 Basketball hoops. A new outdoor food court was built for the canteen, shelters in place of the green slopes outside the art room, an anti bullying shelter and a professional dance floor was added to the school gymnasium. Barnet Youth Council funded a new beauty therapy suite, which are used by Key-Stage 4 GCSE students.

Robots and updated computer systems have been added to the technology building for Key-Stage 3 lessons. The school library (now known as the LRC: Learning Resource Centre) has been updated with similar computer systems and a new catalogue of books.

At the beginning of the 2009/2010 academic year, further improvements were made to the school canteen. The kitchens were replaced with a self-service bar, and a dance floor was installed, similar to that in the school hall.

=== Student Parliament ===
The school's Student Parliament also has developed a strong voice representing students within the school. They are a key part of the running of the school, and ensure that the voice of students is put across and heard, and this was something that was noted by Ofsted in the 2011 Inspection. The Student Parliament is led by a single male student in Year 11, supported by the Student Leadership Team, members of which were appointed by the previous Head Students, Assistant Headteacher, and the Headteacher in June 2012.

=== Performing Arts ===
The Performing Arts Faculty at Friern Barnet regularly produces outstanding whole school productions. Including 'Little Shop of Horrors' (February 2011), 'Grease' (December 2011), 'Oliver!' (December 2012), 'Hairspray' (December 2013) and the new production of 'Bugsy Malone' which was held in December 2014.

The schools Glee Club entitled 'FBS FUSION' also won the Jack Petchy Glee Club challenge competition in November 2011. It involved schools across the country, with knock out stages and a Grand Final held at the Savoy Theatre in London. The competition final was judged by TV Presenter Graham Norton and Actress Tamzin Outhwaite.

=== Sixth form ===
The school has a partnership with Woodhouse College which acts as the sixth form provision. The school also has links with Barnet College.
