= Friern Barnet Grammar School =

School in north London

Information
- Former name: St John's High School for Boys
- School type: Private Boys' School
- Established: 1884
- Closed: 1995

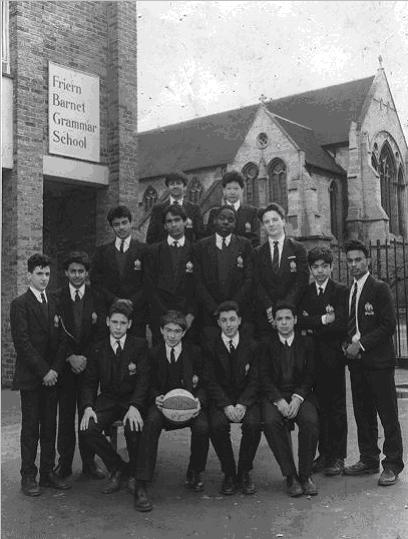
Boys at The Friern Barnet Grammar School, Friern Barnet Road, London

The Friern Barnet Grammar School was a small private day school for boys located on Friern Barnet Road, North London.

It was later absorbed into the co-educational Woodside Park School foundation which was later renamed The North London International School and is today known as The Dwight School London, notably one of the first schools to offer the International Baccalaureate as an alternative to traditional British A-Level studies.

== History ==
The school was founded in 1884 as St John's High School for Boys by the Reverend Prebendary Frederick Hall MA of Jesus College, Cambridge, rector of the Parish of St James and St John, Friern Barnet, to educate boys from middle-class families capable of meeting fee payments, as distinct from his efforts to provide the free schooling – financially supported by parishioners – of infants.

The rector was also the founder of the Friern Barnet Grammar School for Girls (c. 1891) and commissioned the imposing St John's church building opposite the boys' school. This was a late work in the Gothic Revival style by eminent architect John Loughborough Pearson (whose works include Truro Cathedral and St John's Cathedral, Brisbane) begun in 1890 and completed by his son Frank in 1911. Reverend Hall had been curate at Pearson's St. Augustine's, Kilburn.

On the site of the school was the original temporary iron construction known as the school-church of St. John, where both classes and church services were held. This was later replaced by a one-storey building enlarged in the 1950s and the existing building, a two-storeyed block, was built in 1973.

After 1890 the establishment was known as Friern Barnet Grammar School for Boys having its own preparatory school from 1904. However the school was never populated by more than two hundred pupils.

The school's charitable arm was the subsidiary group, Friends of Friern Barnet Grammar School. In 1995, Friern Barnet Grammar became the Senior Department of Woodside Park School, rebranded and began admitting girls. Woodside Park School later became what is now Dwight School London.

Over a number of years an intense rivalry developed between pupils of the Grammar School and those from the government maintained Friern Barnet County School (latterly Friern Barnet Secondary School), which in 1961 opened nearby in Hermington Avenue.

== Information ==
Motto: Vita Lux Hominum

Latin: Life and Light of Mankind (from St John 1:4 In him was life, and the life was the light of men)

School Crest: Phoenix

School Houses: Formerly – Collingwood, Drake, Frobisher, Grenville, Nelson

Latterly – Cook (yellow), Livingstone (green), Scott (red)

Annual Events: Founder's Day, Speech Day (Prize Giving), Sports' Day

In 1961, prizes were presented by the Member of Parliament for Finchley, Mrs Margaret Thatcher who "in an inspiring address spoke to the boys about their vocation in the life of the community for which school days are a preparation".

== Headmasters ==
Headmasters:

- A B McFarlane (1885–1888)
- C D Punchard (1888–1890)
- Edward Hugh Pritchard (1890–1895)
- C E Lacy (1895–1906)
- J Ashley (1906–1908)
- Robert Ames
- Herbert Ames (1908–1941)
- Charles Secker Smith (1943–1948)
- C P F Alderson (1948–1951)
- Rev P E Thomas (1954–1960)
- Rev D Atkinson [died 2025] (1960–1964)
- Alan Heaps (1964–1981)
- John Pearman [died 2025] (1981–1995)
- Dr Peter Reynolds (Acting) (1995)
- Chris Platford (Acting) (1995)

== Notable former pupils ==
- Tasnime Akunjee (1977–) – Lawyer
- Sir (Walter) Leonard Allinson (1926–2022) – British diplomat, Oxonian (Merton College)
- Professor A(rthur) Leslie Banks (1904–1989) – Professor of Human Ecology at the University of Cambridge, 1949–71
- Chris Carter (1953–) – Founder band member Throbbing Gristle, Carter Tutti
- Lieutenant William Randolph Cooper (1897–1918) – 2nd Lieutenant, Loyal North Lancashire Regiment, WWI casualty (killed at Givenchy, 1918)
- Thomas Crosbie-Walsh (1880–1954) – Food scientist, editor Food Industries Manual & Food Manufacture, fellow of the Royal Institute of Chemistry
- Cyril Fletcher (1913–2005) – Comedian
- Peter Friese-Greene – BBC cameraman, grandson of William Friese-Greene – inventor of cinematography, son of Claude Friese-Greene – developer of the colour film process
- Colin Gottlieb (1961– ) – Chief Executive Officer, Europe, Middle East and Africa, Omnicom Media Group
- Ertan Hurer (1961–) – Conservative Councillor (Enfield), Conservative parliamentary candidate (Hackney North and Stoke Newington, 2005)
- Stefano Ispani – Chief Executive, Ponti's Group
- Alexander James Jr (b. 1925) – son of Arsenal and Scotland footballer Alex James
- Sydney James Johnstone OBE (1881–1971) – Geologist and Principal, Mineral Resources Department, Imperial Institute, fellow of the Royal Institute of Chemistry
- Barry Owen Jones (1934–) – Artist and director, Coach House Gallery, Royal Watercolour Society member
- Lord Kershaw (1906–1962) – Edward Aubrey Kershaw, 3rd Baron Kershaw of Prestwich
- General Wilfred Kitching CBE (1893–1977) – 7th General of the Salvation Army
- Dr Edgar Mann (1926–2013) – formerly Chairman of the Executive Council of the Isle of Man (Tynwald)
- Simon Nicol (1950–) – Founder band member Fairport Convention
- Dr J M R Owens (1926–) – John Owens, formerly Reader in History, Massey University, author, Oxonian (Merton College)
- His Honour Judge Pullinger – Judge John Elphick Pullinger (1930–2000), scholar of the London School of Economics and also of Lincoln's Inn, Judge Advocate General for the Near and Far East 1972–1975, Circuit Court Judge on SE Circuit 1982–1990, Croydon Law Courts 1982–2000
- Colonel Arthur Oliver Samson CBE (1888–1955) – Middle East Force
- L F Smeeton (1889–1975) – Leslie Fred Smeeton, Official Secretary, Tasmanian Government Office, London
- Michael Ugwu (1980–) – Music Producer and Businessman
- John Williams OBE (1941–) – Classical guitarist, Sky member

== Notable staff ==
- Mr F J C Gustard (1902/3–1938) who was a master at the school, Frederick Gustard – cricket journalist and statistician, contributor to Wisden, author England v. Australia. A guide to the Tests, 1934 & Somerset County Cricket. Facts and figures from 1891–1924.
- The founder, The Rev. Frederick Hall MA of Jesus College, Cambridge. Rector of Friern Barnet, Rural Dean of Hornsey and Prebendary of St Paul's. Died 1902. The author of, A Short Historical Account of the Collegiate Church of St Peter – Wolverhampton, 1865; A Simple Service Book for Children, 1866; Fasting Reception of the Blessed Sacrament: A Custom of the church Catholic, 1881.
- Headmaster A B McFarlane, Alexander Bruce McFarlane (1861–1921), latterly Headmaster, Allahabad High School, India, and Principal, Mico Training College, Kingston, Jamaica. Portrait – Alexander Bruce McFarlane (1861–1921)
- Headmaster Edward Hugh Pritchard, latterly Alderman E H Pritchard, Mayor of Fulham (1924–25).
- Headmaster Charles Deane Punchard (1861–1940), the author of Tales from Shakespeare: With Introduction and Notes by C.D. Punchard (Charles Lamb, Mary Ann Lamb, Charles Punchard, 1899), Pitman's English Grammar Revised (1911), Helps to the Study of Addison's Essays (1898), Helps to the Study of Leigh Hunt's Essays (1899), A Summary of Johnson's Milton.
- Mr W G Urry (1913–81) who was a master at the school, later Dr William G Urry, mediaeval historian and Canterbury Cathedral Archivist and Librarian (1948–1969).
