= Friary Park =

Park in Friern Barnet, London, England

Coordinates: 51.6185°N 0.1624°W

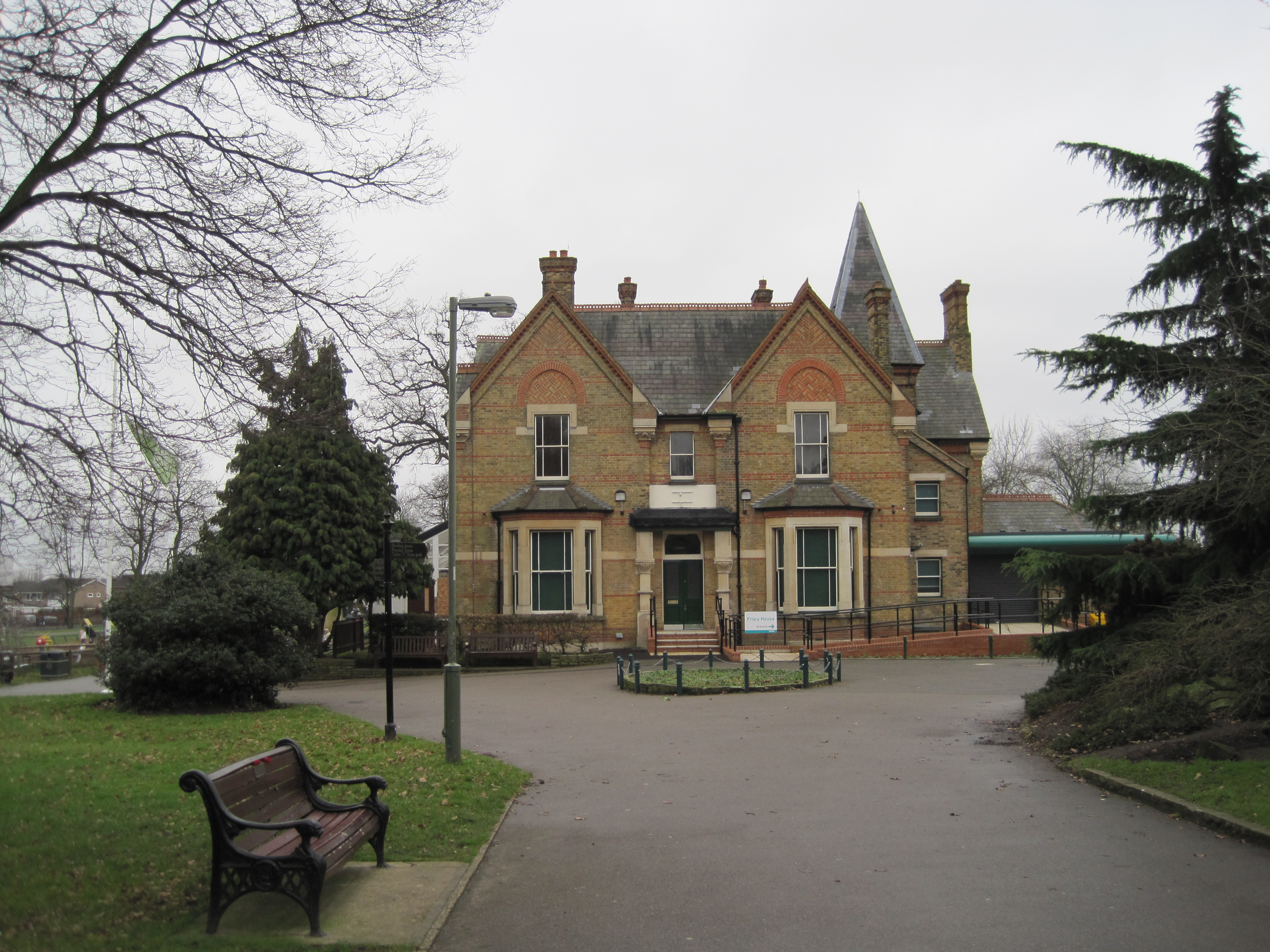
Friary House

Friary Park is a 9-hectare (22-acre) formal Edwardian park in Friern Barnet in the London Borough of Barnet. The park opened to the public in 1910, and the facilities include a cafe, playground and skatepark. It is a Site of Local Importance for Nature Conservation, and contains three redwood trees and a small stream. It is next to North Middlesex Golf Course, which contains the North Middlesex Golf Course Ponds nature reserve; this is not open to the public.

== History ==
The site was home to the Knights Hospitaller in the Middle Ages, and of Friern Barnet Manor House from the sixteenth century. The first house on the site was built by William Clark (d.1586) and rebuilt in the 18th century, before being demolished c1828. Notable residents included Sir John Popham (d. 1607), Chief Justice of the King's Bench.

The current house was built by Edmund William Richardson c1871. The name Friary Park was adopted in the 1870s and after Richardson's death, the land was acquired by Middlesex County Council, and opened to the public in 1910. In 2010 the Friends of Friary Park and other local societies organised centenary celebrations.

== Facilities ==
It is owned and managed by Barnet Council, and has a children's playground, tennis courts, a bowling green, a pitch and putt, a skatepark, outdoor gym equipment and a cafe. It is a Site of Local Importance for Nature Conservation, and has received a Green Flag Award.

The cafe is housed in the nineteenth century Gothic Revival Friary House, which is otherwise mostly unused, although Barnet Council announced in 2010 that work is underway to convert it to a base for the local police Safer Neighbourhood Team.

A prominent feature is a statue, the 'Bringer of Peace', erected by Sydney Simmons and dedicated to the memory of King Edward VII, and erected on 7 May 1910, the day after his death.

Its most interesting features ecologically are ancient oak trees, three giant redwood trees, and a small stream called Blacketts Brook, a tributary of Pymme's Brook.

There is access from Torrington Park, Friary Road and Friern Barnet Lane.

The park has an active friends group.

== North Middlesex Golf Course Ponds ==
The North Middlesex Golf Course is adjacent to the park to the north at Grid Ref TQ269 930. Blacketts Brook runs through two ponds on the golf course before entering the park. Palmate newts, which are rare in London, breed in the ponds, which are a Site of Borough Importance for Nature Conservation, Grade II. The reserve is not open to the public.

== Gallery ==
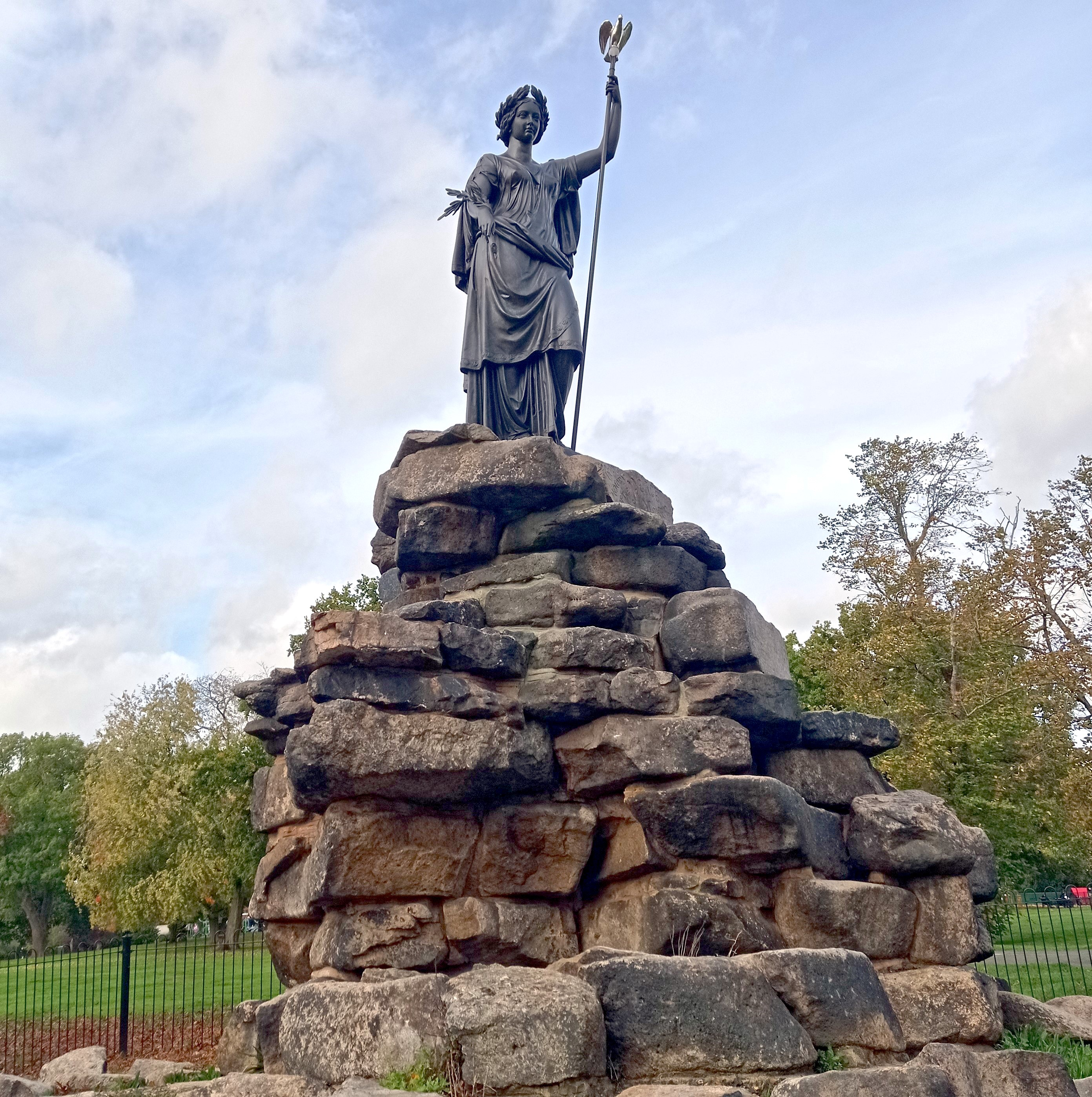
Statue of Peace

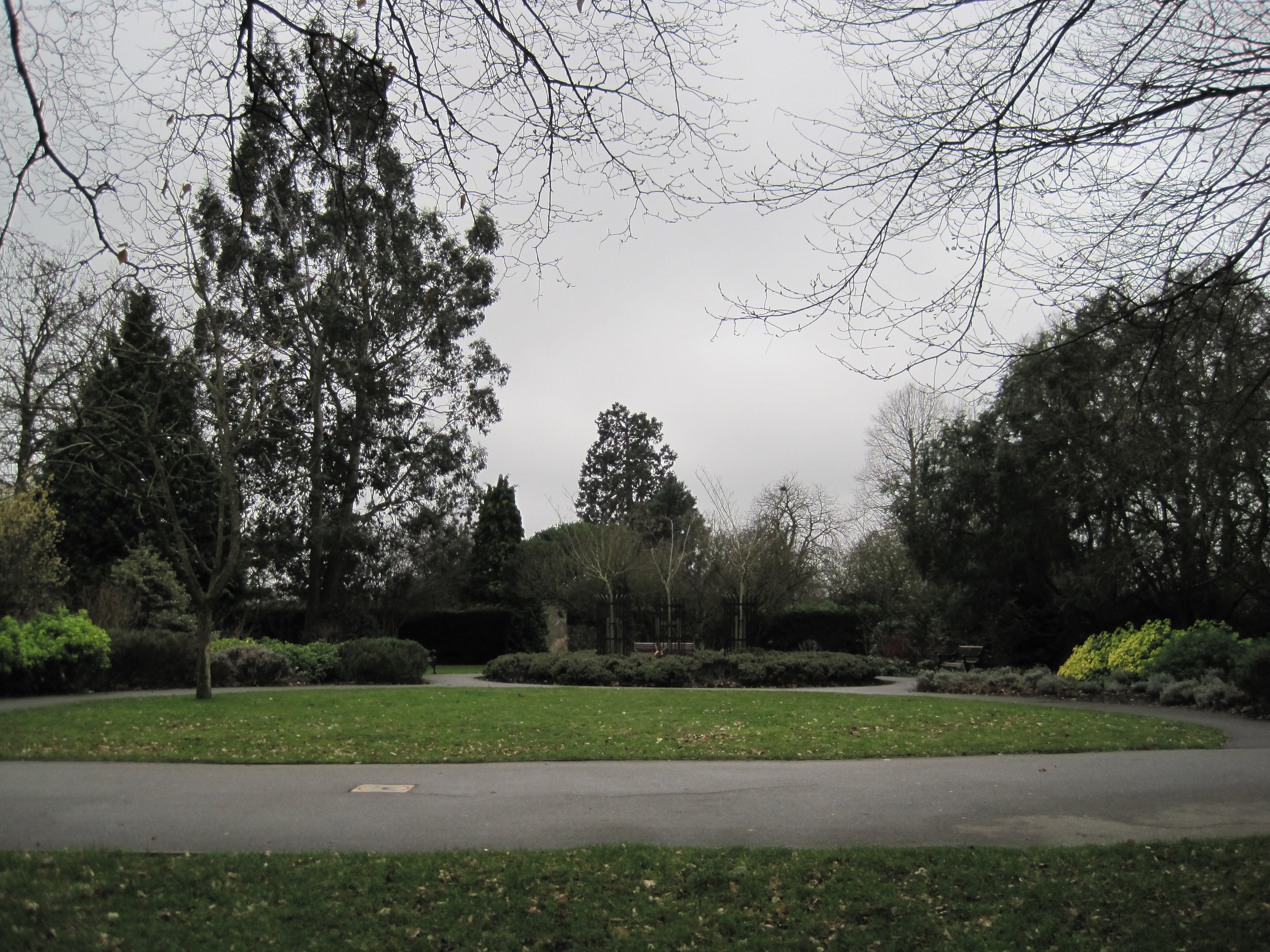
Formal garden

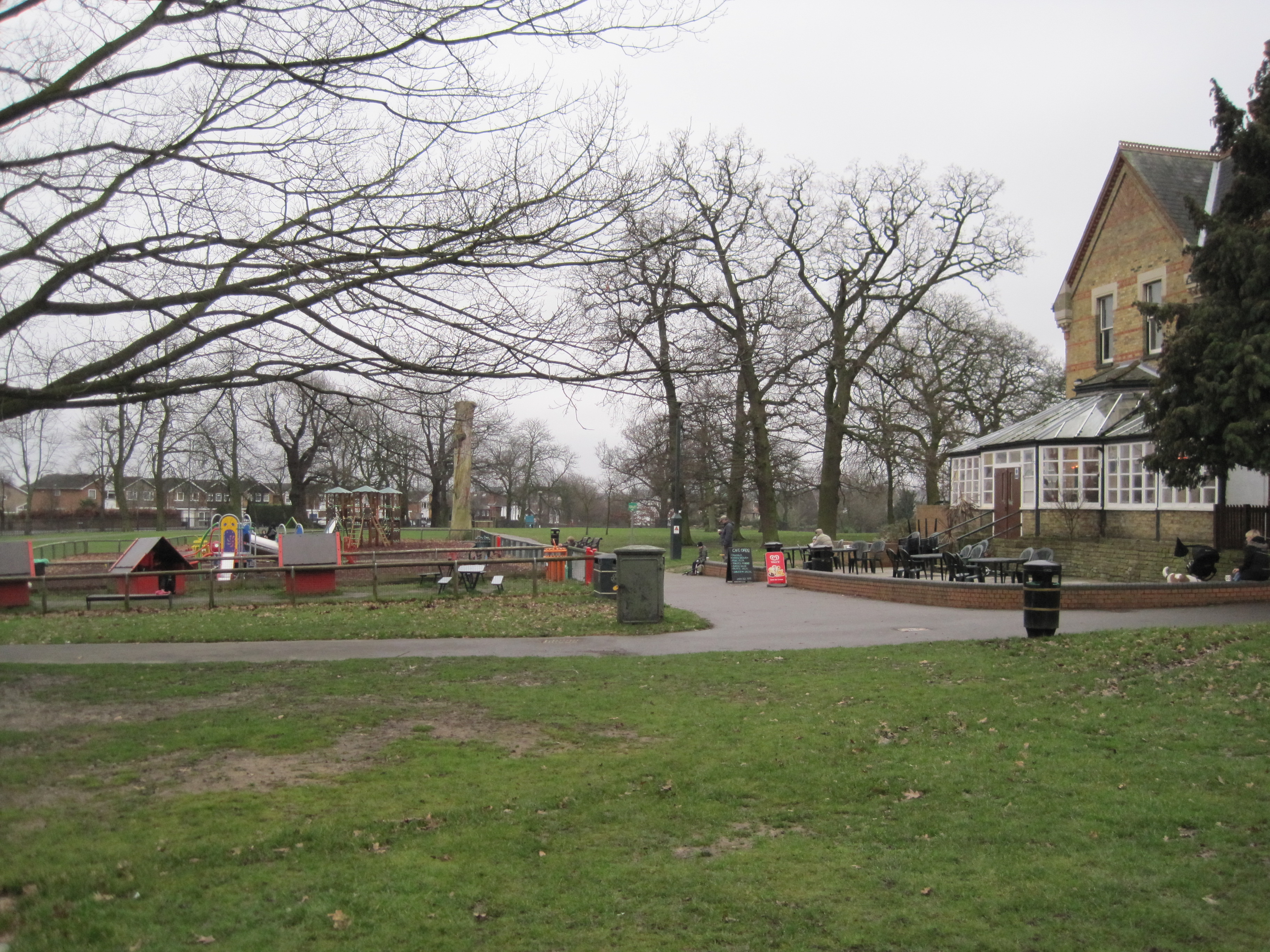
Children's playground and cafe

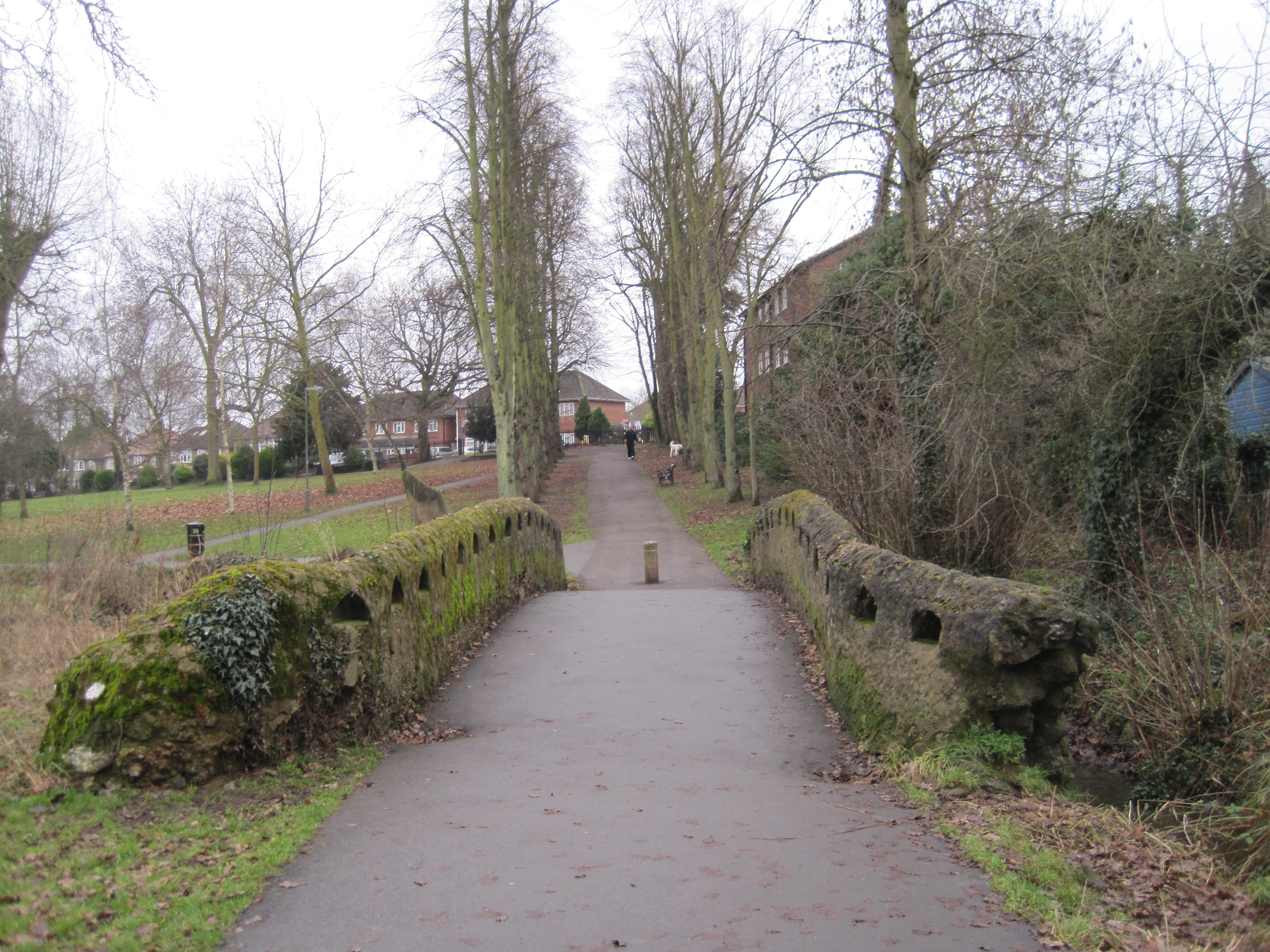
Bridge over the small stream

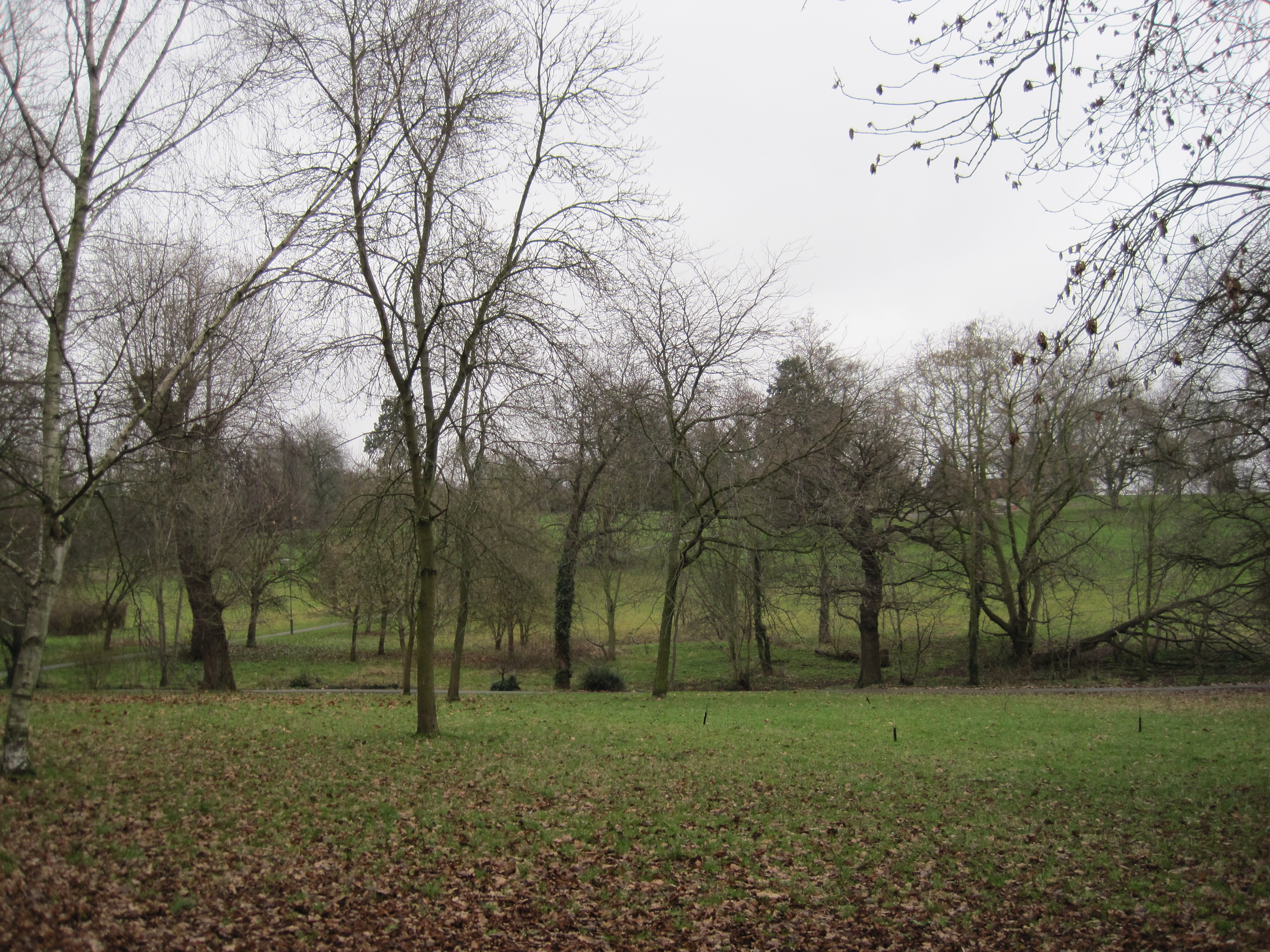
Woods

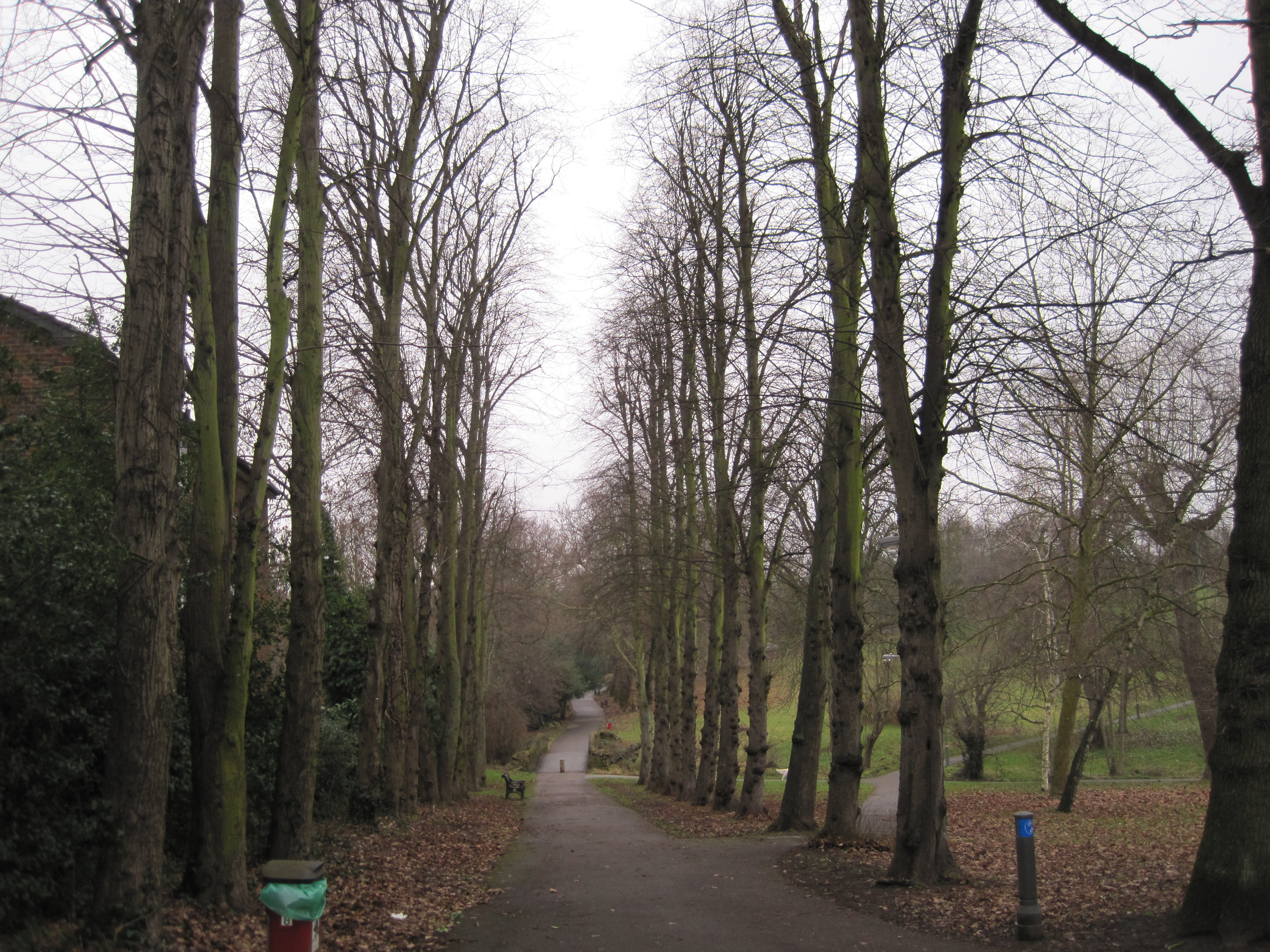
Avenue

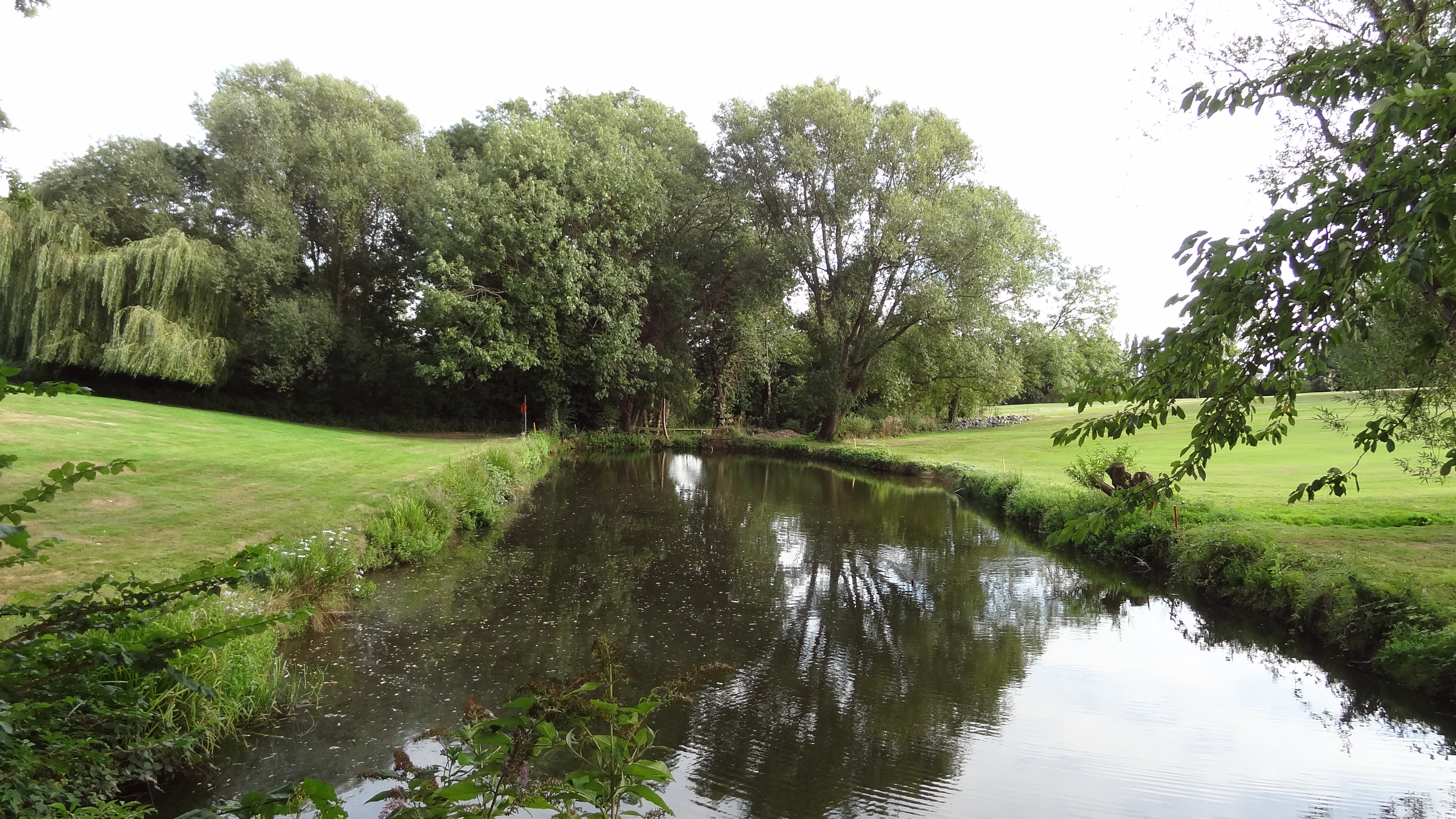
Pond on North Middlesex Golf Course

== See also ==
- Barnet parks and open spaces
- Nature reserves in Barnet
