= Charlotte Maria Tucker =

English writer (1821–1893)

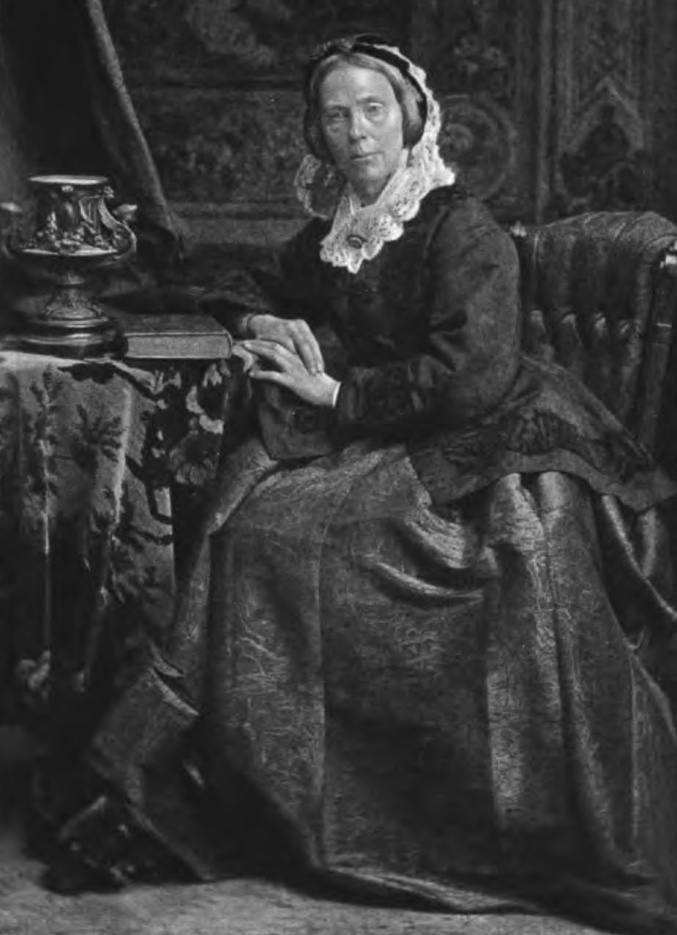
- Born: 2 May 1821; Barnet, Middlesex, England
- Died: 2 December 1893 (aged 72); Amritsar, India
- Occupation: Writer
- Writing career
- Pen name: A.L.O.E. (a Lady of England)
- Period: 19th century
- Genre: Children's Literature

Charlotte Maria Tucker (8 May 1821 – 2 December 1893) was a prolific English writer and poet for children and adults, who wrote under the pseudonym A.L.O.E. (a Lady of England). Late in life she spent a period as a volunteer missionary in India, where she died.

== Early life ==
Charlotte Tucker was born at Friern Hatch near Friern Barnet, Middlesex, the daughter of Henry St George Tucker (1771/2–1851), twice elected chairman of the British East India Company, and his wife Jane Boswell (died 1869), the daughter of an Edinburgh writer to the signet. The family moved to London in 1822. Her father was the author of Tragedies: 'Harold' and 'Camoens' (London, 1835).

Charlotte had a secular upbringing, and her first writings were poems and plays to amuse the family. In 1847, she took charge of the education of her brother Robert's three children. Her earliest book The Claremont Tales (1852) was, she said, "originally composed for young children under my charge."

== Moral tales ==
The work of Charlotte Tucker as a children's writer was imbued with her Evangelical religious beliefs. Most of her stories were allegories with a clear moral, but she leavened her didacticism with a degree of realism and naturalism. As she explained in an 1851 letter to a publisher, "My position in life renders me independent of any exertions of my own; I pray but for God's blessing upon my attempts to instruct His lambs in the things which concern their everlasting welfare."

Many of her 150 or more titles appeared in magazines before being collected into books. Among her titles were The Rambles of a Rat (1857), Parliament in the Play-Room (1861), Triumph over Midian (1866), A Wreath of Smoke (1871), The Eagles Nest (1884) and Pomegranates from the Punjab (1878). A biography by a fellow children's writer, Agnes Giberne, appeared in 1895.

The proceeds from her writings she often devoted to missionary or charity work. Tucker's contemporaries criticized the strong didacticism in her writing, but her creed was concerned not with original sin but with the chance of improvement for all people and races. Her realistic portrayals of the poor may have drawn on her experience as a workhouse visitor in Marylebone. Titles of hers are still occasionally reissued by publishers specializing in Christian books, including Lamplighter Ministries, an American nonprofit organization headquartered in Mount Morris, New York, best known for its Lamplighter Family Collection series.

== Missionary work ==
Many of Tucker's stories are set in India. Some were translated into Indian languages. She set out for India in 1875, at the age of 54, having taught herself Hindustani. There she worked as a self-supporting volunteer missionary to Amritsar, Punjab, through the Indian Female Normal School and Instruction Society. Three years later she moved to nearby Batala, where she worked in a boys' school and as a teacher of Christian beliefs to native women. She died in Amritsar on 2 December 1893.
