= Friern Barnet Urban District =

Former local government area in the UK

Friern Barnet
- Local Government District (1883–1894); Urban District (1894–1965)
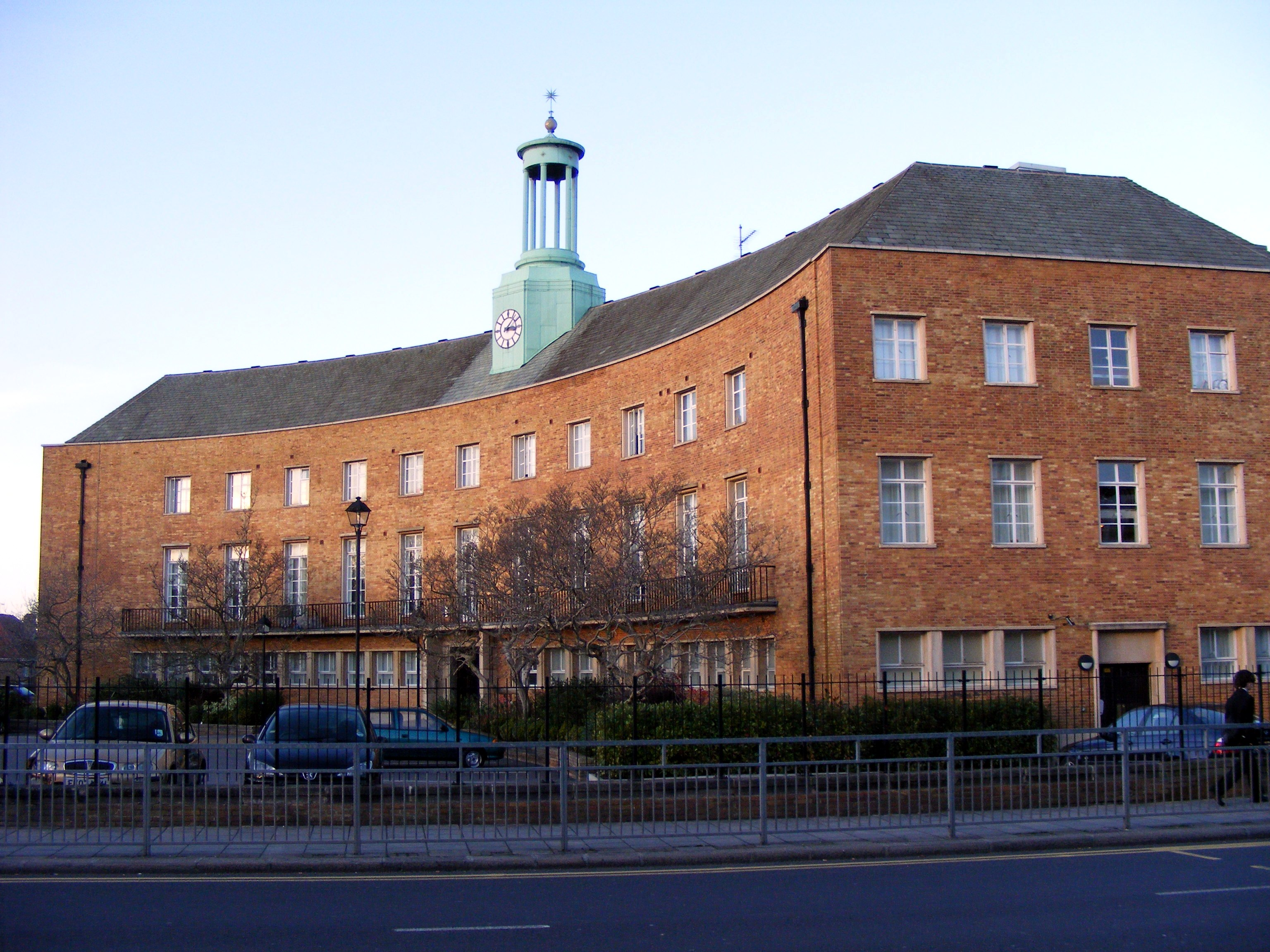
- Friern Barnet Town Hall

- Friern Barnet within Middlesex in 1961
- Area
  - 1855: 1,292 acres (5.228km²)
  - 1874: 1,303 acres (5.273km²)
  - 1899: 1,304 acres (5.277km²)
  - 1914: 1,304 acres (5.277km²)
- Area transferred
  - 1 April 1934: 59 acres: from Finchley UD (29); Hornsey UD (4); Southgate UD (11); Wood Green UD (15)
  - 1 April 1934: 23 acres: to Finchley UD (18); Hornsey UD (1); Southgate UD (4)
- Population
  - 1851: 974
  - 1861: 1,335
  - 1871: 4,347
  - 1881: 6,424
  - 1891: 9,173
  - 1901: 11,566
  - 1911: 14,924
- History
  - Preceded by: Barnet Poor Law Union
  - Origin: Local Government Act 1858
  - Created: 17 December 1883
  - Abolished: 31 March 1965
  - Succeeded by: London Borough of Barnet
- Status: Local Government District (1883–1894); Urban District (1894–1965)
- Government: Friern Barnet Local Board (1883–1894); Friern Barnet Urban District Council (1894–1965)
  - HQ: Parkhurst House, Friern Barnet Road, Friern Barnet (1884–1887); Tudor House, 18 Beaconsfield Road, Friern Barnet (1887–1906); The Priory, Friern Barnet (1906–1941); Friern Barnet Town Hall (1941–1965)
  - Motto: RURIS AMATOR (Lover of the country)
- Contained within
  - County: Middlesex
  - Hundred: Ossulstone
  - Petty sessional division: Highgate
  - County court district: Barnet
- Subdivisions
  - Type: Wards
  - Units: North, South, Central (1888–1945); North, South, East, West, Central (1945–1965)

Friern Barnet Urban District was a local government area in Middlesex, England created in 1883 from the civil parish Friern Barnet. It was succeeded by the London Borough of Barnet in 1965 as one of the smaller of its contributory predecessor districts. It was at the local level governed for 11 years by a local board, then by Friern Barnet Urban District Council which operated primarily with separate functions from the County Council, operating occasionally for major planning decisions and major projects together with that body, Middlesex County Council.

== Layout and two main settlements ==
Friern Barnet parish (and later this District) stretched 3 miles (4.8 km) north north-west from the boundary with Hornsey parish (specifically its Muswell Hill part) and was half as wide as long. The parish largely formed a counter-projection into the Chipping Barnet (also known as High Barnet or Barnet)-Totteridge projection of Hertfordshire into Middlesex to its north. In the north its land was the gentle, broad east escarpment above the head of the Dollis Brook rather than others which are higher and have several limbs around Barnet. In its south the land is gradually lower and a nascent brook feeds west to east, Bounds Green brook.

The parish/district had one main road; it was bisected lengthways by (the) High Road, the main road in the area, today the A1000 and part of the traditional Great North Road from London to Edinburgh.

Until the mid 19th century the ancient parish of Friern Barnet, a depopulated medieval village — the manor house, manor barn, farm and church of which survived, had two tiny developed clusters: Whetstone in the far north and Colney Hatch in the south.

Until 1883 the parish was governed by its vestry, in the same way as most rural areas. The parish was included in the Barnet poor law union in 1835, and therefore became part of the Barnet rural sanitary district on its creation in 1872, which meant the Barnet board of guardians took on powers relating to public health and sewerage in the parish. The parish was made a local government district in 1883, governed by a local board which took over the civil functions of the vestry and the sanitary functions of the board of guardians. Such local government districts were reconstituted as urban districts in 1894 under the Local Government Act 1894.

== Planned urbanisation ==
In common with most outer London areas, the vast bulk of housing was built after the coming of the railways and in this case mainly between the 1851 construction of New Southgate railway station near Colney Hatch (just within the south-east border) and the outbreak of World War II. A second station followed in 1871 which is a short distance from the north-west corner of the District and which is on the High Barnet branch of the Northern Line: Totteridge & Whetstone tube station. This led to high demand for housing in that area of the District.

The statistics in the panel to the right show the population change, accordingly.
