= St John, Friern Barnet =

Coordinates: 51°36′47″N 0°9′16″W

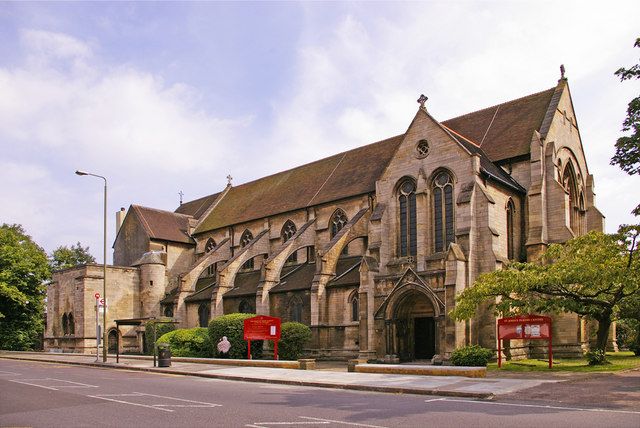
- St John's, Friern Barnet Road
- St John, Friern Barnet
- Location: Friern Barnet Road, London N11
- Country: England
- Denomination: Church of England
- Website: www.stjohnschurchfriernbarnet.org

Architecture
- Heritage designation: Grade II*
- Architect: John Loughborough Pearson
- Style: Gothic Revival

Administration
- Diocese: London
- Archdeaconry: Hampstead
- Deanery: Central Barnet
- Parish: St John, Friern Barnet

Clergy
- Rector: Reverend Dagmar V. Wilkinson

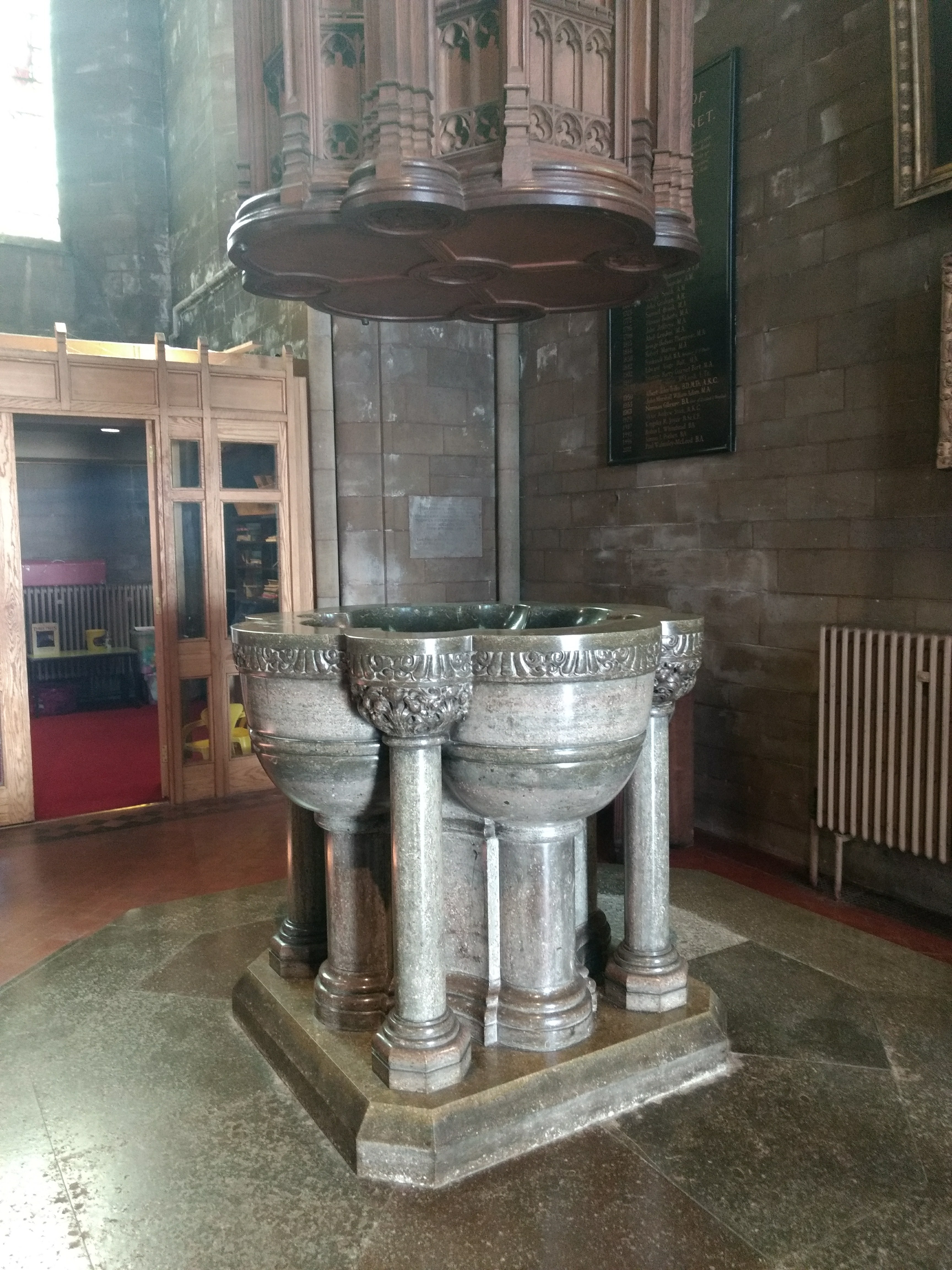
The font

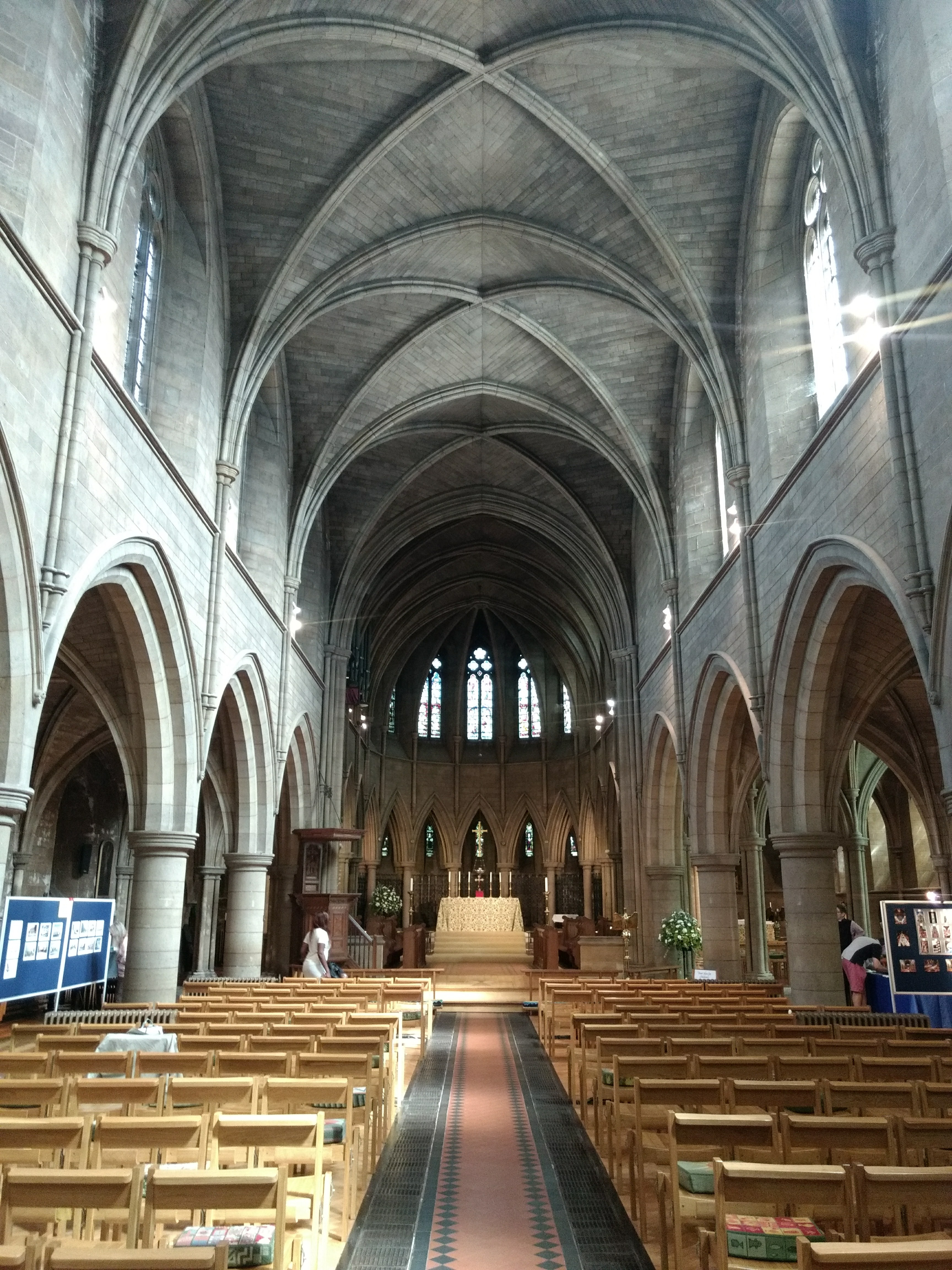
The nave

St John the Evangelist is an Anglican church on Friern Barnet Road, Borough of Barnet, north London. It is a late example of the Gothic Revival Style by Victorian architect John Loughborough Pearson, begun in 1890-91 and completed after his death by his son Frank Loughborough Pearson.

== History ==
Originating in 1883 as a chapel-of-ease to Friern Barnet parish church it was initially a temporary iron structure on the north side of Friern Barnet Road and known as the school-church of St John, on account of classes being kept there by the Friern Barnet Grammar School.

In 1890 it was replaced by an iron nave on the opposite side of the road on land granted to the Anglican Church Board by G. K. Smith, who, with his son Charles William Smith, contributed substantially towards building costs.

Although the chancel was consecrated in October 1892 by the Bishop of London Frederick Temple DD, building was delayed by a lack of funds, the nave being built in two stages and finally consecrated in 1911. Building of the eastern section was executed by Edward Abley of Salisbury.

== Architecture ==
The church is crafted entirely of stone to an elaborate plan and modelled on a Rhineland chapel. The east end was inspired by the German Cistercian church of Heisterbach on the request of the vicar, the Reverend Frederick Hall, who had formerly been curate at St. Augustine's, Kilburn, another of Pearson's celebrated works.

The church comprises an apsidal chancel with ambulatory and south chapel, two north vestries, an aisled and clerestoreyed nave, and a western narthex or baptistery of one bay. In an early Gothic style, it is vaulted throughout and originally seated 500. The nave was completed over 1899–1901. The west end being finished to only a modified design in 1911. The projected north-east tower and spire were not built.

The pulpit dates to c. 1920. The stained-glass panels are by specialist firm Clayton and Bell - the east windows depicting the adoration of the lamb, the south picturing angels, bishops and St Paul preaching, and the north Protestant worthies. The chancel windows are also a memorial to the Reverend Prebendary Frederick Hall, rector of Friern Barnet, by whom the building was commissioned. A depiction of the architect, Pearson, with a scroll of the plans, is included.

The church has since been afforded Grade II* architectural status by the English Heritage foundation, by which it is deemed a building of particular (national) importance and one of more than special interest.

== Current status ==
The church now serves as the parish church of Friern Barnet, the former parish church of St James the Great in Friern Barnet Lane now being leased to the local Greek Orthodox community. The church has long been linked to local education; there has been a St John's school in Friern Barnet since 1886, now (as of 2015) St John's CofE Primary School

== Curates ==
List of curates:

- 1884-87 Robert Bettison Barber AKC
- 1887-89 Bernard Day Douglas Shaw AKC
- 1889-92 Frederick Voight

After which time the rector of Friern Barnet resumed charge. The Rev Frederick Hall was rector from 1892 to 1902, and his son the Rev Edward Gage Hall from 1902 to 1940. The Rev'd John Trillo was rector during the 1950s.

== References and sources ==
Sources

- National Archives: Saint James the Great, Friern Barnet DRO/012/I/G8
