= Lawrence Campe Almshouses =

Almshouses in Barnet, London

Coordinates: 51°37′32″N 0°10′12″W

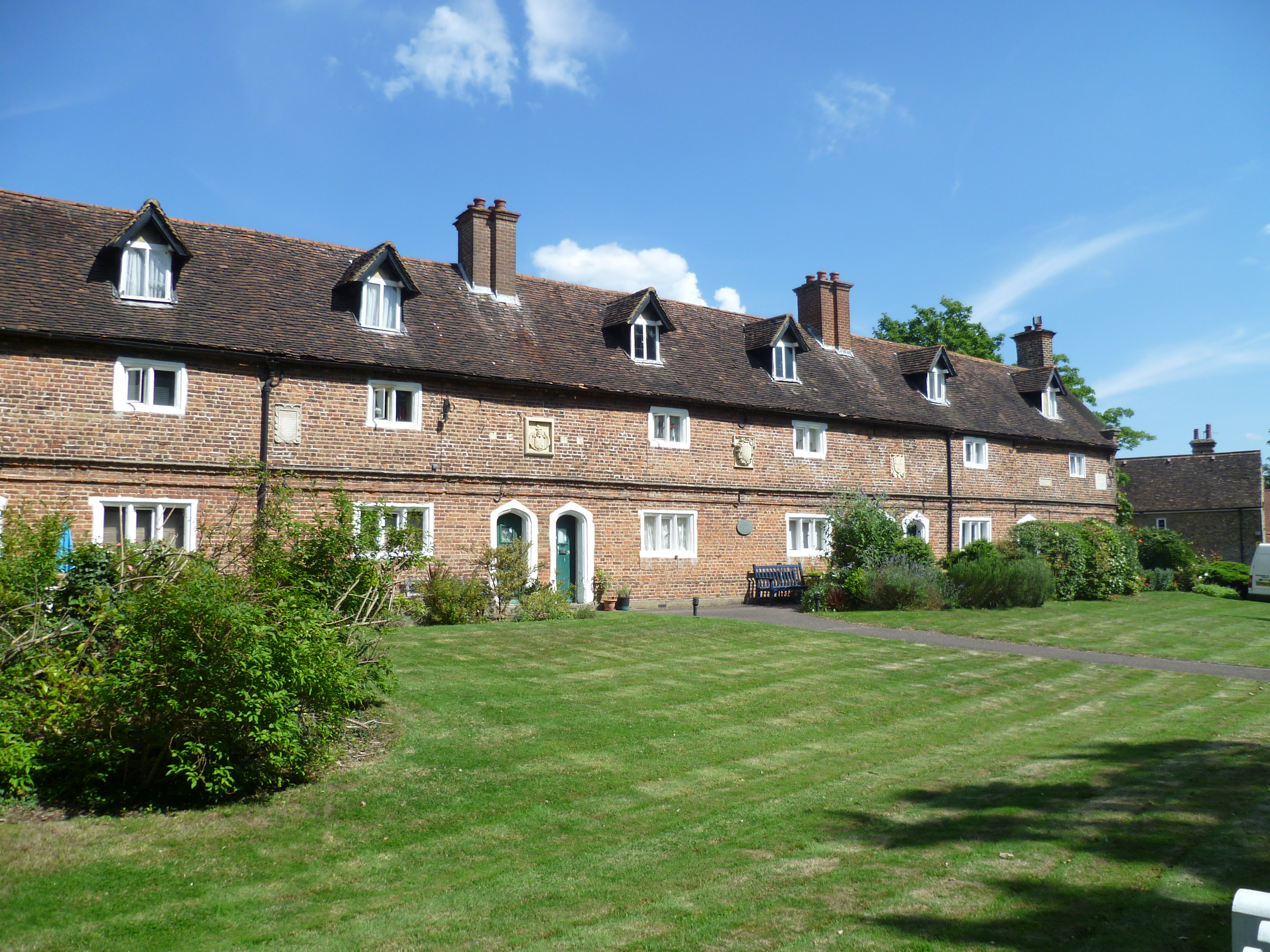
Lawrence Campe Almshouses

The Lawrence Campe Almshouses at Friern Barnet Lane, Whetstone, London, are grade II listed buildings with Historic England.

The almshouses were built around 1612 to provide accommodation for 12 poor people. They were funded by Lawrence Campe (died 1613), a draper's merchant in the City of London, and the residents were given an allowance of one shilling per month.

The houses are administered by Lawrence Campe's Almshouse Trust. They are some of the oldest almshouses in London.
