= Ashleigh Brilliant =

British and American epigrammatist and cartoonist (1933–2025)

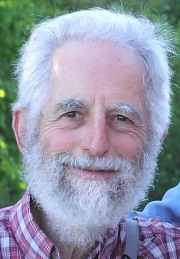
- Born: December 9, 1933; London, England
- Died: September 24, 2025 (aged 91); Santa Barbara, California, U.S.
- Education: University College London; Claremont Graduate University; University of California, Berkeley
- Occupations: Author and syndicated cartoonist
- Spouse: Dorothy Tucker (m. 1968; died 2018)

Ashleigh Ellwood Brilliant (December 9, 1933 – September 24, 2025) was a British and American epigrammatist and cartoonist. He was best known for his "Pot-Shots", single-panel illustrations with one-line humorous remarks, which began syndication in the United States in 1975.

== Early life ==
Brilliant was born in London, England, on December 9, 1933, to Victor and Amelia Brilliant who were English Jews. In 1939 the turmoil of World War II led Brilliant's mother to move with Brilliant and his younger sister, Myrna, to her hometown of Toronto in Canada. Brilliant's father remained in the UK. The family then immigrated to the United States in 1941, settling in Washington, D.C., where Brilliant's father joined them. The family returned to the U.K. in 1947, after which Brilliant attended Hendon County School.

Brilliant earned a history degree from University College London and lived for a time in Australia before returning to live in the United States in 1956. He earned a master's degree from Claremont Graduate School (now Claremont Graduate University) in 1957 and a PhD in history and geography from UC Berkeley in 1964. He taught at Central Oregon Community College in Bend, Oregon, from 1964 to 1965. He sailed around the world twice while teaching aboard a research vessel as part of Chapman University's University of the Seven Seas (now Semester at Sea) program. Brilliant met his future wife, Dorothy, during his second voyage.

During the 1967 Summer of Love in San Francisco, Brilliant gave daily lectures near the Haight Street entrance of Golden Gate Park. He released a live album recorded at the park in 1967 on a small Hollywood, California, record label, Dorash Enterprises (Dorash LP-1001). The album, Ashleigh Brilliant in the Haight-Ashbury, is now rare. The material uses familiar public domain tunes and melodies and incorporates clever poetic lyrics about marijuana, the Diggers, San Francisco neighborhoods, and his personal experiences, all the while displaying a banter which ebbs and flows with his audience, who respond warmly to the performance and also participate in the songs. He states in the recording that he had been performing in this setting for approximately two hours each day the prior four weeks. He laughs throughout his performance, while the audience joins him in singing along and banging on percussive items. The album ends with "Haight-Ashbury Farewell".

== Career ==
The Wall Street Journal described Brilliant in a 1992 profile as "history's only full time, professional published epigrammatist".

At one time, there was some confusion and controversy as to the ownership and recognition of Brilliant's distinctive art form. In a copyright infringement suit filed by him, a United States federal judge ruled that, while short phrases are not eligible for copyright, Brilliant's works were epigrams and therefore copyrightable (Brilliant v. W.B. Productions Inc., 1979).

While Brilliant employed a self-imposed limit of 17 words per epigram, he wrote and published 41 with 18 words and one with 19 words. Once discovered, all of these were corrected and republished by him.

In 1999 he authored an article called "Y1K Crisis" which parodies the Y2K computing crisis that was expected to happen at the end of that year.

Part of the counter-culture scene in San Francisco in the late 1960s, Brilliant wrote and sang a series of parody songs about the hippie movement in Golden Gate Park as the movement happened. Called The Haight-Ashbury Songbook, the songs now appear on a CD collection available on his website.

== Copyright controversies ==
In his 1998 book Information Liberation, Brian Martin cites Brilliant as a "professional epigrammatist" who has been known to threaten legal action in order to display his market precedence over legally owned fragments of human language, thus managing to reveal one of the many absurdities behind "intellectual property", namely its ability to limit the free use and dissemination of human expression. When Brilliant found someone who has "used" one of his epigrams, he contacted them demanding a payment for breach of copyright. For instance, in 1991 television journalist David Brinkley wrote a book, Everyone is Entitled to My Opinion, the title of which he attributed to a friend of his daughter. Brilliant contacted Brinkley about copyright violation, concerned that this friend had been "subconsciously quoting" an aphorism that Brilliant had copyrighted in 1974. Random House, Brinkley's publisher, paid Brilliant $1000 without contesting the issue.

In a separate 1979 case, a company copied two of Brilliant's phrases – "I may not be totally perfect, but parts of me are excellent" and "I have abandoned my search for truth and am now looking for a good fantasy" — and altered a third phrase, all for sale on T-shirt transfers. The district court acknowledged that the phrases were distinguished by conciseness, cleverness, and pointed observation, ruling that they were protected by copyright.

== Personal life and death ==
Brilliant met Dorothy Tucker in 1965 while sailing around the world as a teacher in residence aboard a research vessel. They married in 1968 and settled in Santa Barbara, California, in 1973. Brilliant lived near the Santa Barbara Mission and maintained an office on West Valerio Street. Dorothy died on May 24, 2018.

Brilliant died at a hospital in Santa Barbara, California, on September 24, 2025, at the age of 91.

== Books ==
All books published by Woodbridge Press (Santa Barbara, California):

- I May Not Be Totally Perfect, but Parts of Me Are Excellent, and Other Brilliant Thoughts (1979), ISBN 0-912800-66-6, ISBN 0-912800-67-4
- I Have Abandoned My Search for Truth, and Am Now Looking for a Good Fantasy: More Brilliant Thoughts (1980), ISBN 0-912800-89-5, ISBN 0-912800-90-9 (paperback)
- Appreciate Me Now, and Avoid the Rush: Yet More Brilliant Thoughts (1981), ISBN 0-912800-97-6, ISBN 0-912800-94-1 (paperback) at Internet Archive
- I Feel Much Better, Now That I've Given Up Hope: And Even More Brilliant Thoughts (1984), ISBN 0-88007-145-1, ISBN 0-88007-147-8 (paperback)
- All I Want Is a Warm Bed and a Kind Word and Unlimited Power: Even More Brilliant Thoughts (1985), ISBN 0-88007-155-9, ISBN 0-88007-156-7 (paperback)
- The Great Car Craze: How Southern California Collided with the Automobile in the 1920s (1989), ISBN 0-88007-172-9.
- Be a Good Neighbor, and Leave Me Alone: And Other Wry and Riotous Writings (1992), ISBN 0-88007-191-5, ISBN 0-88007-192-3 (paperback)
- I Try to Take One Day at a Time, but Sometimes Several Days Attack Me at Once: More Brilliant Thoughts Than Ever (1987), ISBN 0-88007-161-3, ISBN 0-88007-162-1 (paperback)
- We've Been Through So Much Together, and Most of It Was Your Fault: More and More Brilliant Thoughts (1990), ISBN 0-88007-182-6, ISBN 0-88007-183-4
- I Want to Reach Your Mind... Where Is It Currently Located?: More Incredibly Brilliant Thoughts (1994), ISBN 0-88007-203-2, ISBN 0-88007-204-0 (paperback)
- I'm Just Moving Clouds Today, Tomorrow I'll Try Mountains: And Other More or Less Blissfully Brilliant Thoughts (1998), ISBN 0-88007-221-0

== Sources ==
- Strickler, Dave. Syndicated Comic Strips and Artists, 1924–1995: The Complete Index. Cambria, CA: Comics Access, 1995. ISBN 0-9700077-0-1 at Internet Archive
