= Hendon School =

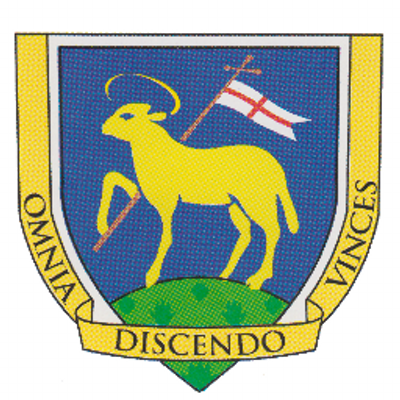

Location
- Golders Rise; Hendon, London, NW4 2HP; England; 51.586°N 0.218°W

Information
- Type: Academy
- Motto: Latin: Omnia discendo vinces (Knowledge conquers everything)
- Established: 1914
- Department for Education URN: 137645 Tables
- Ofsted: Reports
- Chair of Governance: Andrew Leslie
- Headteacher: Rhona Povey/Craig McGuire
- Staff: 150
- Gender: Coeducational
- Age: 11 to 18
- Enrolment: 1,269
- Capacity: 1,269
- Colour: Navy blue
- Website: https://www.hendonschool.co.uk/

Hendon School is a mixed secondary school in Golders Rise, Hendon, with academy status since November 2011 (previously a comprehensive) in the London Borough of Barnet.

== Overview ==
Hendon School is a mixed comprehensive school with 1,253 pupils on roll, including approximately 240 sixth form students. The school is situated just off the A502 and North Circular Road in London. It serves an area that is generally more affluent than average but has some pockets of deprivation, as interpreted in comparison to national averages according to Ofsted.

The student population is culturally diverse, multi-faith and multi-lingual, with more than half of students speaking languages other than English as their first language. The proportion of students eligible for free school meals is well above the national average. The school specialises in languages, and has specialist educational facilities for deaf students and for autistic students.

== History ==
Hendon School now occupies the site where the 16th-century mapmaker John Norden lived, and only a pond survives from the park of Greenhill.

=== Hendon County School ===
The Hendon County School opened as a fee-paying school of 350 pupils in September 1914, just a month after the outbreak of the First World War. By 1927, the field at the back of the school was levelled and trees planted, and in 1929–1930 the building of the gymnasium was started. In 1931, the intake of pupils rose from a two form entry to a three form entry, and by 1932–1933 the extension on the north side of the original school building was finished to enable accommodation of 480 pupils. In 1936 former pupil Harold Whitlock planted an oak tree sapling in front of the entrance to the gymnasium which he had received, along with his gold medal for the 50 kilometres (31 mi) walk, from Adolf Hitler at the Berlin Olympic Games.

=== Hendon County Grammar School ===
As a result of the Education Act 1944, the school became a selective grammar school, for the purposes of the Eleven-plus, and over some years came to adopt the word "Grammar" into its name. By 1955, the school had 620 pupils and 32 staff, resulting in a necessary extension on the east side of the main building, which included a new Hall, Dining Hall and Kitchens. This was officially opened in 1961. In the late 1960s, when plans for the reorganisation of secondary education were passed by Parliament, the London Borough of Barnet suggested the amalgamation of Hendon County Grammar School, situated in Golders Rise, with St David's County Secondary School for Boys, in St David's Place, West Hendon. Hendon Grammar School Choir released commercial recordings with Owen Brannigan, with traditional British songs.

=== Former St David's County Secondary School pre-1971 ===
On 1 October 1929, Barnfield Senior Boys’ School opened in Silkstream Road, Burnt Oak, Edgware with 267 boys. In January 1964 it amalgamated with Brent Secondary Modern School on its site in Sturgess Avenue, West Hendon. Brent Modern School, a mixed school, had opened on 7 January 1936 having been formally inaugurated the previous October by Princess Louise, Duchess of Argyll, the daughter of Queen Victoria. In readiness for the joining of the Barnfield and Brent schools, new buildings were erected in St David's Place, and the two adjacent sites became one school named St David's after its location. Originally it was to be named The Grahame-White School after Claude Grahame-White, the famous English aviator who had established Hendon Aerodrome, but permission by his family was declined.

=== Hendon Senior High School ===
In 1971, this merger took place. Hendon County Grammar School became Hendon Senior High School, and St David's County Secondary School for Boys was renamed Hendon Junior High School. In 1978, when all the new buildings on the Hendon County site were finished, the whole school became completely integrated on one site and called by its present name Hendon School.

During 1987–88 the school was threatened with closure by the London Borough of Barnet claiming falsely that it was no longer a viable institution, but by 1988–1989 the school had survived the threat and was awarded Grant-maintained status by the Conservative Government. Hendon became a foundation school with the changes to state funding of education which were brought about by the School Standards and Framework Act 1998. Extensions to the new buildings close to the perimeter on the south side of the site took place during the 1990s to provide extra room for the Mathematics and Music departments.

== Hendon School today ==
The school currently has an eight form intake with approximately 1,350 pupils, 120 teachers and 30 ancillary staff as well as a Saturday School for Languages with 200 pupils and 11 teachers. With an expanding sixth form roll, the school built a new Sixth Form Centre close to the eastern perimeter of the 6-acre site in 2011, which provides classrooms and facilities exclusively for use by the sixth form students. In late 2011, the school completed the expansion of the autism unit and the expansion of internal and external dining facilities within and around the original school building. In November 2011, the school converted to become an academy school, although chose not to change the name of the school. The Ofsted inspection in November 2011 graded the school to be outstanding. The school was previously a "failing school" in Special Measures by Ofsted in 2005 and subsequently deemed Satisfactory. The latest review of the school by Ofsted was in 2022 and the school was given an overall rating of "good".

The school is governed by a governing board made of parents, teachers and other community members.

== Notable former pupils ==
- Morgan Fisher, musician and photographer (1961–68)
- Harry Melling
- Michael Obiora
- James Ward
- Antony Costa
- Amber Rose Revah

=== Hendon County Grammar School ===
- Dora Black (née Braham), director, Royal Free Hospital child trauma clinic
- Lionel Blue
- Bernard Braine, Baron Braine of Wheatley, former Conservative MP
- Ashleigh Brilliant, writer and cartoonist (1947–52)
- Philip Cohen, Royal Society research professor
- Robert Earl, founder of the Planet Hollywood chain
- Mark Freedland, professor of employment law
- Harvey Goldstein, professor of social statistics
- Christopher Gunning, composer
- Ruth Prawer Jhabvala, novelist
- Peter Maitlis, organometallic chemist
- Peter Mandelson, former Labour Party politician, lobbyist and diplomat
- Gerald Ratner
- Michael Sternberg, professor at Imperial College London
- Oliver Stark, actor
- Harold Whitlock, Olympic walker
- Frank Williams, known for playing the Reverend Timothy Farthing in Dad's Army

== See also ==
- List of schools in the London Borough of Barnet
- London Borough of Barnet
