= Dwight School London =

Location
- 6 Friern Barnet Lane; London, N11 3LX
- Coordinates: 51.6139°N 0.1592°W

Information
- Former names: North London International School
- Type: Private day school International school
- Opened: 1885
- Head of School: Chris Beddows
- Principal (Junior School): Helen Enisuoh
- Principal (Senior School): William Bowry
- Gender: Co-educational
- Age range: 2–18
- Accreditation: IBO
- Affiliations: Dwight Global
- Website: www.dwightlondon.org

Dwight School London is an independent co-educational international school in North Finchley and Friern Barnet areas of north London, United Kingdom. The school educates children from the ages of 2-18 and consists of the senior and primary schools plus has a nursery. It offers the International Baccalaureate programme at all levels. It is part of the Dwight global family of schools which have presences in New York, Dubai, Hanoi, Shanghai, and Seoul.

== History ==
The school initially developed from the Holmewood Boys' preparatory school founded in 1885 at North Finchley, which in 1985 was acquired by the Dwight Franklin Foundation and the family of the then Chancellor of the Dwight School, New York, which remains the sister school of Dwight School London.

In 1988, Holmewood merged with St Alban's School, becoming co-educational and being renamed Woodside Park Preparatory School, which in 1995 consolidated with the Friern Barnet Grammar School for Boys to form the Woodside Park School (later Woodside Park International School) for the education of pupils from the ages 4 to 18.

In December 1995, the senior department was accredited by the International Baccalaureate Organisation to teach the IB Diploma Programme; in 2003, to teach the IB Middle Years Programme, and the following year the junior department the IB Primary Years Programme. Consequently, the school became one of only a handful of British establishments to deliver the full range of IB teaching programmes for pupils aged 3 to 19.

In May 2006, the school came under sole ownership and was listed as a limited company with an age range of 3 to 18 years old. In 2008, it was renamed North London International School. The current name was adopted in 2012 to emphasize its links with the original Dwight School.

== Academics ==
Dwight School London is one of the few schools in the United Kingdom which offers the International Baccalaureate at all three levels: the Primary Years Programme (PYP), the Middle Years Programme (MYP) and the Diploma Programme (DP). Academic support is offered to pupils who need additional support to fully participate in the IB programmes.

== Organisation ==
The school is organised into three divisions:

- Early Years (nursery and reception)
- Junior School (Primary Years Programme, Years 1 to 6)
- Senior School (Middle Years Programme and Diploma Programme, Years 7 to 13 equivalent)
