= Lawrence Campe =

Merchant (died 1613)

- Died: 1613
- Occupation: Merchant

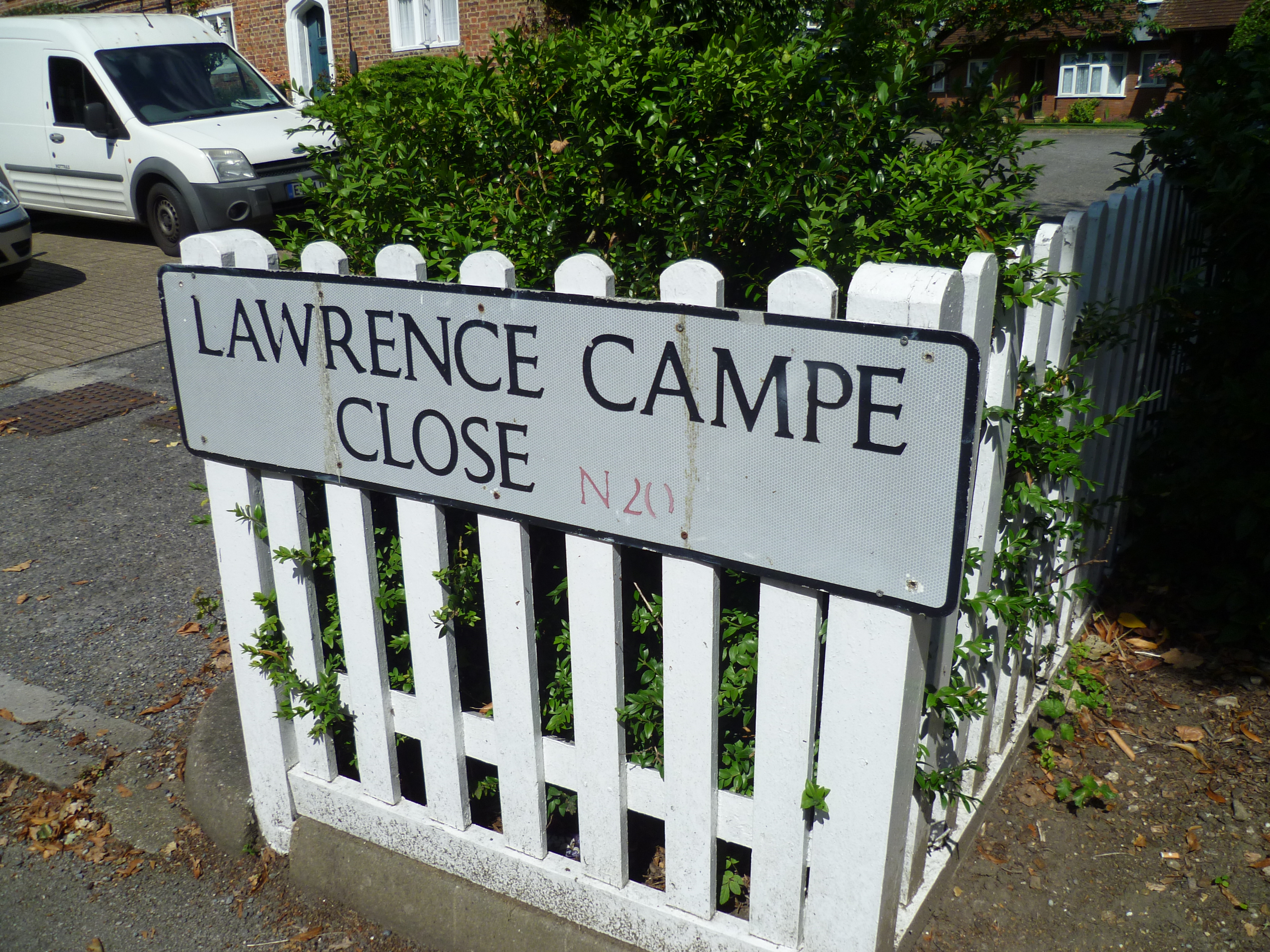
Lawrence Campe Close sign, London N20.

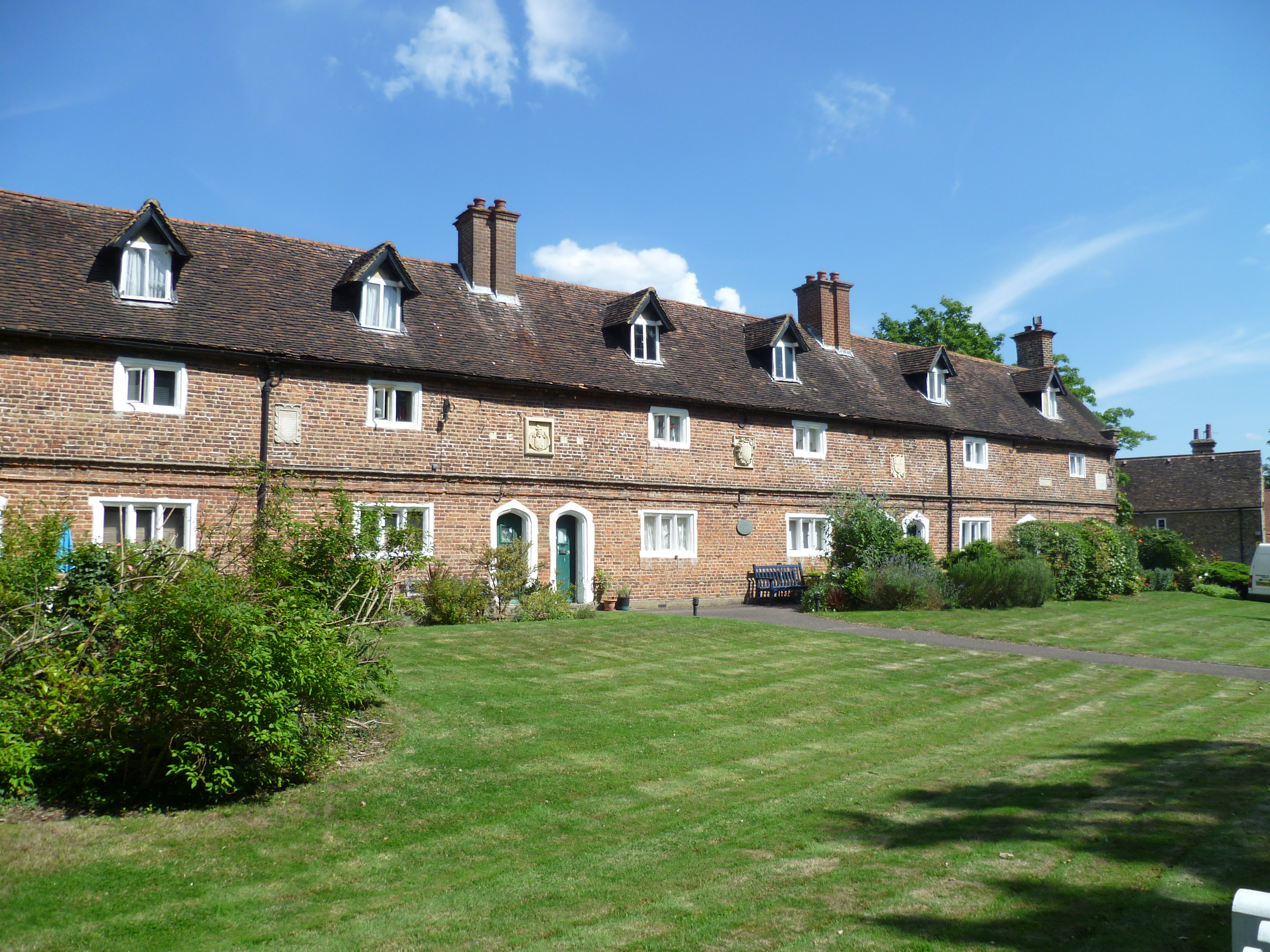
Lawrence Campe Almshouses

Lawrence Campe (died 1613) was a draper's merchant and citizen of the City of London who gave money to build almshouses in "Fryan Barnett". The Lawrence Campe Almshouses at Friern Barnet Lane, Whetstone, are grade II listed buildings with Historic England. After his death, his widow married Thomas Tooke who also made charitable donations for the poor. Campe is remembered in Lawrence Campe Close, adjacent to his almshouses in Whetstone.
