= St Mary's and St John's Church of England School =

St Mary's and St John's CE School

Location
- Sunningfields Road; Hendon, Greater London, NW4 4QR; England
- Coordinates: 51.584725°N 0.22714°W

Information
- Type: Voluntary aided school
- Motto: Wisdom-Service-Hope 'with God, all things are possible. ' (Matthew 19:26)
- Religious affiliation: Church of England
- Established: 1707
- Local authority: Barnet
- Department for Education URN: 103119 Tables
- Ofsted: Reports
- Principal: Gavin Smith
- Gender: Coeducational
- Age: 3 to 18
- Enrolment: 1,567 as of January 2023
- Campuses: Neale House, Bennett House, Stamford Raffles
- Houses: Anderson; Dickens; Elgar; Fonteyn; Livingstone; Nightingale
- Colours: Green, Grey, Gold
- Website: http://www.smsj.barnet.sch.uk/

St Mary's and St John's CE School is a coeducational Church of England all-through school located in the Hendon area of the London Borough of Barnet, England. The school admits pupils aged 3 – 18. Known as SMSJ, it was created by the London Diocesan Board for Schools and London Borough of Barnet to provide a mixed Church of England-based education up to sixth form for an increasing number of pupils in the Barnet area. It was the first all-through school in Barnet. It specialises in performing arts as well as Business & Enterprise, offering Music, Dance & Drama to its students, as well as scholarships in these subjects.

It is based on 3 sites: A Nursery School and Reception to Year 4 are based at the Lower School on Prothero Gardens; Years 5 - 8 at the Middle School on Sunningfields Road and Years 9 - 13 at the Stamford Raffles campus on the Downage. The school has undergone a huge refurbishment and rebuilding programme, with the newest site opening in Downage in September 2017.

It is a voluntary aided school, part of the London Diocesan Board of Schools, administered by the Church of England Diocese of London and Barnet London Borough Council.

Reportedly, the school's motto for many years was "Audio, Video, Disco", Latin for "I hear, I see, I learn". This motto gained some notoriety in 1983, after all three words had gained new meaning in English.

Previously a primary school located at Prothero Gardens in Hendon, SMSJ was asked to expand by Barnet Local Authority and began accepting secondary school age pupils in September 2014 when the Middle School site opened on the former St Mary's CE School Upper Site in Sunningfields Road. The building was officially opened by the then Bishop of London, Richard Chartres.

The school operates a sixth form, and has a pupil roll of some 1,800 pupils across its three sites. The third campus and Upper School building, Stamford Raffles opened on the former St Mary's Lower School site in Downage in September 2017. It was officially opened by the Bishop of Edmonton, Rob Wickham, in November 2017.

St Mary's and St John's Church of England School offers GCSEs as programmes of study for pupils, whilst students in the sixth form have the option to study from a range of A-Levels.
