= Friern Barnet Town Hall =

Municipal building in London, England

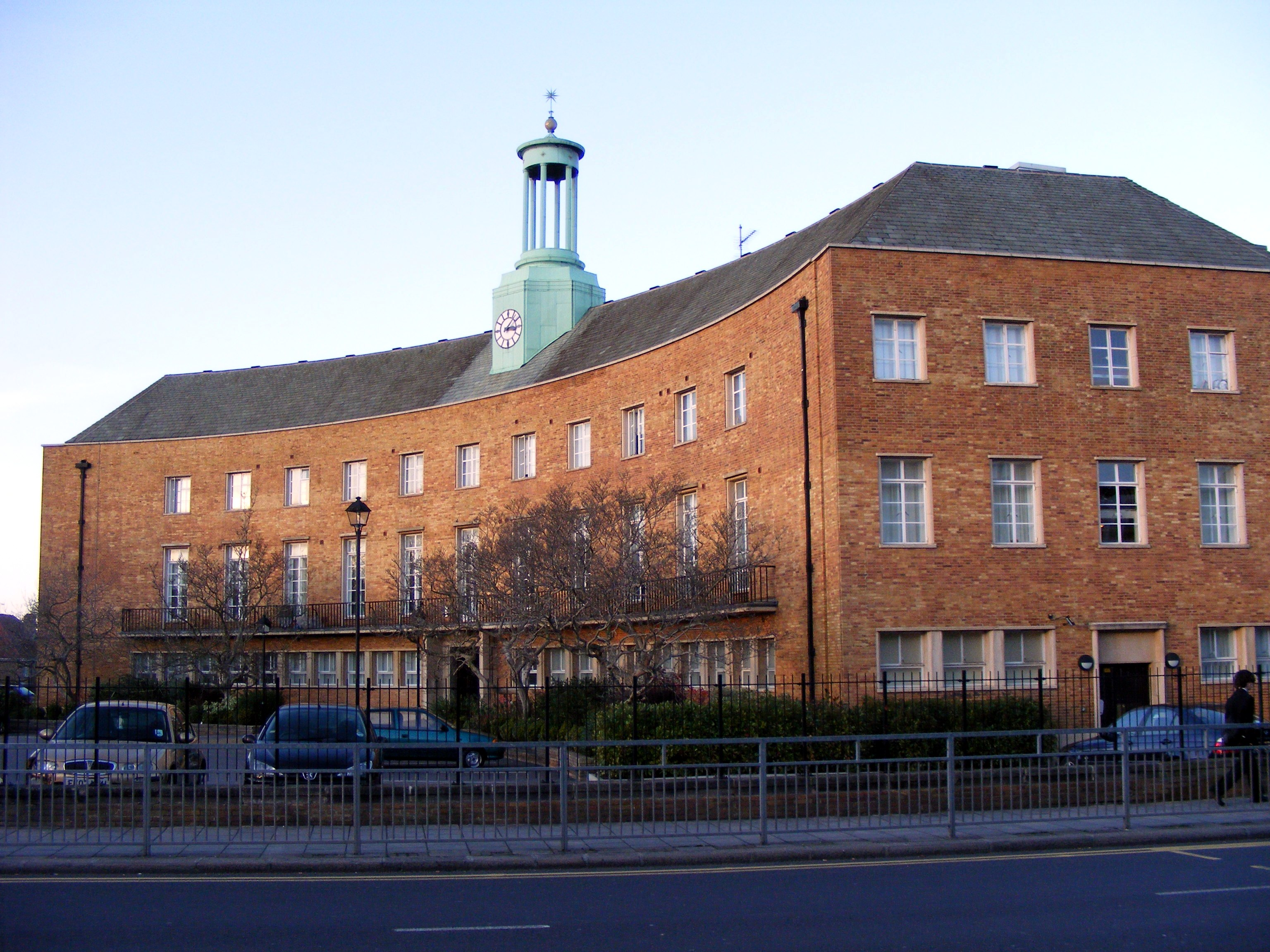
- Friern Barnet Town Hall

- Shown in Barnet
- 51.6135°N 0.1581°W
- Location: Friern Barnet

History
- Built: 1941

Site notes
- Architect(s): Sir John Brown, A E Henson and Partners
- Architectural style: Neo-Georgian style

Listed Building – Grade II
- Official name: Former Friern Barnet Town Hall
- Designated: 2 July 2002
- Reference no.: 1360822

Friern Barnet Town Hall is a municipal building in Friern Barnet Lane in Friern Barnet, London, England. The building, which was the headquarters of Friern Barnet Urban District Council from 1941 to 1965, is a Grade II listed building.

== History ==
In the late 19th century, the new Friern Barnet Urban District Council, which had been established in 1894, based itself at offices in Tudor House in Beaconsfield Road but then moved to an 18th-century mansion known as The Priory in Friern Barnet Lane in 1906.

Following significant urban growth in the early 20th century in what was then a developing outer London district, civic leaders decided to demolish The Priory and replace it with a modern town hall on the same site. They appointed Charles Cowles-Voysey, who had designed Watford Town Hall, to assess the design competition: the influence of Cowles-Voysey was apparent in the shape and features of the proposed building. A foundation stone for the new building was laid by the Council Chairman, Councillor John Edward Pickering, on 16 September 1939. It was designed by Sir John Brown, A E Henson and Partners in the Neo-Georgian style and was officially opened on 16 June 1941.

The design involved a concave main frontage of eleven bays facing onto the corner of Friern Barnet Lane and Friern Barnet Road; the central section featured a doorway on the ground floor with a wide cast iron balcony and shield above; there was a clock with a lantern above at roof level. English Heritage has described it as "a good example of pared-down modernism". The principal room was the council chamber which was contained within a structure jutting out to the rear of the main building. A control centre was established in the basement for civil defence purposes in the event of an enemy bomb attack. The future Prime Minister, Margaret Thatcher, gave a speech to the Friern Barnet Young Conservatives in the town hall in September 1965.

The building continued to serve as the headquarters of Friern Barnet Urban District for much of the 20th century but ceased to be the local seat of government following the formation of the London Borough of Barnet in 1965. The building was subsequently used as workspace for Barnet Council's education and children's departments.

After a review by Barnet Council of all its properties in 2002, the building was deemed to be surplus to requirements and sold to Barratt Developments. A programme of works to convert the town hall into a block of apartments known as Aldermen Court was completed in July 2005.
