= Wren Academy =

All-through academy school in London, England

Location
- Warnham Road, North Finchley; London, N12 9NW; England; 51.61265°N 0.16812°W

Information
- Type: Academy
- Religious affiliation: Church of England
- Established: 2008
- Department for Education URN: 135507 Tables
- Ofsted: Reports
- Gender: Mixed
- Age: 4 to 18
- Enrolment: 1'564
- Website: www.wrenacademy.org

Wren Academy is a mixed all-through school (plus sixth form) located in North Finchley, London, England.

It was opened in 2008. In 2015 Wren Academy opened a primary school phase. The school also has an in-house chapel.

== All Through Academy ==
Wren Academy is an all-through academy school, including Sixth form, meaning that it has pupils and students from Reception through to Year 13. Starting in 2008 with 6 forms of 180 Year 7 students the Academy grew each year with additional year groups added. The Sixth Form opened in 2013 with a two form Primary school phase starting in 2015. The school has 1640 pupils and students.

It is a mixed sex comprehensive school, where pupils are taught in single sex classes in core subjects (Maths, English and Science), and top-set Physical Education classes.

The school is sponsored by London Diocesan Board for Schools and a broadly Christian ethos guided from the Church of England. It is co-sponsored by Berkhamsted School.

The Academy is an associate member of the Woodard group of schools.

=== Ofsted Inspections ===
Since opening in 2008 Wren Academy has received three Outstanding Ofsted reports. The latest in 2018 covered the Primary and Secondary phases rating the school outstanding in every category.

== Staff ==
Adam Justice-Mills, convicted of 78 counts of child sexual offences in Barnet and Haringey between 2000 and 2020, was a full-time cover supervisor at the school from September 2010 to July 2014.
