= The Compton School =

Coordinates: 51°36′33.8″N 0°9′49.5″W

Location
- Summers Lane; Friern Barnet, Greater London, N12 0QG; England

Information
- Type: Converter academy
- Motto: Excellence through Dedication and Respect
- Established: 1992
- Department for Education URN: 136418 Tables
- Ofsted: Reports
- Headteacher: Ann Marie Mulkerins
- Gender: Co-Educational
- Age: 11 to 18
- Colours: Teal , White
- Website: http://www.thecompton.org.uk/

The Compton School is situated on Summers Lane, North Finchley, London, England. It is an academy school for boys and girls aged eleven to eighteen and the school years range from year 7 to year 13. It opened a Sixth Form in the year of 2015. It is located on the site of Finchley Manorhill School, which was progressively closed in the late 1980s. The buildings were reopened as The Compton School in 1992.

The school became a Beacon school in 1999, and was awarded Technology College status in 2001. It has recently become a training college as well. It has had three successive 'outstanding' OFSTED reports. Its exam results are satisfactory. In 2012 68% of the students achieved 5+ A*-C GCSE (and equivalent) including English and maths GCSEs. The school is also known for its links with Woodhouse College.

Compton School is a proper comprehensive school, selecting solely on grounds of proximity to the school.

Recently the school has undergone expansion, with millions of pounds invested in the buildings by the London Borough of Barnet.

== Notable former pupils ==
- Jamie Demetriou, comedian, actor, and screenwriter
- Richard Kruse, foil fencer and four-time Olympian
- Tyrese Hall, professional footballer
