= Woodhouse College =

Location
- Woodhouse Road; Finchley, London, N12 9EY; England
- Coordinates: 51°36′41″N 0°10′07″W

Information
- Type: Academy sixth form
- Local authority: London Borough of Barnet
- Trust: Frontier Learning Trust
- Department for Education URN: 148421 Tables
- Ofsted: Reports
- Principal: Sugra Alibhai
- Gender: Co-Educational
- Age: 16 to 18
- Enrolment: 1060 (2008/9)
- Website: www.woodhouse.ac.uk

Woodhouse College is a single site selective state sixth form centre situated between North Finchley and Friern Barnet on the eastern side of the London Borough of Barnet in North London, England. It was formerly a state grammar school, known as Woodhouse Grammar School.

== Admissions ==
The college caters mainly for full-time students aged 16 to 18 whose aim is to progress to higher education.

== History ==
=== Woodhouse Grammar School ===
After the First World War, the former residence of ornamental plasterer Thomas Collins (1735–1830) in the Woodhouse area of Finchley was reconstructed; the house became The Woodhouse School in 1923. A blue plaque commemorating Thomas Collins is on the wall outside the present college office. The school coat of arms with the motto 'Cheerfulness with Industry' is still displayed above the stage in the college hall.

During the Second World War, the school continued to function while the basement was used by the ARP service. The names of the forty-seven former pupils who died during WWII are recorded in a hand-illuminated Roll of Honour which hangs at the foot of the main staircase near the front entrance to the college. The Roll of Honour also records the names of the four houses of the old grammar school: Gordon, Livingstone, Nightingale and Scott.

=== Sixth Form ===
Woodhouse Grammar School was later reconstituted as Woodhouse Sixth Form College. There were plans to merge the school with Friern Barnet County Secondary School in 1971, but these were blocked by local MP Margaret Thatcher. Thatcher gave a speech at the college in May 1983.

In January 2021 Woodhouse College converted to academy status and is now part of the Frontier Learning Trust.

== Academic performance ==
The college achieves above average A-level results. Woodhouse College's 2022 results were 83% grades A* - B.

== Notable alumni ==
=== Woodhouse Grammar School ===
- Cyril Fletcher, comedian famous for his "odd odes"
- Giles Hart, engineer and trade union activist
- Ian Bedford, cricketer
- John Somerville, sculptor
- Oliver Postgate, animator and creator of Bagpuss
- Paul Davies, astrophysicist
- Robert G. W. Anderson, director of the British Museum
- Jagdip Jagpal, director of India Art Fair

=== Woodhouse Sixth Form College ===
- Daisy Edgar-Jones, actress
- Johann Hari, journalist and writer
- Julia Hartley-Brewer, journalist, broadcaster and presenter
- Naomie Harris, actress
- David Hirsh, sociologist
- Jesse Honey, Mastermind winner 2010 and World Quiz Champion 2012
- Michael McIntyre, stand-up comedian
- Ali Jawad, Paralympic powerlifter (silver medallist, Rio 2016)
- Robert Rinder, known as "Judge Rinder", barrister and television personality
- Stephen Bush, journalist
- Antigoni Buxton, Love Island participant and singer
