= C. V. Raju =

Toy maker from Andhra Pradesh

C.V. Raju
- Born: Chintalapati Venkatapathi Raju; 14 May 1963 (age 62); Jonnavalsa in Vizianagaram district, Andhra Pradesh
- Citizenship: India
- Occupation: Artisan
- Known for: Etikoppaka toys
- Awards: National Grassroots Innovation Award from National Innovation Foundation – India
- Honours: Padma Shri

C. V. Raju is an Indian toy maker and innovator from Etikoppaka in Anakapalli District of Andhra Pradesh, India. He is known for reviving the traditional art of making Etikoppaka toys, which has a geographical indication tag. He also made many vegetable-based dyes for Etikoppaka toys, and also developed new tools, techniques and methods to extend the shelf life of these dyes.

In 2003 Raju received 2nd Biennial National Grassroots Innovation and Outstanding Traditional Knowledge Award from National Innovation Foundation – India. He has also won the Centenary Award, the Seal of Excellence for Handicrafts from UNESCO and Lifetime Achievement Award from Indian National Trust for Art and Cultural Heritage. In 2023, he was awarded the Padma Shri by the Government of India.

== Biography ==
Chintalapati Venkatapathi Raju was born on 14 May 1963 in Jonnavalsa village in Vizianagaram district of Andhra Pradesh, India. He did his secondary education in Visakhapatnam and Vizianagaram, and completed his SSC in 1979. He then graduated with a degree in agriculture.

== Career ==
Raju is a maker of Etikoppaka toys, which has a geographical indication. When the popularity of these toys began to wane, in 1988, Raju decided to revive the 500-year-old craft. He sells these toys to many noted galleries in India. Since 1992, he has been exporting these toys to many foreign countries including European countries.

He strengthened the local tradition of making vegetable-based dyes for Etikoppaka toys, making them safe for children and worked to develop new tools, techniques and methods to extend the shelf life of these dyes. Attending workshops and training courses on making natural dyes for textiles, Raju explored dyes in plant roots, bark, stems, leaves, fruits and seeds. The Crafts Council of India helped Raju to test the toxicity of these dyes. His experiments led to the production of more than 12 natural dyes, including royal red and indigo.

Raju started Padmavati Associates, a co-operative society of artisans to increase the income of the artisans and ensure natural dyes reach the right market. Today, 160 artisans from the village are engaged in making the toy, and they produce around 30,000- 33,000 toys per month.

In 2017, Raju participated in the 4th Innovation Scholar-In-Residence programme at Rashtrapati Bhavan, Delhi. He has also participated in the annual Festival of Innovation and Entrepreneurship (FINE), organized by National Innovation Foundation and Department of Science and Technology under the aegis of Rashtrapati Bhawan.

== Awards and honors ==
In 2003 he received 2nd Biennial National Grassroots Innovation and Outstanding Traditional Knowledge Award from National Innovation Foundation – India, an autonomous body of the Department of Science and Technology, Government of India. He has also won the Centenary Award, the Seal of Excellence for Handicrafts from UNESCO and Lifetime Achievement Award from Indian National Trust for Art and Cultural Heritage. Indian Prime Minister Narendra Modi praised Raju's efforts in promoting the traditional toy industry in his 68th Mann Ki Baat radio program. In 2023, he was awarded the Padma Shri by the Government of India.

== Controversies ==
Raju faced objections from other toy makers after he told an NRI who bought toys from him that some artisans today use artificial colors containing lead, cadmium and barium in Etikoppaka toys. They said that his remarks would have a negative impact on the Etikoppaka toy market itself. Responding to the topic, Raju said that he is only concerned about the quality of the toy and if anyone wants to learn how to make natural dyes for toys, he will teach them.
