= Princess Pea (performance artist) =

Anonymous visual and performance artist

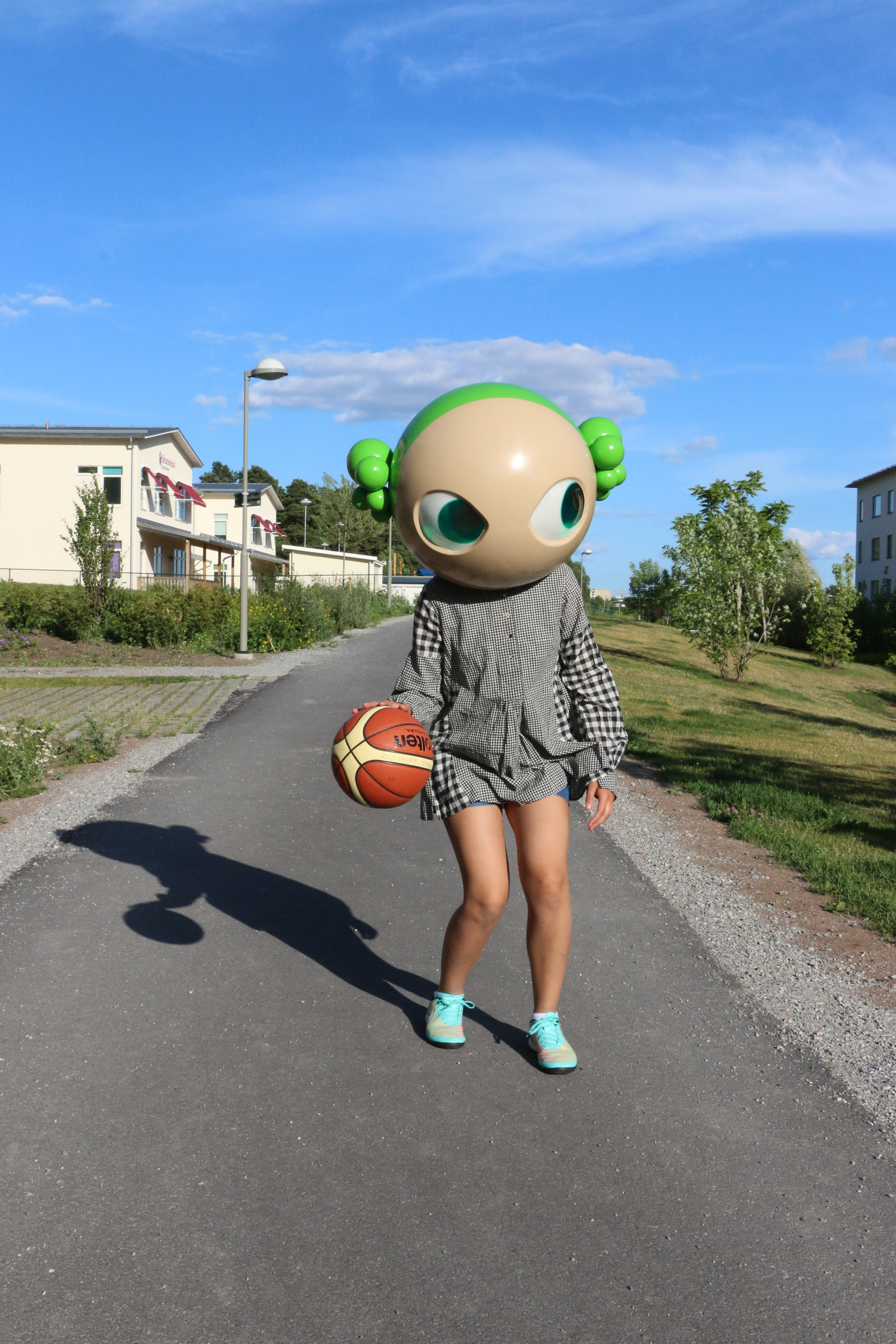
Princes pea in 2019

Princess Pea is an anonymous Gurgaon-based visual and performance artist. Identified by her large anime head, she pops up in various public places and events (such as art fairs), asking society to raise questions about identity and self-worth. She broke into the art scene in 2009 with her solo at the India Art Fair.

== Collaborations ==
In 2016 at the India Art Fair, she launched a limited edition of Etikopakka toys, made using soft wood and lacquer in the village of Etikoppaka.

Fashion brand Pero by fashion designer Aneeth Arora collaborated with the artist for Atlanta International Fashion Week in 2015. The association highlights the alter ego by creating Princess Pea costumes. She walked the ramp for the Lakme Fashion Week (summer/resort 2018).

Vague series by Princess Pea brings out digitally manipulated magazine covers in a satirical attempt.

Proxies by Princess Pea, in collaboration with Architectural Digest (Art Issue 2017) were a three-act play of performing life.
