= Angela Pack =

New Zealand periodontist (born 1943)

Angela Pack MNZM
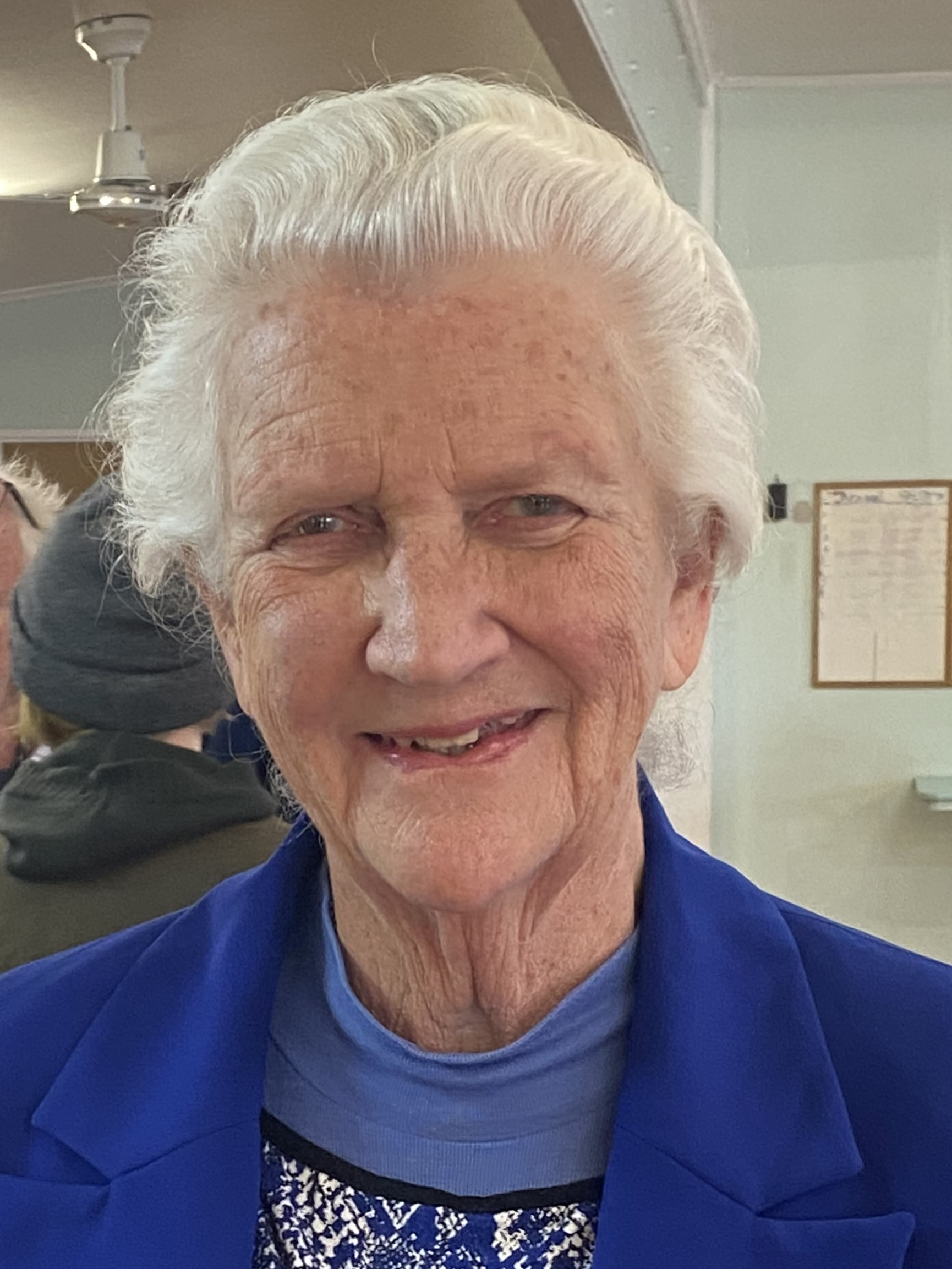
- Pack in 2025
- Born: 9 July 1943 (age 83); Edgware, London
- Awards: Alan Docking Award, Fellow of the New Zealand Dental Association, Order of Merit, Member of the New Zealand Order of Merit

Academic background
- Education: Royal Dental Hospital
- Thesis: The effect of protein deficiency on some aspects of skull growth, bone density and incisor tooth development in the rat (1976)
- Doctoral advisor: Raleigh Barclay Lucas

Angela Rosalind Creighton Pack MNZM (born 9 July 1943) is a New Zealand retired periodontist and academic. Pack trained in London before emigrating to New Zealand in 1972, where she joined the Department of Periodontology at the University of Otago. Pack advocated for women in the dental profession, and led the introduction of dental hygienists to New Zealand. Pack was the first woman president of the Australia and New Zealand Division of the International Association for Dental Research. She was the first female fellow of the New Zealand Dental Association, and was awarded honours by the IADR and the Australian and New Zealand Academy of Periodontology.

== Early life and education ==
Pack was born in 1943 in Edgware, England. Her parents were both teachers, and she was an only child. Pack says she became interested in becoming a surgeon after being allowed to examine discarded herring heads in her mother's kitchen. At the age of twelve, Pack spent a week observing her uncle, a dentist with a practice in Yorkshire, performing extractions, anaesthesia and restorations. She set her mind on becoming a dentist. Pack attended Copthall County Girls Grammar School, but the focus on arts led her to transfer to Woodhouse Grammar School, where her father was the Senior Master, in order to study science. Pack excelled at school and was awarded a Major County Award to have her fees and living expenses paid at university.

Pack completed a Bachelor of Dental Surgery (BDS) at the Royal Dental Hospital in London, beginning her studies in 1960, the youngest of nine women in a class of 48 students. In her second year, Pack studied periodontology, which was at that time a relatively new subject. Pack worked as a volunteer Clinical Assistant Lecturer in her final year, and was awarded several prizes during her degree. She graduated BDS in 1964 with Honours in Clinical Dentistry. After graduation in 1964, Pack worked as a NHS dentist and then in oral surgery at the Royal Dental Hospital and the University College Dental School. Preferring academic work and hospital dentistry to general practice, Pack pursued further qualifications in order to compete in a male-dominated profession. She gained her Licentiate in Dental Surgery from the Royal College of Surgeons of England in 1965, and then from 1969 spent three years as a lecturer in periodontology and an oral pathology research assistant at the Royal Dental Hospital, supervised by Rayleigh Lucas. When her appointment ended, Pack applied for a position as Senior Lecturer in the department but was disappointed to miss out. She then applied for a position as lecturer in periodontology at the University of Otago in New Zealand, for which she was interviewed over lunch in a London pub by an Otago professor on sabbatical leave, oral pathologist Alister Smillie. Although her PhD was not yet completed, Pack had finished her experimental work and left for New Zealand in March 1972, taking with her a new Austin 1300 given by her parents.

== Career ==
Arriving at Otago in April, Pack joined the Department of Periodontology, which had three academic staff, headed by Associate Professor Alan Laws. She was the only woman teaching clinical dentistry, and there were only five women clinical students. Pack developed a new undergraduate periodontology course using closed circuit television, and recorded teaching videos on gingivectomies and apically repositioned flaps.

She returned to London to defend her PhD thesis during her first sabbatical, after five years' at Otago. She completed her PhD on the effects of protein deficiency on tooth development at the Royal Dental Hospital, graduating in absentia in 1977. Pack took the opportunity to tour periodontal departments in America, Canada and Scandinavia, and was elected as a member of the American Academy of Periodontology.

In 1973 only 2.5% of registered dentists in New Zealand were women. The proportion of women gradually increased to the point that the Dental Faculty were concerned about the possible impacts on the profession of women leaving to get married or have children. Pack was asked to research the issue, and presented a paper at the 1981 NZ Dental Association conference. She described many cases of discrimination against women from their male colleagues, and published papers on the treatment of women dentists.

As a periodontist, Pack believed in the importance of dental hygienists, but their introduction required changes to the 1984 Dental Act. Pack advocated for changes to the Act, but a 1989 amendment did not use the word 'hygienist' and, although it allowed for 'auxiliary' dental workers, it did not prescribe their training. Pack chaired an NZDA committee to devise a training course for hygienists, which was presented to the NZDA Board in 1990. When the Board prevaricated, Pack asked them why they were "behaving like a load of lily-livered chickens". The vote went her way, and eventually a dental hygienist training curriculum was adopted by the NZQA in 1992. Unable to persuade the Dean of the Dental School, Martin Kean, to introduce training for hygienists, Pack arranged for the Otago Polytechnic to take on the work, with the first dental hygienists graduating in 1995.

Pack published more than a hundred papers, and was co-editor with Hubert Neuman of the book Periodontal Needs of Developing Nations, published in 1996. Her research covered folate mouthwashes, oral hygiene techniques, the effects of smoking on periodontal disease and the development of a sheep model for Guided Tissue Regeneration. Pack was promoted to Associate Professor at the university in 1986, and was head of department in 1993.

=== Service ===
In 1997 Pack was elected as the first female President of the ANZ Division of the International Association for Dental Research (IADR; now the International Association for Dental, Oral, and Craniofacial Research). Pack was a founding member of the Asian Pacific Society of Periodontology, served as president of the NZ Society of Periodontology for two years from 1990, and was elected to the board of the International Academy of Periodontology in 1999, serving as president from 2003 to 2005.

Pack was editor of the Journal of the New Zealand Society of Periodontology from 1982 until 2004. She served on the editorial boards of a number of journals, including the International Journal of Periodontal Clinical Investigations, the Journal of Dental Research, the Journal of Aesthetic Dentistry, the Indian Journal of Dental Research, and the Journal of the International Academy of Periodontology.

Pack retired from the university as an associate professor after thirty years, and worked as a Visiting Professor at the University of the South Pacific in Fiji. In 2005 she opened a practice in Nelson with her daughter, from which she retired in 2012.

== Awards and recognition ==
In the 2001 Queen's Birthday Honours, Pack was appointed a Member of the New Zealand Order of Merit, for services to dentistry. The same year, she received the Alan Docking Science Award from the IADR, and was elected as the first female fellow of the New Zealand Dental Association. In 2024 Pack was awarded the Australian and New Zealand Academy of Periodontology's Order of Merit.

== Personal life ==
Pack married John Barker in 1978, and the couple have a daughter. She moved to Golden Bay / Mohua in 2005. As of 2025, she lives in Patons Rock. Pack's hobbies include choral singing, country dancing and gardening.

== Selected works ==
- Helen K P English; Pack, Angela; Molan, Peter (2004). "The effects of manuka honey on plaque and gingivitis: a pilot study". Journal of the International Academy of Periodontology. 6 (2): 63–67. PMID 15125017. Wikidata Q80046705.
- Thomson, Murray William; Hashim R; Pack, Angela (2000). "The prevalence and intraoral distribution of periodontal attachment loss in a birth cohort of 26-year-olds". Journal of Periodontology. 71 (12): 1840–1845. doi:10.1902/jop.2000.71.12.1840. PMID 11156040. Wikidata Q61955647.
- M E Thomson; Pack, Angela (1982). "Effects of extended systemic and topical folate supplementation on gingivitis of pregnancy". Journal of Clinical Periodontology. 9 (3): 275–280. doi:10.1111/j.1600-051x.1982.tb02067.x. PMID 7047579. Wikidata Q70247607.
- Pack, Angela; L J Coxhead; B W McDonald (1990). "The prevalence of overhanging margins in posterior amalgam restorations and periodontal consequences". Journal of Clinical Periodontology. 17 (3): 145–152. doi:10.1111/j.1600-051x.1990.tb01078.x. PMID 2319001. Wikidata Q68739682.
- Pack, Angela; Thomson ME (1980). "Effects of topical and systemic folic acid supplementation on gingivitis in pregnancy". Journal of Clinical Periodontology. 7 (5): 402–414. doi:10.1111/j.1600-051x.1980.tb02013.x. PMID 7007454. Wikidata Q51657765.
- Pack, Angela (1995). "Hygienists and their role in dental practice". New Zealand Dental Journal. 91 (404): 57–61. PMID 7675348. Wikidata Q72060310.
- Pack, Angela (1984). "The hygienist issue: do dental practitioners want them in New Zealand?". New Zealand Dental Journal. 80 (362): 127–130. PMID 6594621. Wikidata Q70964720.
- Pack, Angela (1981). "Attitudes of male dental practitioners towards female dentists in New Zealand". New Zealand Dental Journal. 77 (350): 150–153. PMID 6947157. Wikidata Q72026040.
- Pack, Angela (1981). "Women in New Zealand dentistry, 1880-1980". New Zealand Dental Journal. 77 (347): 19–25. PMID 7015196. Wikidata Q70149700.
