= Meera Thakur =

Crafter

Meera Thakur from Bihar in India practices and teaches sikki grass craft. She has received the Seal of Excellence for Handicrafts from UNESCO and the Nari Shakti Puraskar.

== Career ==
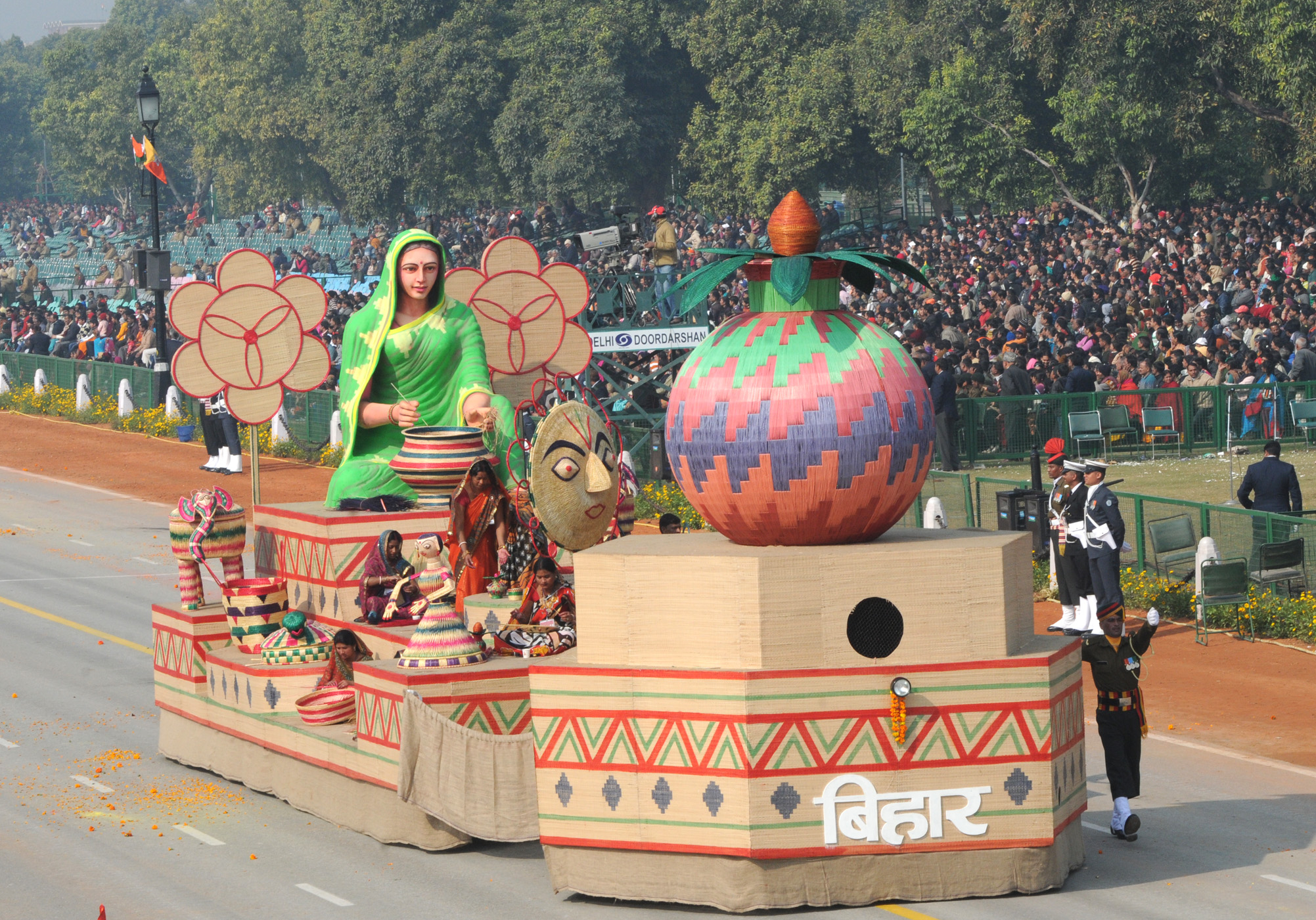
A float made out of sikki grass

Meera Thakur was born in Umri, Madhubani in Bihar, India. At the age of four she started to learn sikki grass craft from her mother, making adornments, vases and boxes. Sikki is a grass only found in Bihar and Uttar Pradesh, which gives a golden fibre. Thakur lives in Madhubani, where she runs Hastakala Vikas Kendra, an organization which trains disadvantaged women in craftwork. It has set up the Folk Art Handicraft Training Centre.

== Awards and recognition ==
The Delhi Crafts Council gave Thakur the Bal Shilpi Artist award in 1988 and she received the Seal of Excellence for Handicrafts from UNESCO in 2005. She was presented with the Nari Shakti Puraskar on International Women's Day 2022.
