= Sikki grass craft =

Woven objects

Sikki grass handicrafts

Sikki grass crafts are various handicrafts that are made from a special kind of grass known as sikki found in the Mithilanchal of India and Nepal. The art of making items from sikki grass is an ancient one .

== History ==
Tharu women in the southern plains of Nepal have been weaving traditional baskets from sikki grass for centuries. Nowadays, many Tharu women are engaged in producing sikki handicrafts through collaborative networks. Dhakiyas which are also known as Mauni, Daliya depending upon the place are baskets made from sikki or moonj grass plays an important role in everyday household activities of the Tharu community. Dhakiya has been used in every rituals of Tharu community from the birth to death.

== Procedure ==
Sikki is dried and the flower head is cut off. The resulting fine golden fibre is used in weaving to make toys, dolls, and baskets (dolchi). Items are sometimes painted.

Boxes made of sikki known as pauti are given to daughters by parents on the occasion of their wedding. The boxes are used to hold sindoor, ornaments, and jewellery.

== Famous Artists ==
Meera Thakur in India practices and teaches sikki grass craft. She has received the Seal of Excellence for Handicrafts from UNESCO and the Nari Shakti Puraskar.
