= Woodhouse Grammar School =

Former school in London, England

Coordinates: 51.6115°N 0.1686°W

Woodhouse Grammar School was a secondary school in Woodhouse Road, North Finchley, in the London Borough of Barnet. (There was another Woodhouse Grammar School, in the village of Woodhouse, near Sheffield, founded in 1909, closed in the 1960s, absorbed into Aston High. The old building was demolished.)

The North Finchley school took in new pupils from 1944 to 1978 at which time the final intake of first years entered and it was called Woodhouse College. There was then a five-year transition period while the existing school pupils worked their way through year groups, with a gradual increase in lower sixth intake from other schools.

== The building ==
The first mention of buildings on the site of Woodhouse Grammar School is in 1655, in the probate of the will of Allen Bent of Friern Barnet. The will, dated 15 January 1655, refers to three tenements "called 'The Woodhouses' that are now in the several occupations of William Moore, William Amery and Abraham Wager".

In 1743 James Patterson, a turner, of the Parish of St George the Martyr in Middlesex came into possession of "all those two messuages called or known as the Woodhouses with one ground room under the said messuages". These two tenements came into the possession of Thomas Collins through his wife on the death of her father James Patterson in 1765; "James Patterson bequeaths his tenements in Finchley to his daughter Henrietta Collins, wife of Thomas Collins" according to the Gentleman’s Magazine 2 November 1827. They had married on 19 November 1761. The third tenement was in the possession of John Bateman, a wine merchant, who in The List of Finchley Freeholders lives at "Woodhouses". In his will, proved in 1776, he orders his executors to sell his house and gardens as soon as possible; and it was sold in 1778 to John Johnson who in 1784 transferred it to Thomas Collins; this is described as "one of the messuages one of the Woodhouses". Thomas Collins became possessor of all three Woodhouses.

By 1754 at least one of the buildings was called Wood House as seen on John Rocque’s Map of Middlesex. A mansion was built there between 1784 and 1798, becoming the centre of an estate created at the inclosure of Finchley Common. At the inclosure in 1816, the Marquis of Buckingham and Sir William Curtiss, major local landlords, were allocated 45 acres and 39 acres respectively. Thomas Collins bought both their allocations.

A blue plaque commemorating Thomas Collins hangs on a wall outside the present college office (see picture).

On the death of Thomas Collins in 1830, Woodhouse passed to his great niece Margaret Collins Jennings. There was a marriage settlement between Margaret Collins Jennings of Finchley and William Lambert Esq. of Monmouth which included Wood Houses in Finchley and much other property. They were married on 23 September 1830. William Lambert was a J.P. for Middlesex. Sometime between 1841 and 1860 the separate house was pulled down. From the census returns, in 1841 William Lambert (aged 40) and his wife Margaret (aged 35) were living at Wood Houses (one house occupied and 2 uninhabited) – his occupation was given as independent. The house and estate was then sold to G W Wright-Ingle whose family came from St Ives in Huntingdonshire. Wright-Ingle reconstructed and enlarged the house in 1889 employing the architect E W Robb of St Ives. The down pipes were still marked 1889 when last inspected in 2012. From the plans the lobby and the front and back rooms of the west end of the house were not rebuilt. G W Wright Ingle’s wife had a daughter at Wood House on 27 September 1891 according to the London Standard dated 1 October 1891.

In 1910 the house came into the possession of the Busvine family according to Percy Reboul (1994). Middlesex County Council agreed to buy the house in 1915 but only "when peace was restored" which unfortunately meant that the building suffered some neglect before becoming a school in 1922.

== The school ==
The school was opened as The Woodhouse School in 1922 by Middlesex County Council, becoming Woodhouse Grammar School following the Education Act 1944. It remained as a fully state-funded grammar school until it closed in 1978 and re-opened as a state sixth form college (Woodhouse College).

The change was triggered by the introduction of the Education Act 1976, which effectively killed off grammar schools in favour of non-selective comprehensives. The then Conservative Member of Parliament for Finchley, Margaret Thatcher, (later to become prime minister) was Education Secretary in the Conservative government from 1970 to 1974 and a vocal supporter of grammar schools during a time of rising support for a change to non-selection at age 11. However, when the Labour government was elected in 1974 and passed the Education Act 1976, the writing was on the wall for Woodhouse.

As the newly-elected Leader of Her Majesty's Opposition, Mrs Thatcher continued to oppose the move to comprehensives and rejected plans for Woodhouse to merge with the local secondary modern school to create the "Friern Barnet & Woodhouse Comprehensive School". Her opposition ensured that the school retained its selective status, albeit as a sixth-form college.

== Motto and houses ==
The school motto was "Cheerfulness with Industry".

The names of the forty-seven former pupils who died during the Second World War are recorded in a hand illuminated Roll of Honour which hangs at the foot of the main staircase near the front entrance to the existing college.

The Roll of Honour also records the names of the four houses of the old grammar school. There were four school houses, each with a designated colour - Gordon (yellow), Livingstone (green), Nightingale (blue) and Scott (red), remembering the historical British hero-figures of General Gordon, David Livingstone, Florence Nightingale and Robert Falcon Scott. The original school song celebrates the motto and the four houses, and starts "By field and track, by pitch and court, / Hygiea beckons active youth". The chorus was:

"Gordon, Livingstone, Nightingale and Scott,
Cheerfulness with industry,
Woodhouse!"

== The Dennis Whitaker years – 1969 to 1982 ==
Under the leadership of Dennis Whitaker (1918–2011) the Headmaster from 1969 to 1982, Woodhouse Grammar School became a sixth-form college. "It was his mission to make sure that the students went away feeling as good as any pupil at the grammar school," said his daughter.

== Arthur King ==
The Headmaster previous to Mr Whitaker was Mr Arthur W. King.

== Notable alumni ==
- Robert G. W. Anderson, scientist and director of the British Museum
- Ian Bedford, cricketer
- Paul Davies, astrophysicist
- Cyril Fletcher, comedian famous for his "odd odes"
- David Hirsh, sociologist
- Giles Hart, British engineer and trade union activist
- Angela Pack, periodontist
- Oliver Postgate, English animator and creator of Bagpuss
- John Somerville, sculptor

== Gallery ==
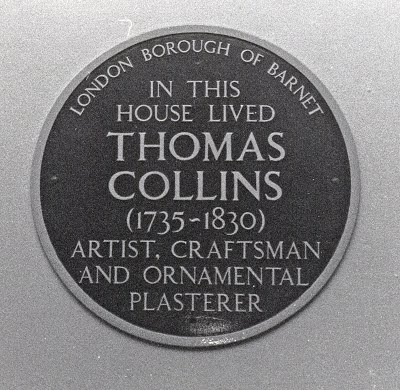
The plaque which hangs on the 1st floor of the new college

Crest of the Woodhouse School

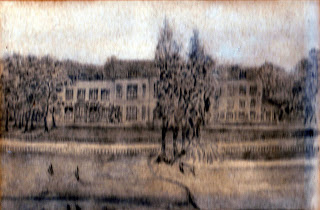
The Woodhouse School

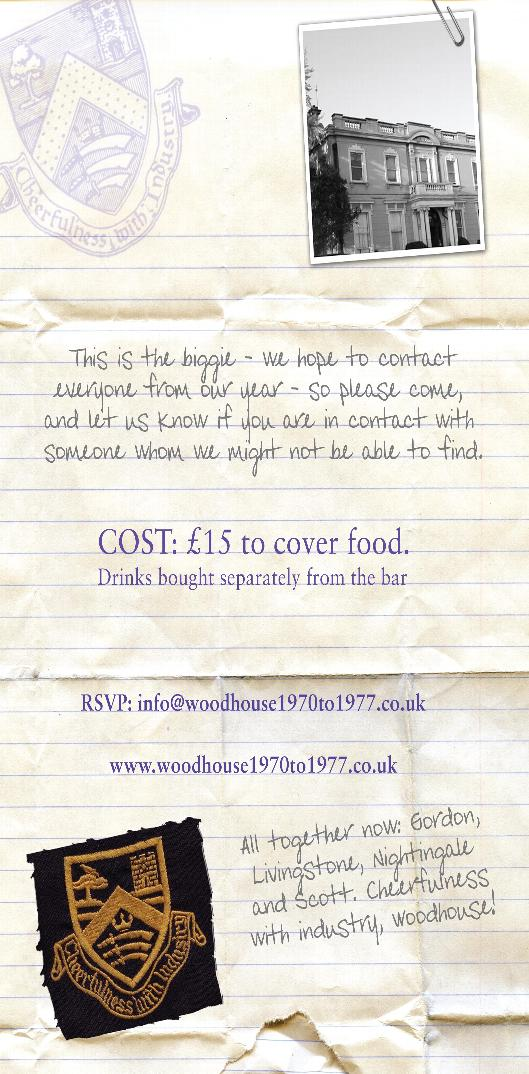
Invite to Woodhouse School

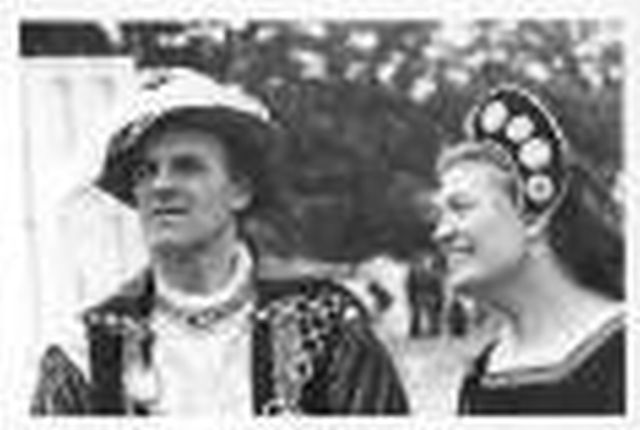
Mr Whitaker - School Pageant 1975

Prefect's Badge

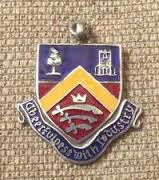
Prefect's Badge, missing the attachment
