= Copthall School =

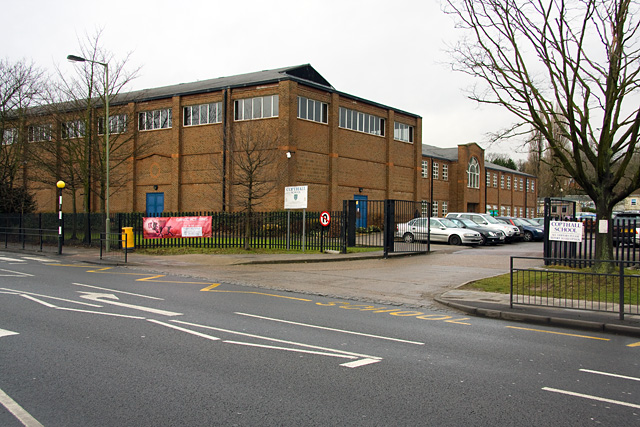

Location
- Pursley Road; Mill Hill, Greater London, NW7 2EP; England
- 51°36′31″N 0°13′56″W

Information
- Type: Academy
- Department for Education URN: 138685 Tables
- Ofsted: Reports
- Gender: Girls
- Age: 11 to 18
- Houses: cpt/hal
- Website: http://www.copthallschool.org.uk/

Copthall School (formerly Copthall County Grammar School) is a girls' secondary school and sixth form located in the Mill Hill area of the London Borough of Barnet, England.

The school was formed in 1973 by the amalgamation of Copthall County Grammar School and Woodcroft Secondary Modern. The original 1930s grammar school building has been joined to a new wing of equal size. A new library opened in 1999 and the school received an excellence award from the DfES in 2001.

The school was converted to academy status in October 2012, and was previously a community school under the direct control of Barnet London Borough Council. The school continues to coordinate with Barnet London Borough Council for admissions.

Copthall School offers GCSEs, City and Guilds qualifications and ESOL courses as programmes of study for pupils. Students in the sixth form have the option to study a range of A Levels.

== Notable former pupils ==
=== Copthall County Grammar School ===
- Alison Dunhill, artist and art historian
- Miriam Kochan, writer and translator
- Ann McPherson, GP, author and health campaigner
- Victoria Miro, art dealer and gallerist
- Angela Pack, periodontist
- Sue Platt, 1962 Commonwealth Javelin gold

=== Copthall School ===
- Ann Akinjirin, actress and theatre maker
- Temi Fagbenle, basketball player
