= Polish Solidarity Campaign =

UK-based left-wing solidarity campaign

Britain's Polish Solidarity Campaign (PSC) was a UK-based campaign in solidarity with Solidarity (the Solidarność trade union) and other democratic forces in Poland. It was founded in August 1980 by Robin Blick, Karen Blick, and Adam Westoby, and continued its activities into the first half of the 1990s. The campaign was not named after Polish Solidarity (of whose name the founders became aware only later on); rather, it was inspired by the Chile Solidarity Campaign and the Vietnam Solidarity Campaign.

== Founding and early membership ==
Founded in 1980, most of the PSC's early members were ex-Communists, trade unionists and Labour Party supporters as well as left wing Polish exiles, including members of the Polish Socialist Party In Exile, and the main campaign centred on gaining support for Solidarnosc from British trade union movement. Founding members were Robin Blick, Karen Blick, and Adam Westoby. Within the first year, PSC had become a mainstream movement of support for Solidarnosc bringing together Polish born and British supporters from a wide spectrum of opinions. Some trade union branches, became affiliated as well, especially from NALGO and EETPU. In 1982, the group managed to resist a takeover attempt by the Trotskyist International Marxist Group (IMG).

== Opposition ==
The campaign met with opposition from the Communist Party and some within the Labour Party. The PSC called for British trade unions to cut their links with state-run trade unions in Eastern bloc countries, a demand which was resisted by the IMG. It also called on the Labour Party to discontinue its policy of inviting Eastern bloc Communist Party members as delegates to the annual Labour Party Conference. (At a 1981 meeting of the Labour National Executive Committee, only three people supported changing this policy. In 1982, following the imposition of Martial Law, and after strong lobbying from PSC members Naomi Hyamson and Wiktor Moszczynski, a narrow majority on the Executive voted to discontinue the invitations. PSC organized several public meetings in London addressed by Labour MPs such as Neil Kinnock, Ken Weetch and Phillip Whitehead.

After the PSC picketed a TUC meeting in February 1981, the TUC International Committee agreed to support Solidarność and began to send assistance. Afterwards, the PSC and the Committee enjoyed good relations, and Solidarność delegates began to get invited to TUC conferences, while PSC members acted as links, keeping up a steady exchange of information between British unions and Solidarnosc regional bodies by telex.

In April 1981, a march in support of Solidarność was organized by the Hands Off Polish Workers campaign, a group linked to the Labour leadership of the Greater London Council. The PSC participated, but was uneasy about the ban on "Cold War slogans". Giles Hart, official historian of the PSC, argued: "If this meant anything, it seemed to mean that one could say 'hands off Polish workers' but one could not say anything about whose hands were threatening Polish workers." Nevertheless, a Communist counterdemonstration also took place.

== Martial law era ==
After the imposition of martial law by General Jaruzelski on December 13, 1981, PSC members picketed the Polish Embassy with the use of hunger sit ins. On December 20 PSC organized a mass demonstration in Hyde Park, attended by over 14,000 people, including members of the |Polish community and British organizations across a very wide spectrum from Conservative Associations to Communist Party beanches, and were addressed by Polish community leaders Labour and Liberal MPs, a Conservative MEP, trade unionist, members of the European Nuclear Disarmament movement and the Mujahedeen, as well as Czech speakers. Immediately afterwards, A splinter group, Solidarity With Solidarity (SWS), was formed by Tadek Jarski, who chaired the mass meeting.

After martial law PSC developed into a mass movement of more than 2,000 paid up members, with a campaign budget exceeding £25,000 with affiliated branches in Birmingham, Manchester, Glasgow, Wyre Forest, Cambridge, Nottingham, Brighton and other cities. A number of PSC members came from other East European communities, especially Czech, Hungarian and Latvian.It organized regular public events and demonstrations every December to commemorate Martial Law, and August to commemorate the birth of Solidarnosc. Its funds had been built up by the diligent work of Giles Hart who had organized the sale of Solidarnosc badges, T-shirts and sweatshirts for which PSC got good publicity after Labour MP Eric Heffer and Conservative MP Sir George Young were seen to wear one. PSC were able to send funds to the underground movement in Poland.

PSC set up their own regular bulletin, called PSC News, which had 12 issues.PSC members Jacek Rostowski and Wanda Koscia assisted in setting up the Solidarnosc Working Group, headed initially by Artur Swiergiel and Andzzej Lodynski, and later by Marek Garztecki which consisted of Solidarnosc members who happened to be in the UK when martial law was declared. Together with PSC they visited trade union branches throughout the country to maximize support for Solidarnosc from fellow UK trade unionists.

== Support for Polish refugees ==
Giles Hart and Nina Ozols initiated the Polish Refugee Rights Group which organized material assistance for Polish workers and students in the UK.

== Dissolution ==
PSC continued organizing events and demonstrations up until 1989 and in that year they encouraged members of the Polish community to participate in the first Polish partially democratic elections to the Polish Senate and Sejm in that year. It ceased as an organization in 1990, after Poland had held its first fully democratic elections. Former members still meet and organize events and picnics.

== Chairmen ==
PSC Chairmen were: Karen Blick 1980–1982, Wiktor Moszczynski 1982–1983, Walter Kendall 1983–1984, Ryszard Stepan 1984–1985, Giles Hart 1985–1988, Marek Garztecki 1988–1989, Giles Hart 1989–1990.
