= Missing Link Trust =

Indian public awareness campaign

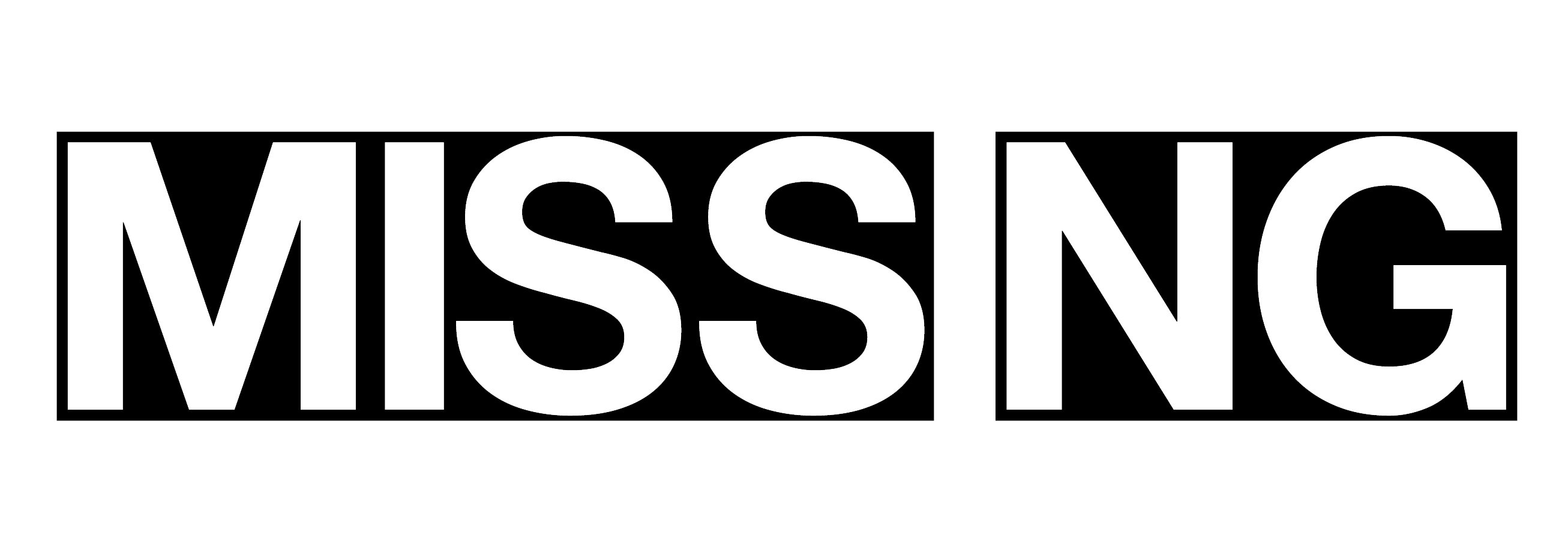
- Founded: 2014
- Founder: Leena Kejriwal
- Type: 12A, 80G
- Purpose: Raising awareness on sex trafficking
- Location: 73 Bentinck Street, Kolkata-700001, India
- Region served: India
- Website: Official website

Missing Link Trust is a nonprofit organization that uses art and educational campaigns to raise awareness and prevent child sex trafficking. Their work includes public sculpture installations, stencil campaigns, the interactive video game Missing: Game for a Cause, and the interactive online comic Web of Deceit - A missing and trafficking casefile. The organization was awarded the 2021 Stop Slavery Campaigns Award from the Thomson Reuters Foundation.

== Objective ==
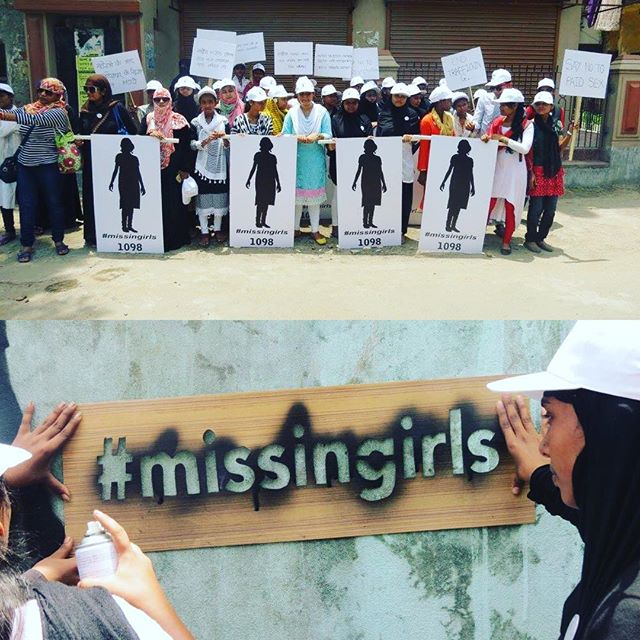
NGO's collaborating with MISSING for the stencil project

The mission of the organization is "to combine art and technology in creating mass awareness amongst the public, through innovative ways, leading to prevention of sex trafficking."

Missing is a four-part public awareness campaign. It tackles the first P of the United Nations Global Initiative to Fight Human Trafficking four P strategy on anti-trafficking, prevention through advocacy and awareness.

== Operations ==
Missing has operations in 6 countries Including India, United States, UK, Germany, Sudan, Tanzania. Missing has worked with NGOs and organizations including the Rotary Teach Programme, Yes Foundation, Rotaractors, iPartner India, Women and Child Development Ministry, iVolunteer, Association for the Promotion of Social Change (APSA), Jamghat, Nedan Foundation, Paint Our World, Pardada Pardadi Educational Society (PPES), Prerana, RAHAT, STOP, Udayan Care, and Vatsalya.

== History ==
As a photographer, Leena Kejriwal became motivated to raise awareness about the prevalence of sex trafficking in India. When she first started working with NGOs like Hamari Muskan and New Light as an artist, she created complicated installations within gallery spaces on the subject. Kejriwal began working in Kalighat with Rotary International as a volunteer in 2007 and wrote the book Kolkata Repossessing the City, which later developed into art exhibitions. After gallery exhibitions did not reach a wide audience, Kejriwal decided to develop public art installations to raise awareness. Kejriwal founded the Missing Link organization in 2014.

== Public art installations ==
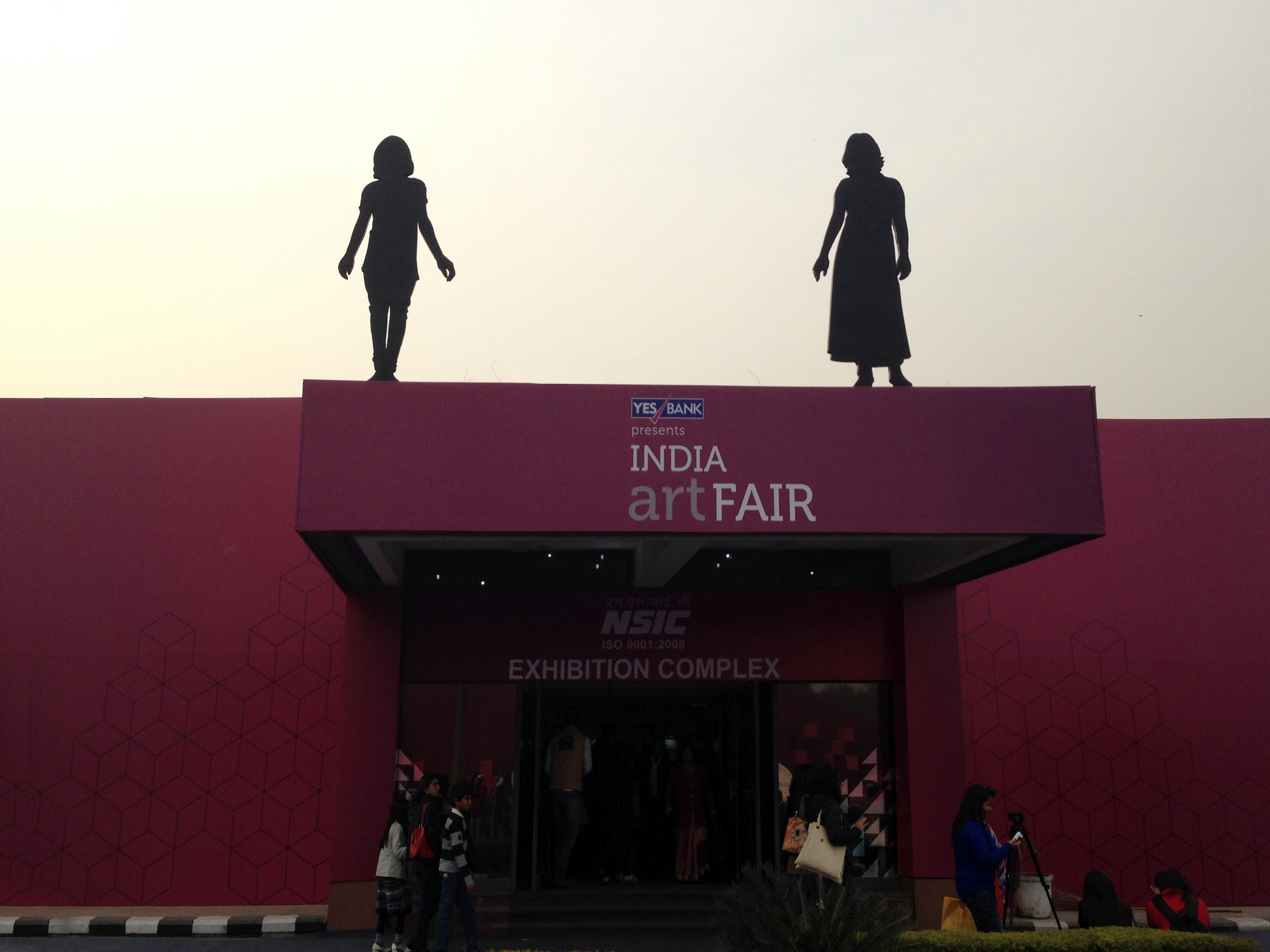
Black silhouettes of young girls placed against the urban skyline

In January 2014, the installation M.I.S.S.I.N.G. was shown outdoors at the India Art Fair, consisting of three female figures cut from steel and painted black to reflect the gender gap in India, described by Kejriwal as "like sharp, black holes cut out of the sky. Holes into which millions of girls disappear from the face of this earth."

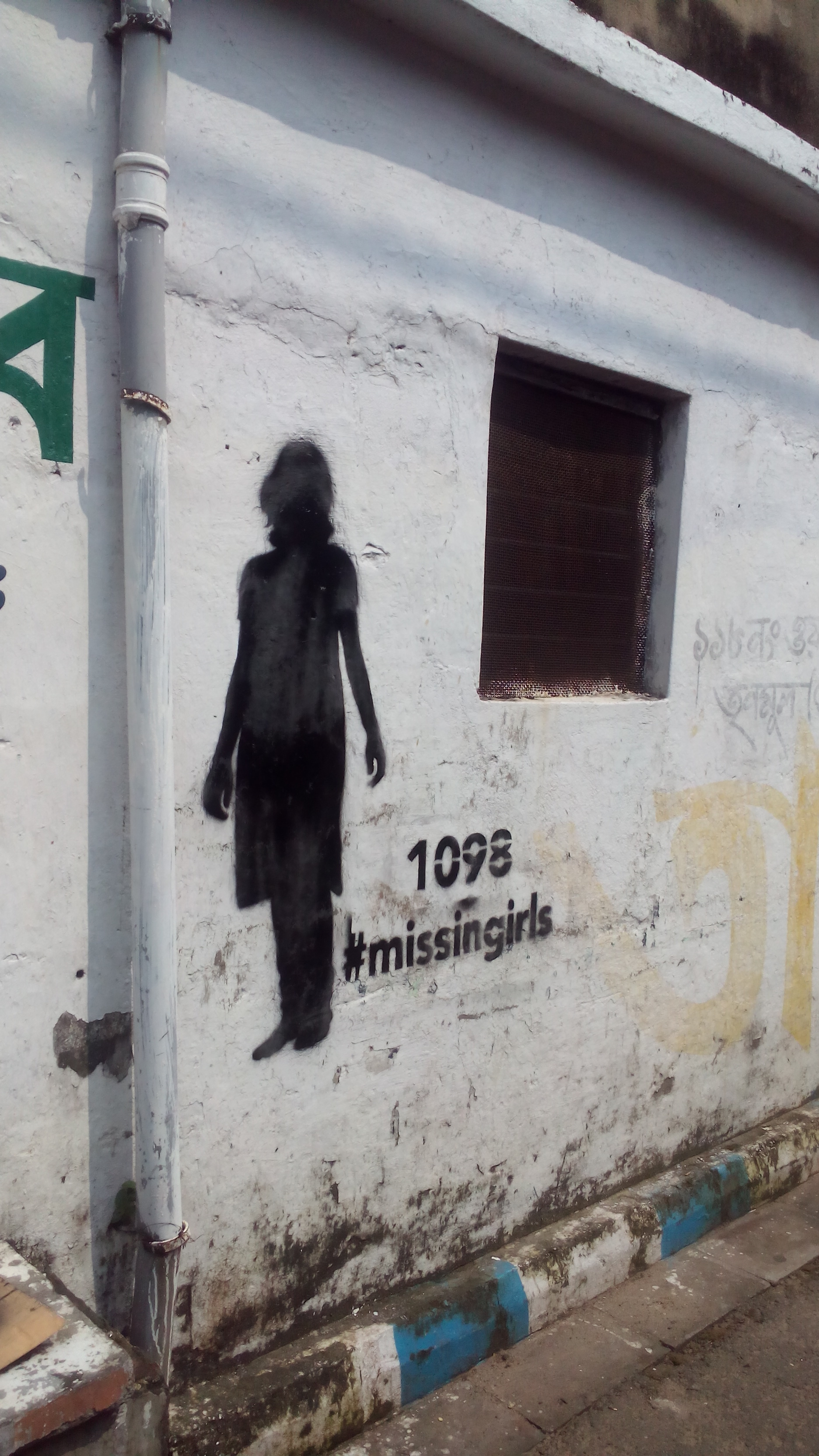
The Missing Stencil

In 2015, the M.I.S.S.I.N.G. project expanded into a nationwide public art installation, with stencils used to spraypaint black silhouettes of girls in cities including Bangalore, Delhi and Chennai to raise awareness about the estimated tens of thousands of girls that disappear each year and over a million children working in the sex industry in India. Kejriwal used crowdfunding to help raise money to expand the project. The NGOs Apne Aap and Hamari Muskan collaborated in the stencil campaign in West Bengal.

The organization launched a website, Savemissinggirls.com, with downloadable stencil kits featuring silhouettes of girls and an emergency government helpline number (1098) for children.

The sculpture project expanded with support from Sangita Jindal and the JSW Foundation, and a smartphone app was created to provide viewers with more information and links to NGOs working to prevent child trafficking. In 2018, the project included sculptures throughout Kolkata.

There are more than 5000 project stencils across villages and cities in India. Missing's stencil projects are in 17 cities, including Anupshahr, Bengaluru, Berlin, Chennai, Delhi, Dodoma, Goa, Jaipur, Kishanganj, Khartoum, Kokrajjar, Kolkata, Los Angeles, London, Mumbai, Pune and Salt Lake City.

In 2021, filmmaker Miriam Chandy Menacherry released a documentary titled From the Shadows that features survivors of child trafficking. Menacherry began work on the film five years prior, after seeing the #missing stencil art and finding Kejriwal.

== Missing: Game for a Cause ==
In 2016, Missing: Game for a Cause was distributed as a free interactive game for mobile and PC to raise awareness about the experiences of child victims of sex trafficking. Kejriwal developed the game with Flying Robot Studios in Kolkata, India. By 2017, the team was developing a role-playing game version, Missing: The Complete Saga, and raising money on Kickstarter to expand the development team. The team raised $50,795 on Kickstarter to develop the game.

The game is intended for a mature audience, and aims to expose the player to the dark world of human trafficking and raise awareness about it. The game developer Satyajit Chakraborty travelled with Kejriwal to different red light districts in Kolkata and to rural Bengal to better understand the issue.

By 2021, MISSING: Game for a Cause had over a million downloads between 70 countries.

== Web of Deceit - A missing and trafficking casefile ==
Missing Link Trust worked jointly with International Justice Mission to develop a mobile app for Android devices titled "Web of Deceit - A missing and trafficking casefile" that was released in 2021. The app is an interactive comic designed to educate people about human trafficking and resources to get help. The comic features a young woman as the main character and includes information about legal rights.

== Educational campaigns ==
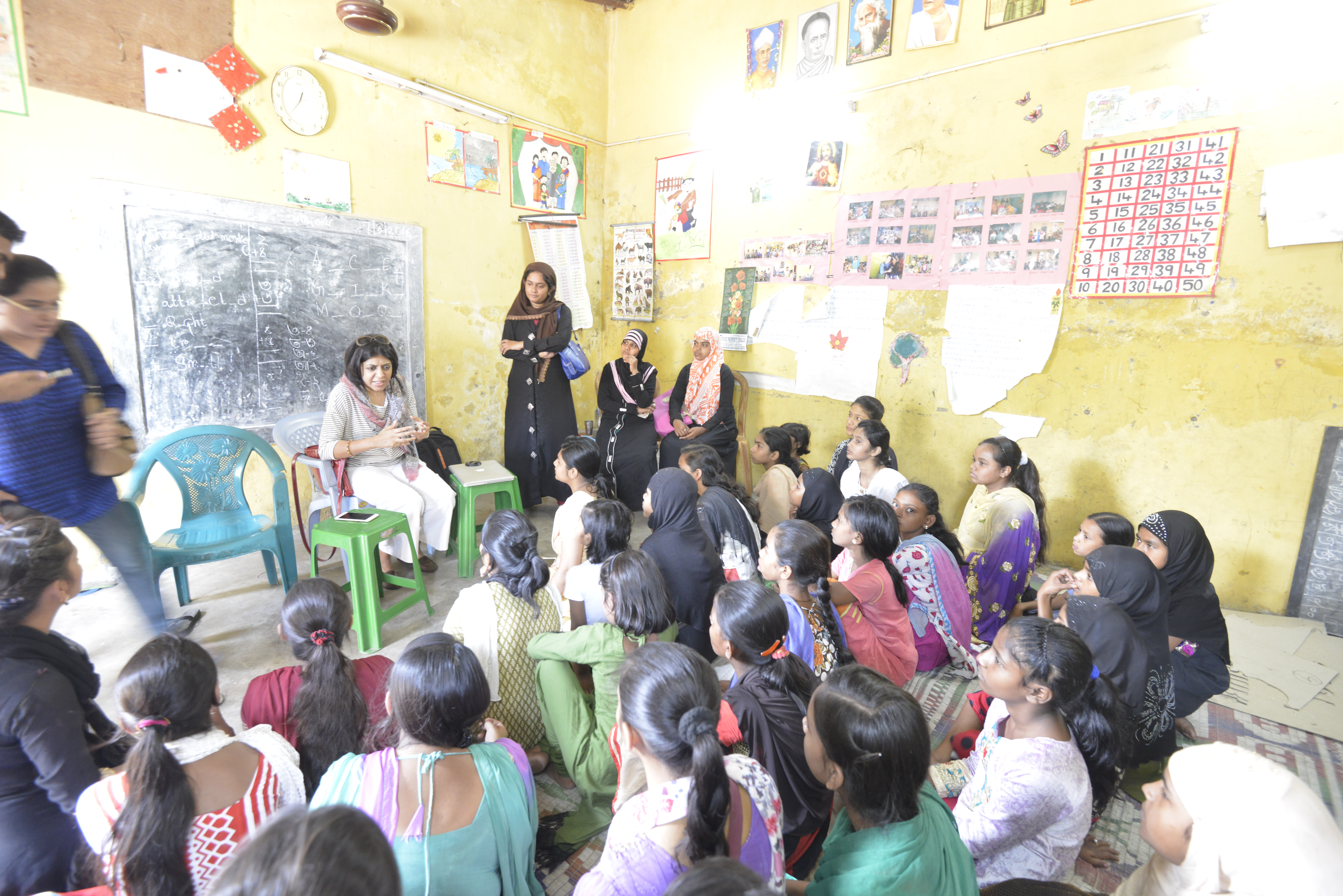
Educating the students about Human trafficking

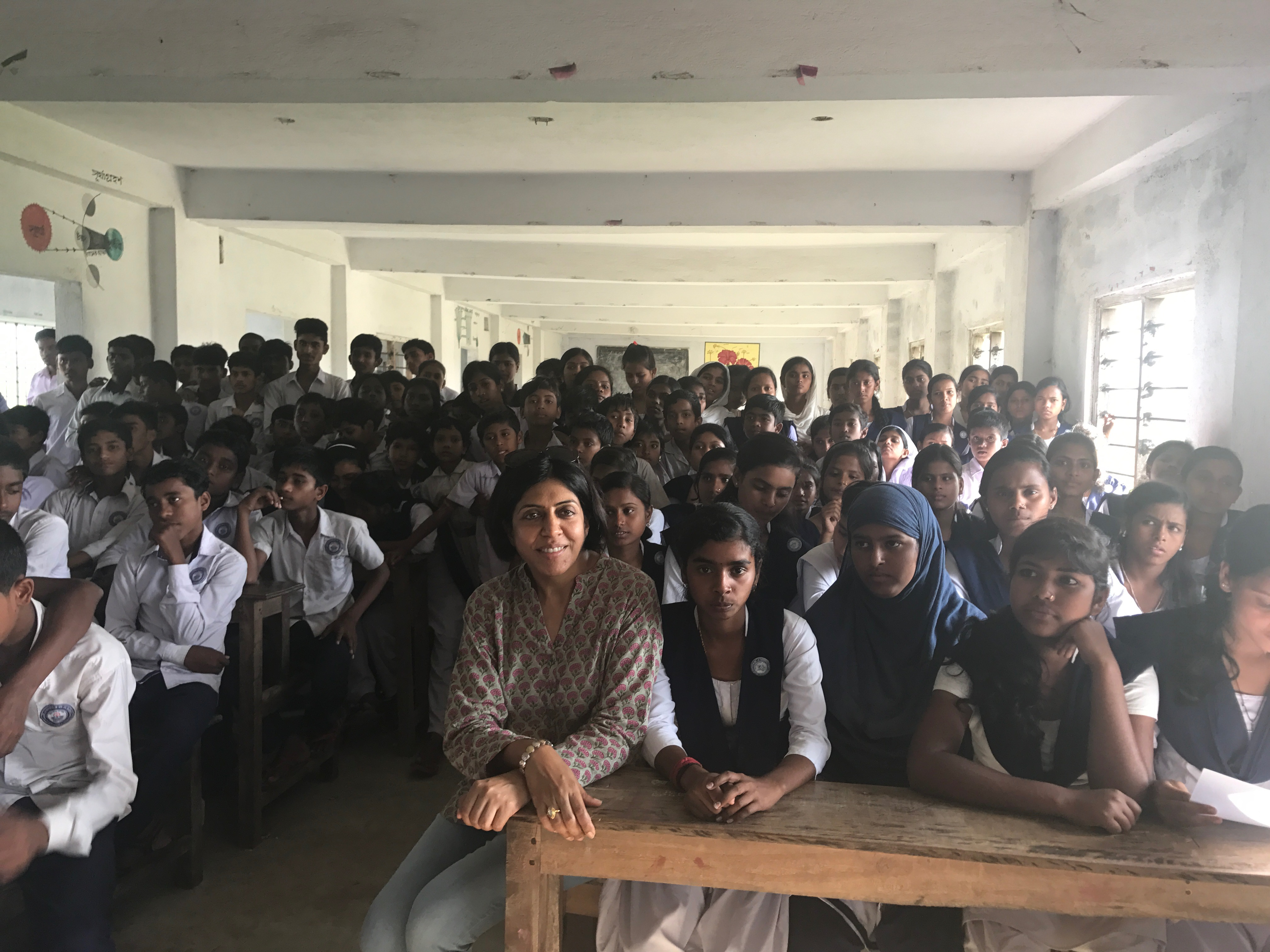
Leena Kejriwal with the students at a school during the rural awareness campaign

The organization also conducts educational campaigns across India that include programs for schools. In 2017, the organization conducted the "MISSING on a Journey" campaign, which included presentations at schools, street theatre, and public stencils in Ranchi, Lucknow, Agra, Jaipur, and New Delhi.

The organization has also worked with experts to develop the Missing Awareness and Safety School program (MASSp), for children ages 13 to 17.

== Livelihood Project ==
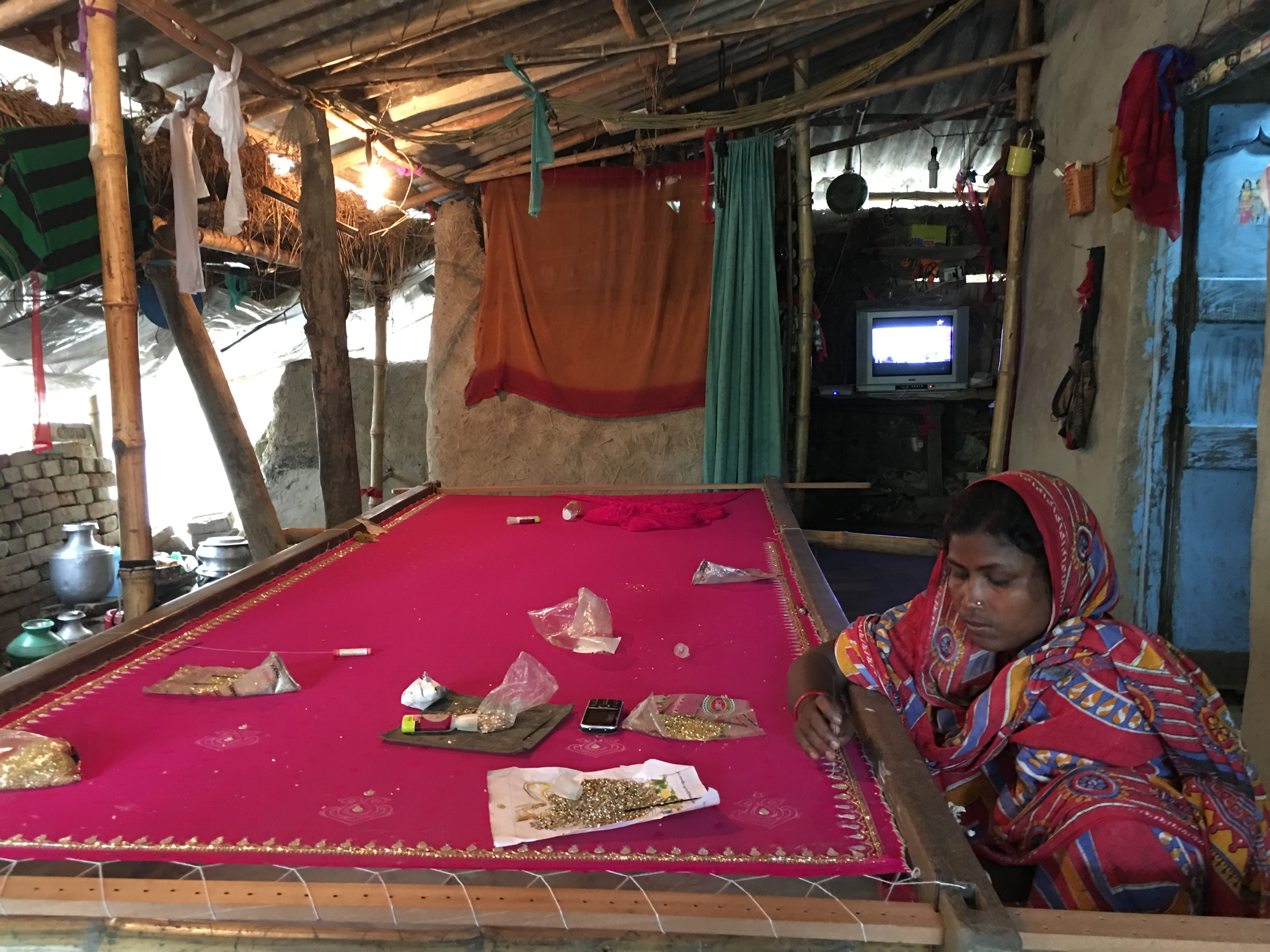
A survivor working with MISSING on the livelihood project

By 2018, the work of the organization expanded to include mentoring of young girls in West Bengal, as well as financial support for the development of new skills. The organization began a livelihood programme in rural Bengal for survivors of trafficking and vulnerable girls in high-trafficking areas, with mentoring for tailoring, computer programming, videography and in poultry farming.

== Awards ==
- Missing: Game for a Cause won the NASSCOM Indie Game of the Year award in 2016
- 2018 Digital Empowerment Foundation social entrepreneurship for change award for the #Missing stencil project
- 2021 Stop Slavery Campaigns Award from the Thomson Reuters Foundation
