= Jagdip Jagpal =

Jagdip Jagpal is an art curator and the director of India Art Fair.

== Biography ==
Jagpal was born in London and educated at Woodhouse College. She then studied law at the College of Law and the London School of Economics. She was a senior project coordinator at Whitworth Art Gallery and worked at Tate Modern before becoming the director of India Art Fair. She is on the development board of the Royal College of Art. Jagpal is a former trustee of Wallace Collection and Almeida Theatre in the UK.
