= Etikoppaka =

- Village
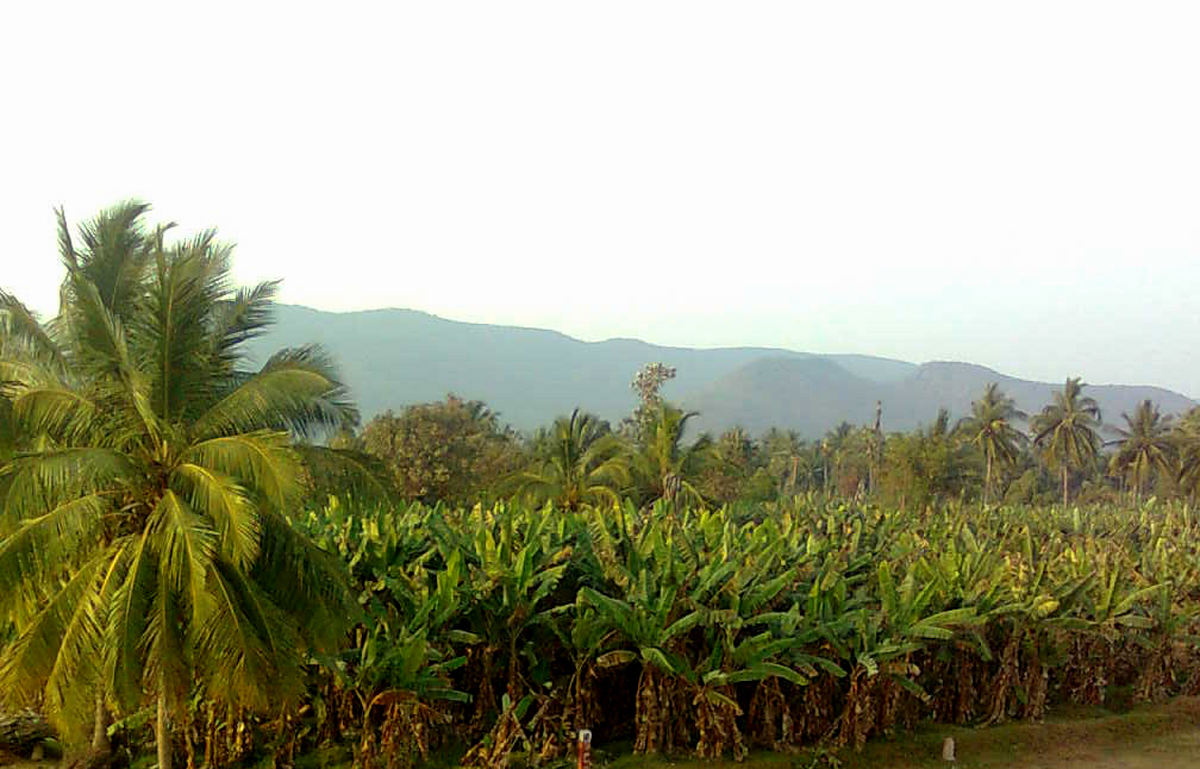
- Banana fields near Etikoppaka
- Interactive map of Etikoppaka
- Location in Andhra Pradesh, India Etikoppaka (India)
- Coordinates: 17.50°N 82.73°E
- Country: India
- State: Andhra Pradesh

Government
  - Type: Panchayati raj (India)
  - Body: Gram panchayat

Languages
  - Official: Telugu
- Time zone: UTC+5:30 (IST)
- Vehicle registration: AP

Etikoppaka Toys at an Exhibition in Visakhapatnam

Etikoppaka is a small village on the banks of Varaha River in Anakapalli district of Andhra Pradesh, India. In 2017, the traditional Etikoppaka toys acquired a geographical indication (GI) tag.

== Etikoppaka toys ==
In the early development stages of the Etikoppaka toys, they were only used by children as toys for the purpose of playing. The natural dyes and wood used in these toys made them safe play with and durable. However, gradually the Etikoppaka toys adapted to a broad usage. Today, they can be used as toys, decoration items, utility items and even gifting items.

For a long period of time, these toys were a part of the everyday lives of the people living here and in the neighbouring villages. Toy varieties include spinning tops, rattles, and animal figures. Etikoppaka boxes are also used for storing jewellery and sacred materials like vermillion. These toys became so popular that several South Indian traditions became attached to them. For example, every girl child was gifted a kitchen set or ‘lakkapidathalu,’ consisting of colourful vessels, ladels, stoves and even grinders for her first birthday. They also became a part of the wedding traditions and were used for the bride's trousseau to carry haldi Kumkum, betel nuts and other aromatic substances. They became so popular that they began to be sold as country fairs, weekly markets, railway stations and even bus stands.

Toys are made of soft wood and lacquer color. Coloured with natural dyes derived from seeds, lacquer, roots and leaves. The way of toy making is also known as turned wood lacquer craft. The Etikoppaka toys are considered to be ‘one with the nature’ since they are made purely out of natural elements such as seeds, lacquer, bark, roots and leaves. The wood derived to make these toys comes from the ‘Ankudu Karra’ tree (Wrightia tinctoria).

The artisans who engage in this craft have received several awards from forum likes the National Innovation Foundation, UNESCO CCI Seal of Excellence for Handicrafts and so on. Moreover, these toys have also been displayed at various prestigious venues like the Rashtrapathi Bhawan. Various organizations like the National Institute of Design (NID) have helped these artisans by conducting workshops for them to help them gain understanding of the popular market designs.

The Geographical Indication (GI) tag provided to these toys in 2017 has further contributed to their significance. This has allowed the counterfeit market issue to be tackled and for the sale of these toys to increase multi-fold. Due to their excellent quality, brilliant designs and A level craftsmanship, these toys are sold worldwide. Many countries like USA, Australia, France, Italy, and Germany import the Etikoppaka toys from India to sell or to display as decoration pieces in their museums.

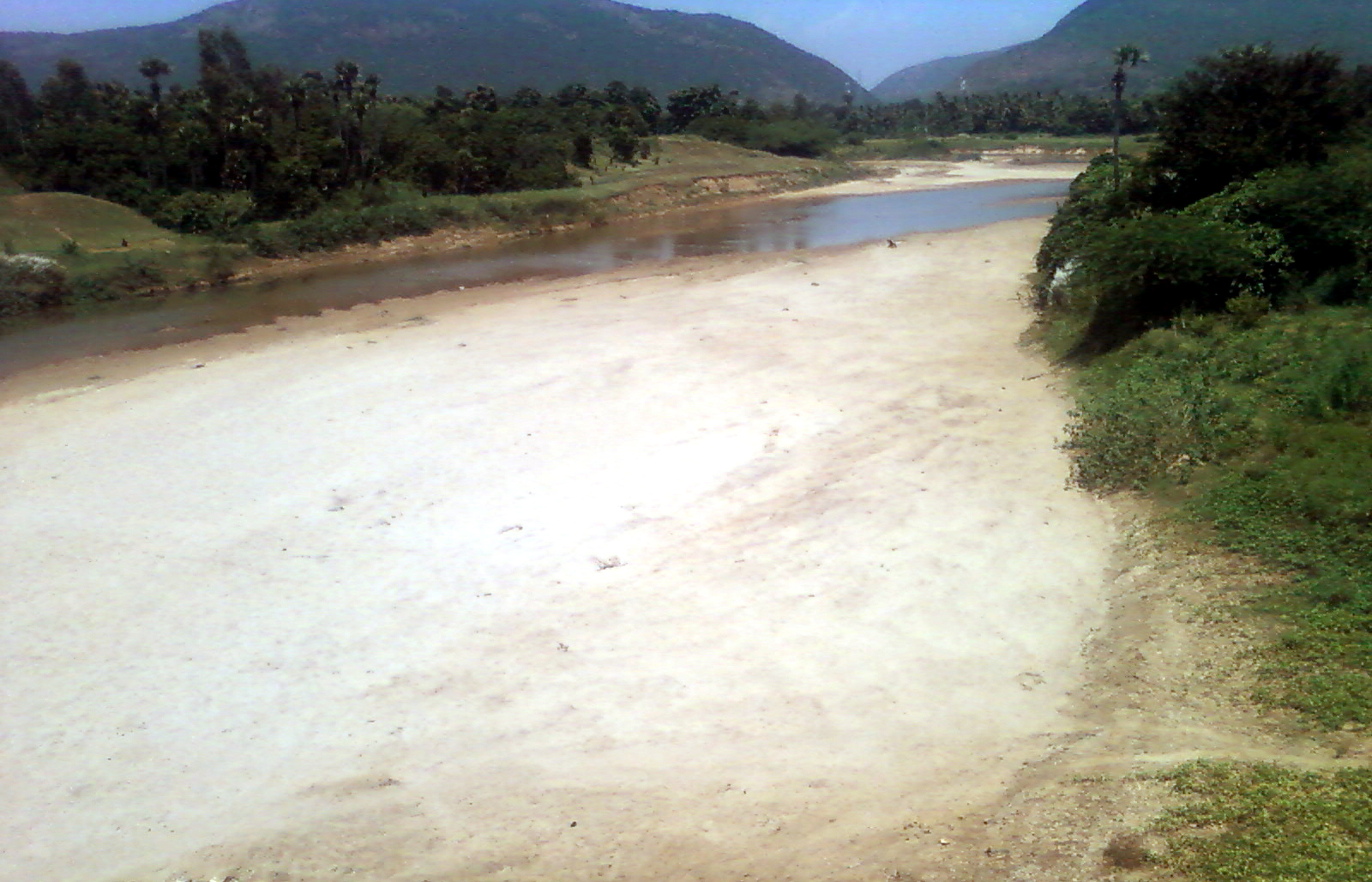
Varaha river near Etikoppaka
