= Patons Rock =

Locality in Tasman District, New Zealand

- locality
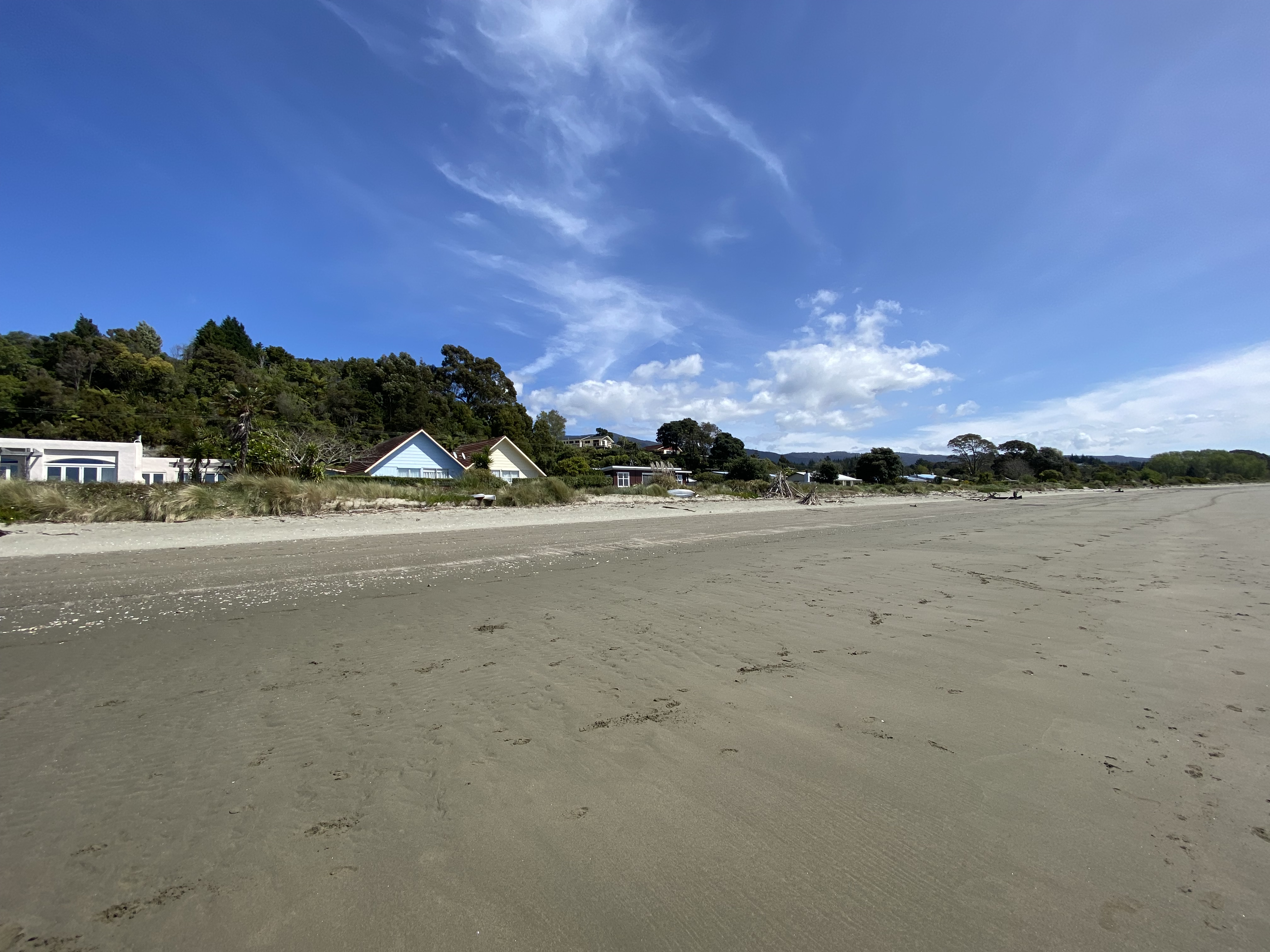
- Interactive map of Patons Rock
- Coordinates: 40°47′10″S 172°45′22″E
- Country: New Zealand
- Territorial authority: Tasman
- Ward: Golden Bay
- Electorates: West Coast-Tasman; Te Tai Tonga (Māori)

Government
  - Territorial authority: Tasman District Council
  - Mayor of Tasman: Tim King
  - West Coast-Tasman MP: Maureen Pugh
  - Te Tai Tonga MP: Tākuta Ferris

Area
  - Total: 4.58 km^{2} (1.77 sq mi)

Population (2023 census)
  - Total: 117
  - Density: 25.5/km^{2} (66.2/sq mi)
- Time zone: UTC+12 (NZST)
  - Summer (DST): UTC+13 (NZDT)
- Postcode: 7182
- Area code: 03

Patons Rock is a coastal settlement in the Tasman District of New Zealand. It is located in Golden Bay, northwest of Tākaka.

Located on the coast of Golden Bay, between Tākaka and Collingwood, two kilometres (1.2 mi) north of State Highway 60, Patons Rock was named for the pioneer Paton family, who arrived in Nelson on the Fifeshire in 1842. A shallow beach runs for 2.5 kilometres (1.6 mi) and is regarded as being safe for swimming. The eponymous rock, Patons Rock, is located at the eastern end of the beach. Many of the dwellings in Patons Rock are holiday homes, and there are no shops in the settlement.

== Demographics ==
Patons Rock locality covers 4.58 km^{2} (1.77 sq mi). It is part of the larger Golden Bay / Mohua statistical area.

Historical population
| Year | Pop. | ±% p.a. |
|---|---|---|
| 2006 | 102 | — |
| 2013 | 81 | −3.24% |
| 2018 | 96 | +3.46% |
| 2023 | 117 | +4.04% |

Patons Rock had a population of 117 in the 2023 New Zealand census, an increase of 21 people (21.9%) since the 2018 census, and an increase of 36 people (44.4%) since the 2013 census. There were 57 males and 57 females in 54 dwellings. 5.1% of people identified as LGBTIQ+. The median age was 59.0 years (compared with 38.1 years nationally). There were 21 people (17.9%) aged under 15 years, 6 (5.1%) aged 15 to 29, 51 (43.6%) aged 30 to 64, and 36 (30.8%) aged 65 or older.

People could identify as more than one ethnicity. The results were 92.3% European (Pākehā), 7.7% Māori, and 2.6% Asian. English was spoken by 94.9%, Māori by 5.1%, and other languages by 15.4%. No language could be spoken by 5.1% (e.g. too young to talk). The percentage of people born overseas was 28.2, compared with 28.8% nationally.

Religious affiliations were 17.9% Christian, and 2.6% other religions. People who answered that they had no religion were 64.1%, and 7.7% of people did not answer the census question.

Of those at least 15 years old, 24 (25.0%) people had a bachelor's or higher degree, 54 (56.2%) had a post-high school certificate or diploma, and 18 (18.8%) people exclusively held high school qualifications. The median income was $29,800, compared with $41,500 nationally. 6 people (6.2%) earned over $100,000 compared to 12.1% nationally. The employment status of those at least 15 was 30 (31.2%) full-time and 21 (21.9%) part-time.
