= Giles Hart =

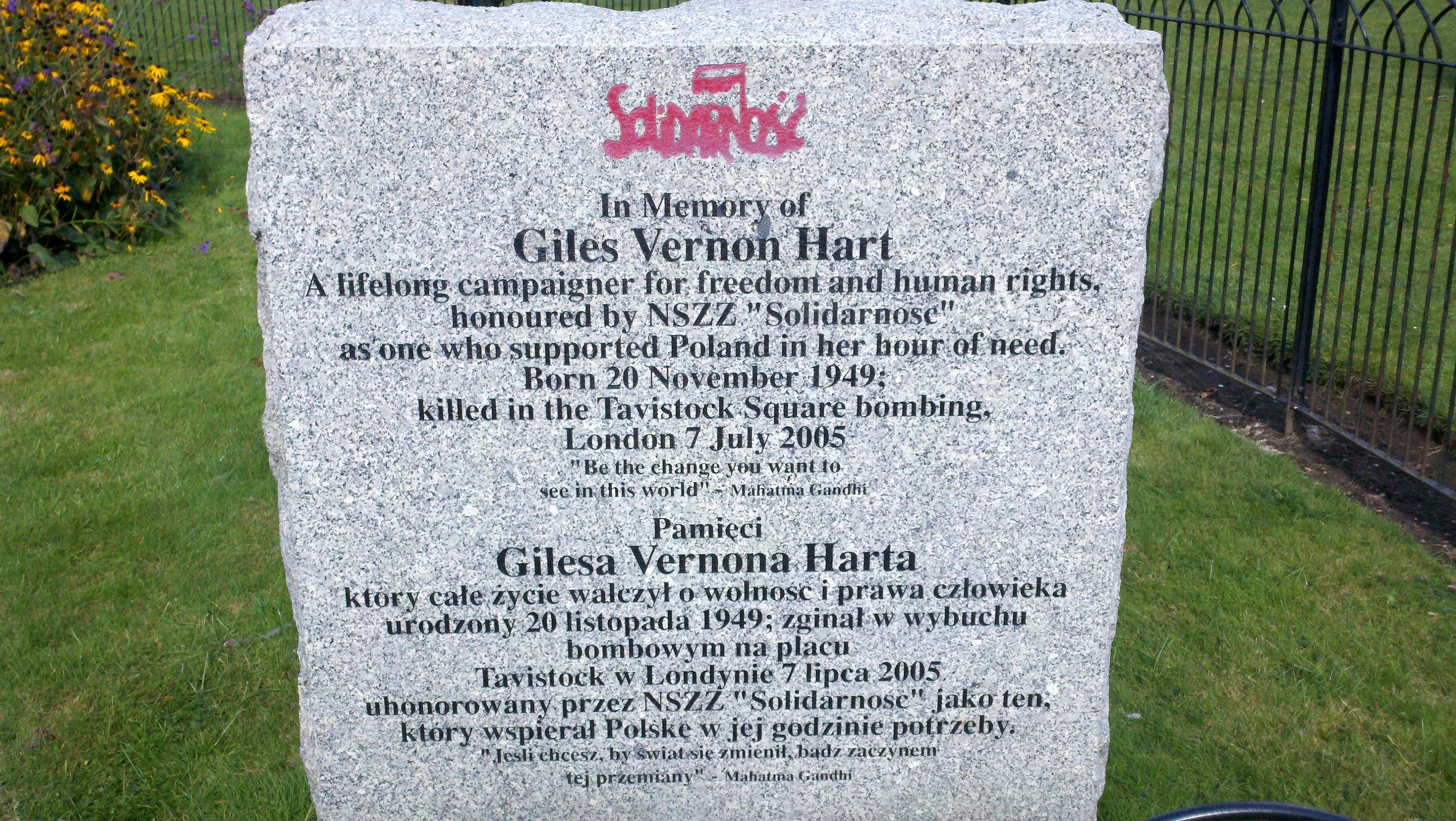
In Memory of Giles Vernon Hart

Giles Vernon Hart (20 November 1949 – 7 July 2005) was a trade unionist and British Telecom engineer working for BT Operate.

== Early life ==
Hart was born in Khartoum, Sudan, when his father was head of English at Gordon College. He moved to England with his family when he was five years old, and attended Woodhouse Grammar School, now Woodhouse College, and read mathematics at Royal Holloway College.

== Political campaigning ==
While working as an executive officer at Trinity House lighthouse authority, he set up a union branch.

In the 1980s, he was chairman, secretary and treasurer of the Polish Solidarity Campaign, the main British pro-Solidarność organisation, and edited a history For Our Freedom and Yours (1995). He was a prominent member of the British Humanist Association and chair of Havering Humanists, also chair of the H.G. Wells Society at the time of his untimely death.

== Death ==
He died in the 7 July 2005 London bombings, when he was killed instantly when travelling to work on the number 30 bus, which was blown up in Tavistock Square.

== Honours ==
In July 2005, he was posthumously awarded with the Polish Golden Krzyż Zasługi (Cross of Valor), and the Knight's Cross of the Order of Merit of the Republic of Poland. He has also been honoured with a memorial in Ravenscourt Park, Hammersmith, which was unveiled on 5 July 2008.
