= Robert G. W. Anderson =

British museum curator and historian of chemistry (born 1944)

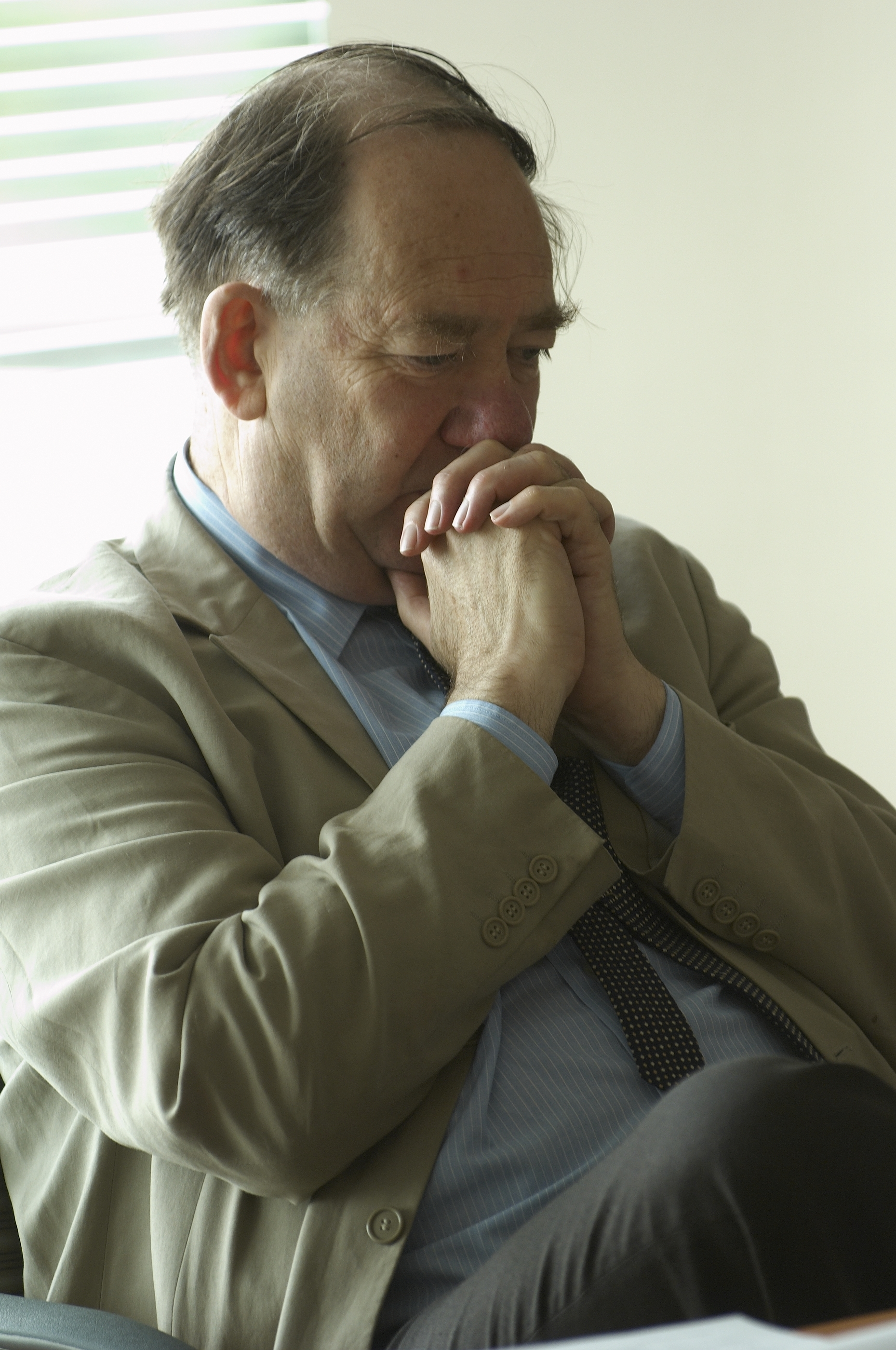
- Robert G. W. Anderson (2006)
- Born: 2 May 1944 (age 82)
- Education: St John's College, Oxford
- Scientific career
- Fields: Chemistry, History
- Workplaces: Royal Scottish Museum; Science Museum, London; National Museums of Scotland, Edinburgh; British Museum, London; Science History Institute, Philadelphia

Robert Geoffrey William Anderson, FSA, FRSE, FRSC (born 2 May 1944) is a British museum curator and historian of chemistry. He has interests in the history of chemistry, including the history of scientific instrumentation, the work of Joseph Black and Joseph Priestley, the history of museums, and the involvement of the working class in material culture. He has been Keeper at the Science Museum, London, and Director of the National Museums of Scotland, and the British Museum, London, and president and CEO of the Chemical Heritage Foundation (now the Science History Institute) in Philadelphia.

== Education ==
Anderson was born 2 May 1944 to Herbert Patrick Anderson and Kathleen Diana Burns. Anderson was educated at Woodhouse Grammar School, a former state grammar school in Finchley in North London, followed by St John's College, Oxford. He completed his B.A. in chemistry in 1966, and his B.Sc., and his Doctor of Philosophy (D. Phil.) in 1970. He studied the electrical conduction in free radical solutions and inelastic scattering of neutrons from adsorbed molecules.

== Life and career ==
Anderson joined the Royal Scottish Museum as an Assistant Keeper in 1970. In 1975, he moved to the chemistry department of the Science Museum, London. He became an Assistant Keeper of Chemistry. One of his challenges in 1976 was to incorporate materials from the history of medicine collection of the Wellcome Collection of the History of Medicine, which were acquired as a permanent loan. He organised a conference and edited "an excellent and detailed account" to celebrate the 250th Anniversary of the Faculty of Medicine of the University of Edinburgh, The Early Years of the Edinburgh Medical School. This was followed by a catalogue in 1978: The Playfair Collection and the Teaching of Chemistry at the University of Edinburgh 1713–1858. Anderson was also in charge of the renovation and expansion of the chemistry and industrial chemistry galleries in 1977. He became keeper of chemistry, succeeded Frank Greenaway as director from 1980 to 1984. From 1981 he was a Member of Annals of Science's Editorial Board.

Anderson returned to the Royal Scottish Museum as director from 1984 to 1985. When the Royal Scottish Museum amalgamated with National Museum of Antiquities in 1985, he became the director of the new National Museums of Scotland in Edinburgh, a position he retained until 1992.

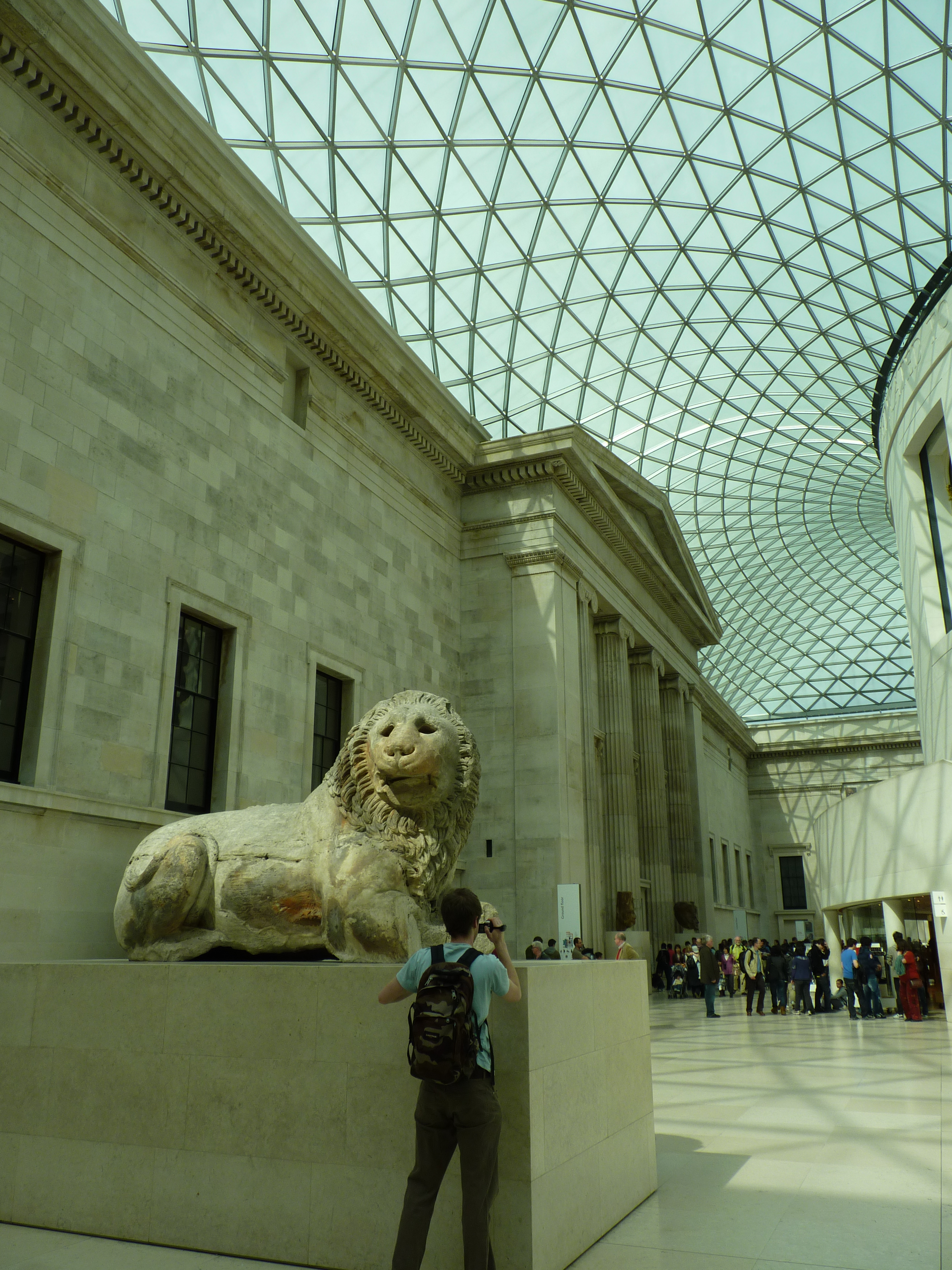
Queen Elizabeth II Great Court, British Museum

In 1992 Anderson joined the British Museum in London, where he was director from 1992 to 2002. Anderson oversaw the £100 million millennium project redevelopment of the British Museum's Queen Elizabeth II Great Court, designed by Norman Foster and opened by the Queen on 6 December 2000. Anderson was succeeded as director of the British Museum in 2002 by Neil MacGregor.

Anderson has been president of the Scientific Instrument Commission of the International Union of History and Philosophy of Science (1982–1997), and of the British Society for the History of Science (1988–1990). In 2004, Anderson became president of the Association of Independent Libraries.

Anderson has held visiting academic posts at the Institute for Advanced Study, Princeton University and at the Centre for Research in the Arts, Social Sciences, and Humanities (CRASSH) at the University of Cambridge (2002–2003). He is an Emeritus Fellow of Clare Hall, Cambridge.

As of 28 July 2016, Anderson became interim president and CEO of the Chemical Heritage Foundation (now the Science History Institute), a history of science organization in Philadelphia, Pennsylvania, USA. He succeeded German historian of science Carsten Reinhardt. On 11 January 2017, Anderson was named the institution's ongoing president and CEO. He was succeeded by David Allen Cole as of 20 May 2020.

Anderson has published at least 14 monographs or catalogues and at least 50 papers. His publications include works on the history of scientific instrumentation, the history of museums, and the work of Joseph Black and Joseph Priestley.

== Awards and honors ==
Anderson is a member of the International Academy of the History of Science, and a Commandeur de l’Ordre des Arts et des Lettres (France). He is a Fellow of the Royal Society of Edinburgh (1990), the Society of Antiquaries of London (1986) and of the Royal Society of Chemistry. In 1990 he was elected Honorary Fellow of the Society of Antiquaries of Scotland.

Anderson is a recipient of the Dexter Award (1986) and of the Paul Bunge Prize, which he was awarded in 2016 for a lifetime of "outstanding achievement in writing about and promoting the understanding of historic scientific instruments".

== Bibliography ==
- R. G. W. Anderson, Presidential Address: "What Is Technology?": Education through Museums in the Mid-Nineteenth Century. The British Journal for the History of Science, Volume 25, Number 2, pages 169–184, June 1992. Published by Cambridge University Press on behalf of The British Society for the History of Science.

== See also ==
- Frank Greenaway, a colleague at the Science Museum
- List of directors of the British Museum
