= Journal of Clinical Periodontology =

- Discipline: Periodontology
- Language: English
- Edited by: Panos N. Papapanou

Publication details
- History: 1974-present
- Publisher: Wiley-Blackwell
- Frequency: Monthly
- Impact factor: 8.728 (2020)

Standard abbreviations
- ISO 4: J. Clin. Periodontol.

Indexing
- CODEN: JCPEDZ
- ISSN: 0303-6979 (print); 1600-051X (web)
- LCCN: sv95001404
- OCLC no.: 889386180

Links
- Journal homepage; Online access; Online archive

The Journal of Clinical Periodontology is a monthly peer-reviewed medical journal covering periodontology. It is published by John Wiley & Sons. It was established in 1974 by the British, Dutch, French, German, Scandinavian, and Swiss periodontology societies and is an official journal of the European Federation of Periodontology. Articles are published in English. The editor-in-chief is Panos N. Papapanou (Columbia University, New York). Currently, the Journal is ranked #1 out of 92 in Dentistry, Oral Surgery & Medicine.

== Abstracting and indexing ==
The journal is abstracted and indexed in:

- CABI databases
- Chemical Abstracts Service
- Current Contents/Clinical Medicine
- Current Contents/Life Sciences
- EBSCO databases
- Index Medicus/MEDLINE/PubMed
- ProQuest databases
- Science Citation Index
- Scopus

According to the Journal Citation Reports, the journal has a 2020 impact factor of 8.728.
