= John Somerville (sculptor) =

British sculptor

John Somerville (born 1951) is a British sculptor.

Somerville was born in north London and attended Woodhouse Grammar School and Barnet College. He studied Fine Art Bronze Casting under David Reid (Leverhulme Fellowship, Central St Martin's School of Art) and opened his first bronze studio in 1979.

He has had numerous one-man shows in the UK, Europe and the United States. He exhibits regularly at the Royal Academy Summer Exhibition. His work appears regularly at Christie's and Sotheby's auction houses in London and New York. Commissions include rock stars in bronze for the Hard Rock Cafes in New York, Houston, Los Angeles, Hawaii and Reykjavík; public monuments and commemorative busts.

In 2012 Somerville had a severe stroke which left him with weakness in his left arm and leg, partial sight loss in one eye and several hidden disabilities including fatigue. Despite these handicaps, and following physiotherapy, he continues to sculpt and encourage others to sculpt.

In 2014 he completed a statue of a seated lifesize Spike Milligan on a bench for Avenue House Estate Trust at Stephens House and Gardens in Finchley, north London, which is the product of over ten years of fundraising by Barbara Warren of the Finchley Society, of which Milligan was the first president. The statue was unveiled before a large crowd including show business personalities on 4 September 2014.
