= India Art Fair =

Art fair held in New Delhi, India

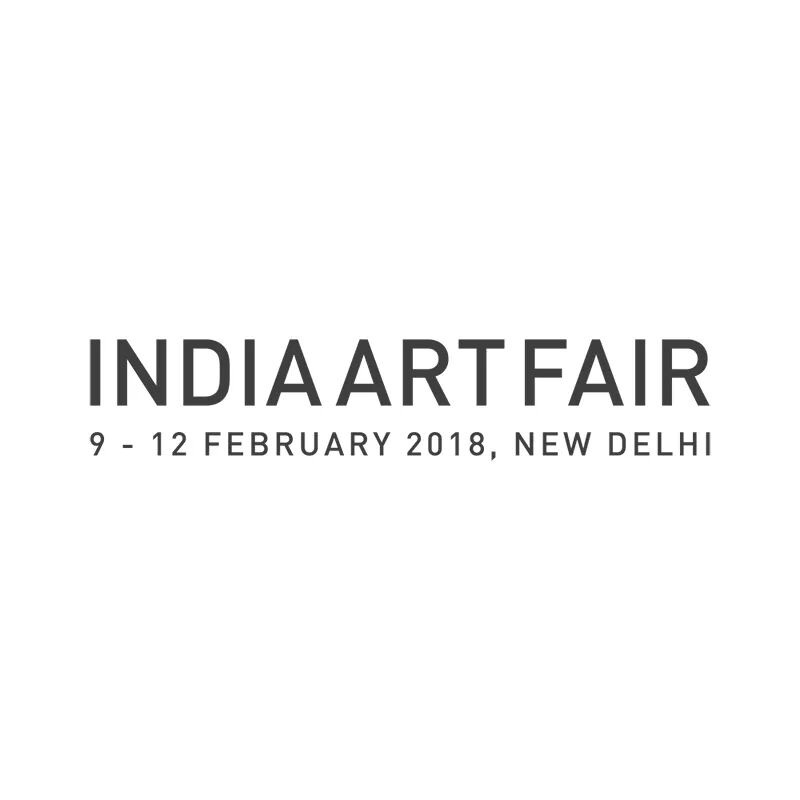
India Art Fair logo 2018

India Art Fair, previously known as India Art Summit founded by Sunil Gautam, is an annual Indian modern and contemporary art fair held in New Delhi, India. The fair includes paintings, sculptures, photography, mixed media, prints, drawings and video art. The first three editions of the fair were organized at Pragati Maidan, one of India's largest and oldest exhibitions grounds. Starting from the 4th edition, the venue was shifted to NSIC grounds, Okhla. First held in 2008, it is India's largest art fair. The art fair includes several pavilions of exhibits by galleries and solo projects by several artists. It also has an art education series with guided walks conducted by curators and students of art history. Simultaneously, there is a speakers' forum with panel of Indian and international experts from the art domain to discuss issues pertaining to the art in the region. It focuses on key issues related with the art production, art market and its reception in India.

The first fair targeted over 6000 visitors with 34 exhibiting galleries at the fair, and over 550 contemporary and modern artworks. The fair rapidly gained popularity, and the first three fairs had a total 146,000 visitors, making it among the world's most popular art fairs.

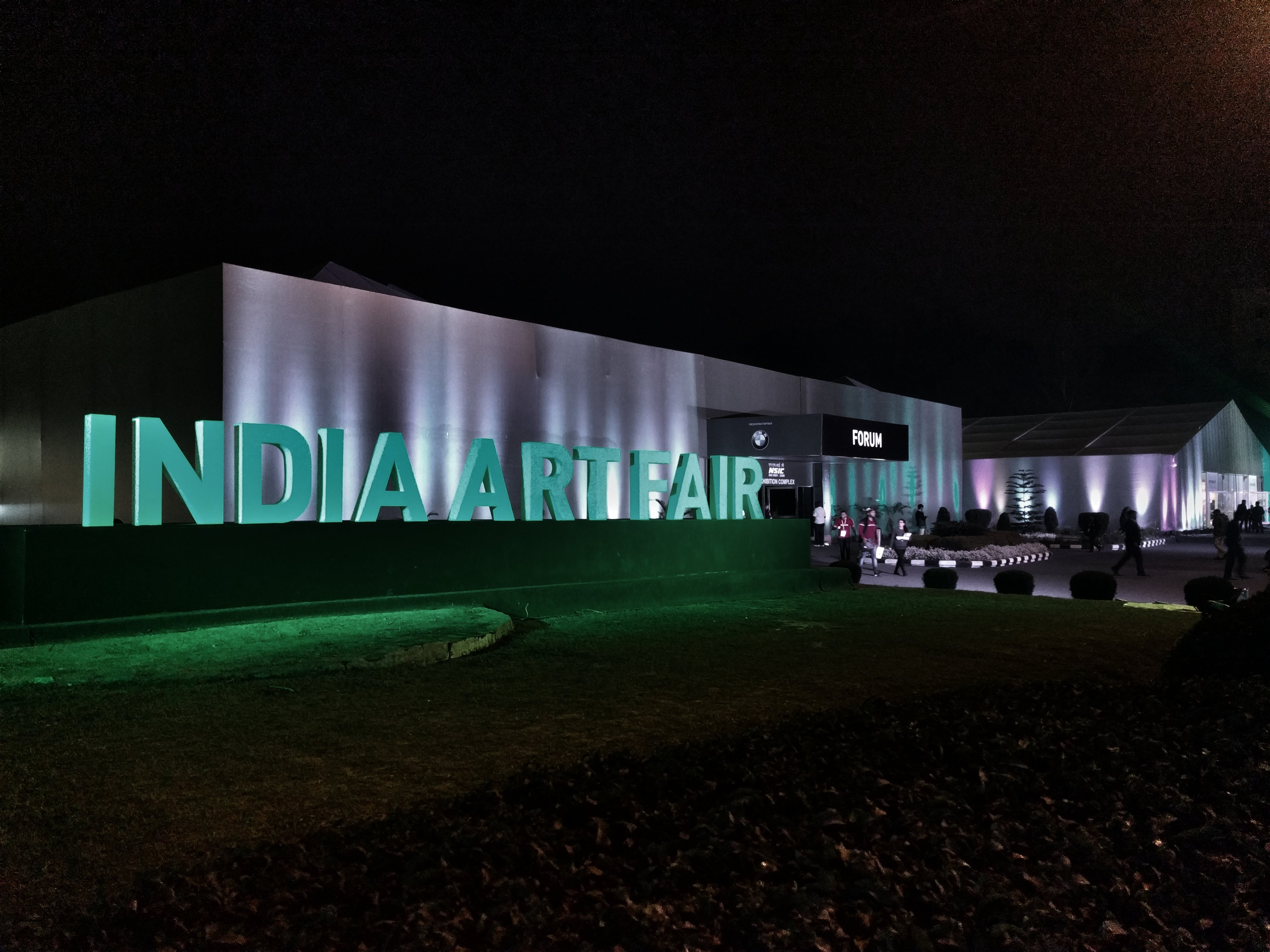
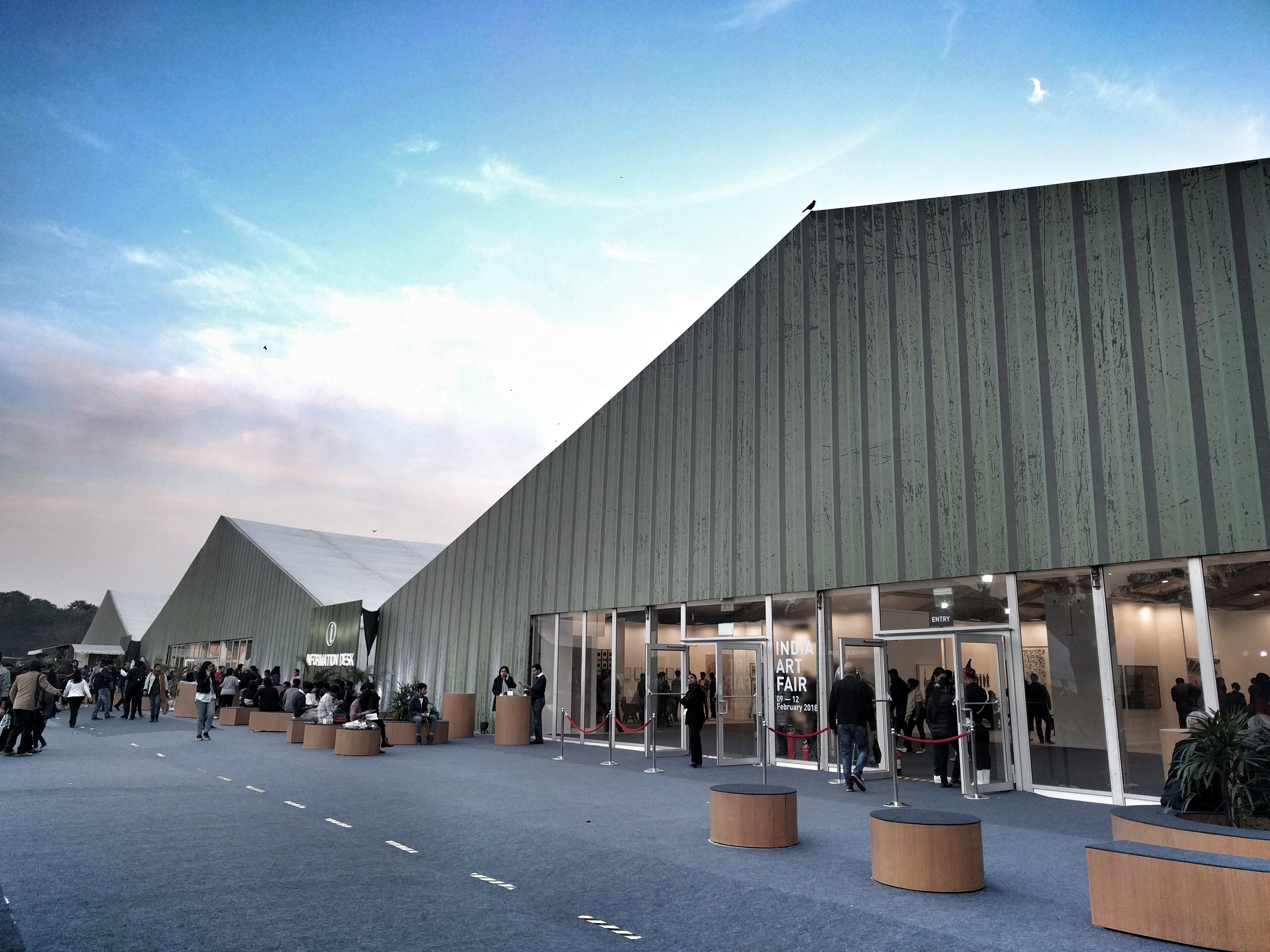
India Art Fair 2018

== History ==
India Art Fair is the biggest fair of modern and contemporary Indian art in the world. Its first three editions attracted over 146,000 visitors and its fourth edition held in 2012 canvassed 91 exhibitors from 20 countries. Over the years the fair has mainly showcased Indian modernists (including Bombay Progressive Artists' Group), Indian diaspora artists such as Anish Kapoor, contemporary Indian artists, international artists and art from the subcontinent.

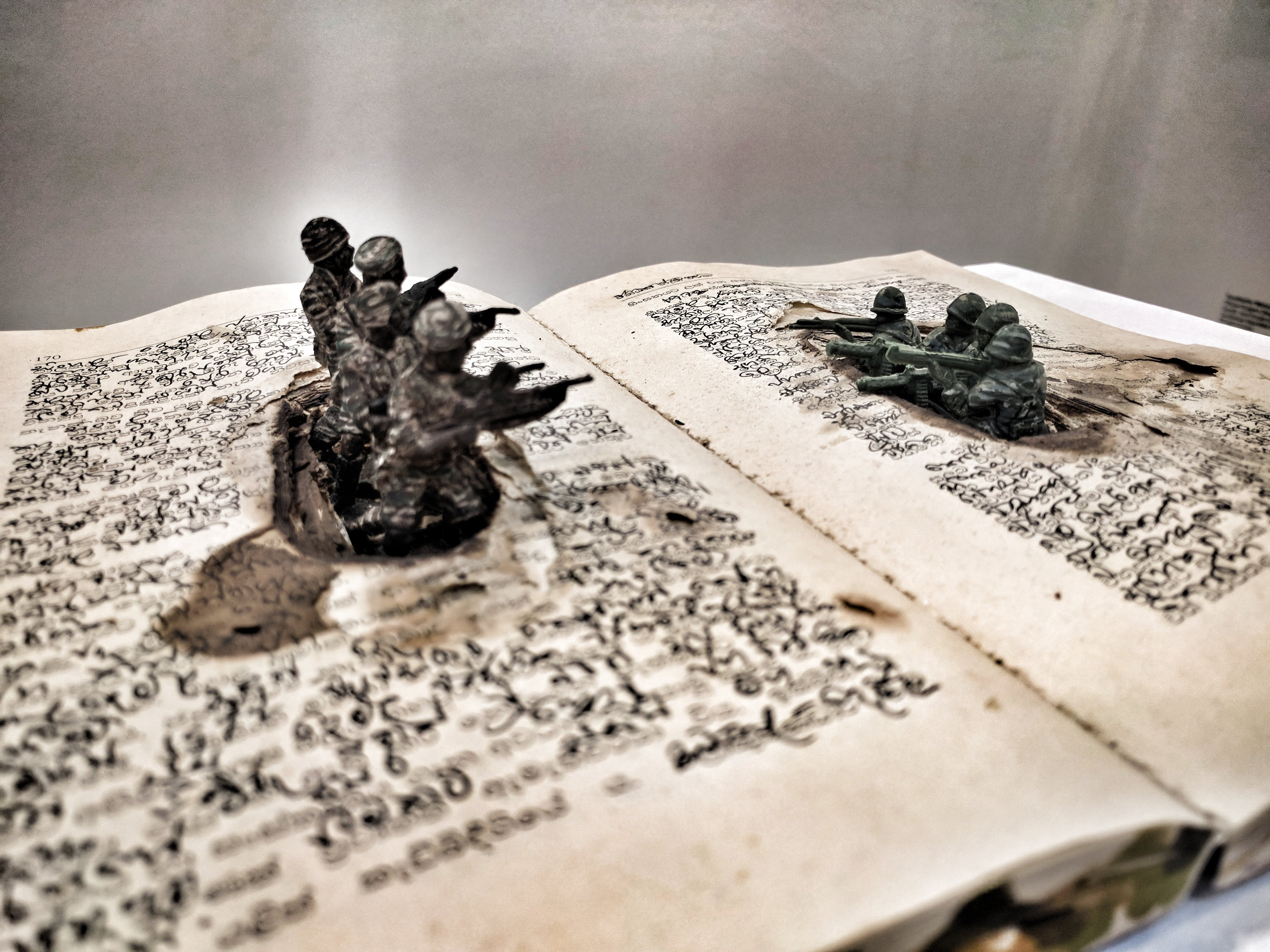
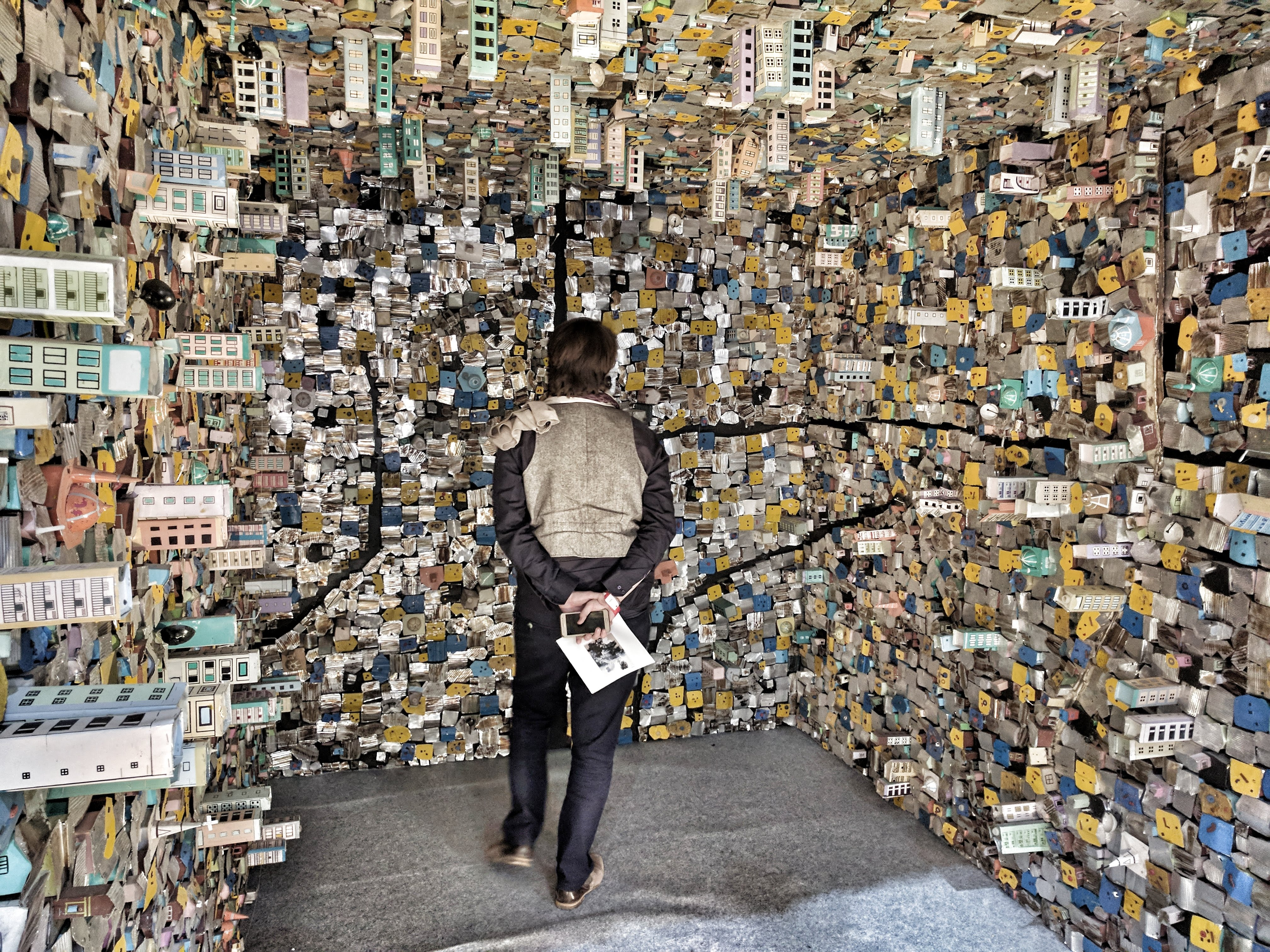
Installations at India Art Fair 2018

Following in the tradition of international art fairs and other global platforms for art exhibition and sale, then Founder and Director of India Art Summit Sunil Gautam realised the need for a similar platform in India to respond to the global interest in Indian art. This led him to conceptualize the first ever India Art Summit (IAS) in 2008. It was patronised by prominent Indian artists like Anjolie Ela Menon, S H Raza, Krishen Khanna and Keshav Malik. Since then it has taken place every year with the exception of 2010. Sunil Gautam, the owner of the India Art Summit fully divested his 100% stake in early 2011 to three stakeholders, Neha Kirpal (51%), Sandy Angus(35%) and Will Ramsay (14%), co-founders of the Hong Kong Art Fair. In 2009 the highlight of the fair was a display of Pablo Picasso's works, exhibited by Beck & Eggeling, a German gallery. The same year Lisson Gallery brought diaspora artist Anish Kapoor's sculptures to India for the first time. The New owners renamed India Art Summit as India Art Fair before 2012 edition.

In Sept 2016, just before 2017 edition of India Art Fair, Neha Kirpal divested her majority stake in the India Art Fair to MCH Group, the owner of Art Basel Franchise, retaining just 10% stake to play minor role in the art fair. At the same time Will Ramsay too divested his stake in the India Art Fair to new owners MCH Group(60.3%), Sandy Angus (29.7%) and Neha Kirpal(10%). Later MCH Group, Swiss giant in the art fair circuit, sold its entire stake in India Art Fair (IAF) to Angus Montgomery Arts in 2019, making Sandy Angus the sole-owner of the India Art Fair, New Delhi. The current portfolio of Chairman Sandy Angus led Angus Montgomery Arts includes Taipei Dangdai, India Art Fair, Sydney Contemporary, PHOTOFAIRS Shanghai, Art Central Hong Kong, Art Düsseldorf, Photo London and the forthcoming Art SG, Tokyo Gendai and PHOTOFAIRS New York.

== Annually ==
2008: Inaugural edition, known as India Art Summit, opened at Pragati Maidan The first fair targeted over 6000 visitors with 34 exhibiting galleries at the fair, and 550 contemporary and modern artworks.

2009: The second edition saw the number of exhibiting galleries increase to 54 with attendance of over 40,000 visitors. Mr.Sunil Gautam, Founder and Managing Director of India Art Summit,(then chairman, Hanmer & MSL) divested his entire stake in 2011 by the time of 3rd edition

2011: The third edition hosted 84 gallery booths, and visitor levels significantly rose to 128,000. Also in 2011, in advance of the 4th edition, Sunil Gautam divested his full stake in India Art Fair to three partners; Neha Kirpal (Associate Summit Director, India Art Summit), Sandy Angus (Chairman of global exhibitions group Montgomery Worldwide) and Will Ramsay (Founder of PULSE Art Fairs, and Affordable Art Fairs).

2012: For the fourth edition of India Art Summit, which was renamed as India Art Fair moved to the NSIC Grounds in Okhla and hosted 90 galleries from 20 countries, 1000 artists from around the world, with 80,000 visitor and visits by 26 Museum groups including representatives from the Tate, Guggenheim, New Museum, San Jose Museum of Art, Pompidou Centre, MOMA and the Singapore Art Museum.

2013: At the preview alone of the fifth edition over 3,000 works of art were sold by 105 exhibitors from 24 countries. YES Bank joined as Presenting Partners, maintaining the partnership for the next three editions.

2014: The sixth edition featured 91 booths and modern and contemporary works by over 1,000 artists from India and overseas. Participants included 12 new galleries from outside India, including Israel, France, Portugal, Germany, Spain, Turkey and Karachi, Pakistan. The Himalayas Art Museum in Shanghai and the Mark Rothko Museum in Latvia both participated in the fair for the first time. A public sculpture installation titled M.I.S.S.I.N.G. highlighted the gender gap in India.

2015: The seventh edition hosted 91 exhibiting booths and over 80,000 visitors. Sales were up 25% and were reported not just from Delhi, but also from tier-II and tier-III cities such as Ahmedabad, Chandigarh and Jaipur. A number of new spaces were launched, including the Design Store located in the new IAF Courtyard, as well as a new rooftop restaurant

2016: The eighth edition: BMW joined as Presenting Partners, and the fair was restructured into 5 main sections: Galleries, featuring leading Indian, South Asian and international galleries; Focus, showing solo presentations which have been curated by participating galleries or institutions; Institutional, showcasing leading international and Indian museums and art foundations presenting elements of their programmes or collaborations commissioned specially for the fair; Platform, representing young emerging artists or collectives from throughout South Asia, open to galleries and foundations within the region; and Projects, showing artworks, including large scale sculptures or site specific installations, at the fair. On the 12 September 2016, MCH Swiss Exhibitions (Basel) Ltd., a company of MCH Group Ltd., acquired 60.3% of the shares in Seventh Plane Pvt. Ltd in New Delhi, the organiser of India Art Fair. With the participation of MCH Group and the co-ownership with Angus Montgomery Ltd. (29.7%) and the Founding Director Neha Kirpal (10%), India Art Fair will have new ownership for its ninth edition taking place 2–5 February 2017. Kirpal, who took over the charge of the fair in 2011 from the founder of the India Art Fair(Summit) Mr.Sunil Gautam, will still play a role in its development. The new ownership comes into effect ahead of the next edition of the fair in February 2017 although the value of its engagement will not be fully felt until 2018. India is the “first region of focus” for MCH, indicative of the growing international interest in Indian and South Asian art, and the building of a strong cultural ecosystem in the region, from Kochi Biennale to Dhaka Art Summit.

2017: Jagdip Jagpal was appointed as Fair Director in August 2017.

2021: Jaya Asokan is appointed as Fair Director in March 2021 for its 14th Edition.

== Gallery ==
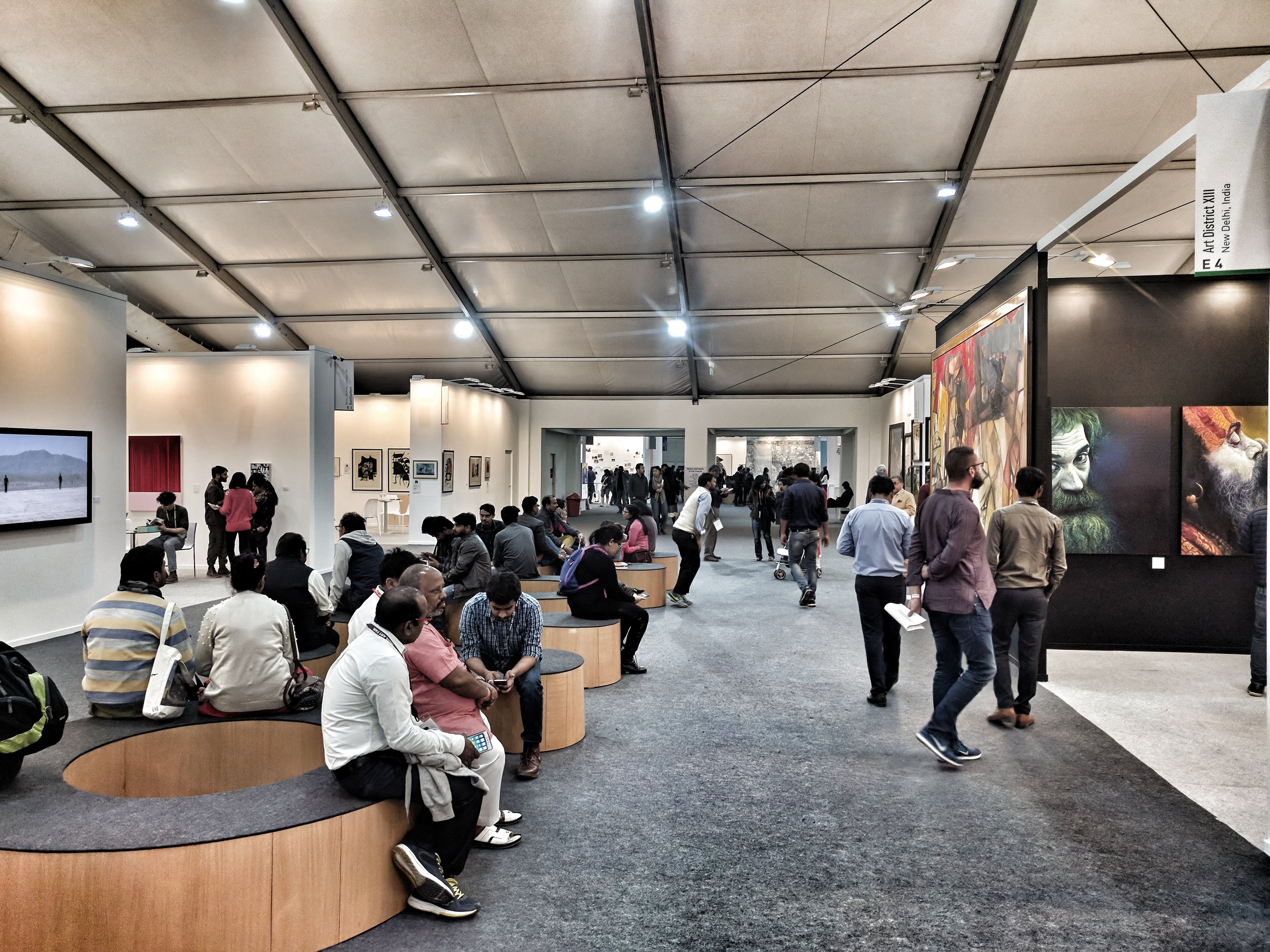
