= Seal of Excellence for Handicrafts =

The Seal of Excellence for Handicrafts is awarded to handicraft products annually by UNESCO.

The programme operates separately in several Asian regions: South East Asia, Central Asia, South Asia and East Asia. Although initiated and generally coordinated by UNESCO, several partner NGOs implement the program at regional and national levels. Products are submitted annually between April and June and judging takes place in September by an international panel of experts selected by UNESCO.

The stated objective of the Seal is to encourage artisans to produce handicrafts using traditional skills, patterns and themes in an innovative way, in order to ensure the continuity and sustainability of these traditions and skills. The program was established to promote the handicraft sector, which play an important economic and social role in developing countries. The award aims to promote sustainable livelihoods as well as encourage the continued use of traditional knowledge.

Products can be submitted in one of 7 categories:

1. Textiles
2. Natural Fibre
3. Ceramics
4. Wood
5. Stone
6. Metal
7. Other (including paintings)

== Judging criteria ==
The products are judged according to a number of set criteria. The general criteria, which was updated for 2007, includes

- Excellence: Demonstrated excellence and standard-setting quality in craftsmanship
- Authenticity: Expression of cultural identity and traditional aesthetic values
- Innovation: Innovative approach to design and production
- Eco-friendliness: Respect for the environment in materials and production techniques
- Marketability: The potential of the item in world markets

Pre-conditions include considerations of social responsibility in product, and that the product classify as a handicraft according to the definition that appears on UNESCO Bangkok's Seal of Excellence website

== History ==
The Seal was launched in South East Asia in 2001. In 2004 it expanded to Central Asia and South Asia, and to East Asia in 2006. Future expansion is planned for other regions of the world.
