= DaDaFest =

Disability arts organisation based in Liverpool, UK

- The official logo for DaDaFest since 2012.
- Predecessor: Arts Integrated Merseyside (AIM) and then North West Disability Arts Forum (NWDAF)
- Formation: 1990; 36 years ago
- Founder: John McGrath
- Purpose: Disability arts

DaDaFest is a British disability arts organisation based in Liverpool, United Kingdom. It delivers an international, biennial festival and organises other events to promote disability and deaf arts from a variety of cultural perspectives. Alongside the festival and events, DaDaFest organises opportunities for disabled and deaf people to gain access to the arts. This includes training and a youth focused programme.

DaDaFest is funded by Arts Council England and Liverpool City Council as well as other private and public sector partners.

== History ==
DaDaFest was founded as Arts Integrated Merseyside (or AIM) as a part of the Shape Arts network in 1984. AIM was integral to the early campaign for greater equality and access for disabled people, but was not disability led.

With John McGrath as its Development Officer, the organisation became one of the UK's first disability control-led arts forums after it broke away from the Shape Network and set itself up as North West Disability Arts Forum (NWDAF) in 1986. It was formally constituted in 1990, with Mandy Colleran becoming its director. The organisation eventually re-branded itself to 'DaDa - Disability and Deaf Arts' in 2008 and again to 'DaDaFest' in 2012.

== Festival ==
DaDaFest delivered its first international festival in 2001 and continued to put on yearly festivals until 2010 when it became a biennial. The festival has since taken place in 2012 and 2014 (8 November 2014 – 11 January 2015).

The organisation works with a number of partners to deliver the festival. These include: National Museums Liverpool, Liverpool Biennial, The Bluecoat, Liverpool Everyman, Liverpool Playhouse, FACT, Unity Theatre and Royal Liverpool Philharmonic amongst others.

=== 2016 Festival ===
DaDaFest International 2014 presented work produced by artists close to their home in Liverpool as well as internationally that will challenge ideals and celebrate disability culture. A programme of music, dance, live arts, comedy and much more was presented." Highlights included:

- Amadou and Mariam - Amadou and Mariam, the Grammy Award nominated musical duo from Mali and DaDaFest International 2016 headliners, produce music that infuses traditional Malian sound with rock guitars and instruments from Cuba, Egypt, Syria and India in a combination that has been dubbed "Afro-blues".
- The Viewing by Matin O'Brien, Sheree Rose and Rhiannon Aarons - The Viewing is the final of a trilogy of works which were originally conceived by Rose and Bob Flanagan to address his early death from cystic fibrosis.
- DaDaFest International Congress – "All the world's a stage… But not if you can't get on it." - The two-day event explored how the arts are delivered from artists and practitioners from across the globe, and how the context within which we operate makes for exhilarating, diverse, disruptive and radical arts work.
- Assisted Suicide: The Musical - Disabled activist, actor and comedian Liz Carr has chosen the spectacular world of musical theatre as the backdrop to explore the complex and controversial subject of assisted suicide in her new show.
- Guide Gods - Using dance, live music, humour and interviews with religious leaders, academics and deaf and disabled people, acclaimed performer Claire Cunningham goes on a perilous quest to explore how the major world faiths view deafness and disability in this witty and illuminating show.

=== 2014 Festival ===
DaDaFest International 2014 presented a "breathtaking array of high quality disability and Deaf arts from around the world." Highlights included:

- Art of the Lived Experiment - Curated by Aaron Williamson, this exhibition addressed the idea that life and art are in a state of continual change and uncertainty.
- The Ugly Girl by Terry Galloway (US) - a no-holds barred play with a wildly comic twist on the stereotype of a queer, disabled, intellectual trouble-maker.
- Backstage in Biscuit Land - the highly acclaimed show from Jess Thom.
- Staff Benda Bilili - the super-band appeared at the Philharmonic Hall.

=== 2012 Festival ===
The 2012 festival brought together a large collection of exhibitions and performances. These included:

- Niet Normaal - Difference on Display - This was an exhibition created by Ine Gevers and Garry Robson that brought together the work of 24 artists from across the world. It was adapted from an earlier exhibition that premiered in Amsterdam. The theme that this exhibition discussed was 'What is normal? And who decides what normality is?', this was a question that the creator herself deemed as 'unanswerable' but that it was 'worth debating anyway'.
- Changing Capacities - Changing Identities - This was a seminar that was part of the 2012 festival and was organised by the University of Liverpool's new Thinking on Living with Dying research network. It discussed how the changes to peoples' lives caused by illness and disability is not always a loss.
- The Eavesdropper - This was an intervention at the Walker Art Gallery by artist Aaron Williamson. Williamson explored the 'secretive dialogue' lurking beneath the gallery's paintings. He also took up residence at the gallery throughout DaDaFest 2012.
- The House of the Moles - This was a play created by Terry Galloway that worked with UK- and US-based performers and musicians about the American Ugly laws in the period between 1940 and 1950.

=== 2010 Festival ===
In 2010, DaDaFest celebrated their tenth year. The 2010 programme explored the theme of Objects of Curiosity and Desire, investigating identity and our place in an ever-changing world. Highlights included:

- A few Objects of Curiosity and Desire - a joint exhibition of the work of Tom Shakespeare, Tanya Raabe and Simon McKeown at The Bluecoat. This exhibition also featured work by Fourth Plinth artist and Turner Prize nominee Yinka Shonibare.
- Oska Bright - short films made by people with a learning disability were shown from the Oska Bright Film Festival (Brighton).
- GIMP – the UK premiere of Heidi Latsky's performance.

== Projects and initiatives ==
While the festival every two years may be the main attention of the organisation, DaDaFest also organises various projects and initiatives outside of the festival programme.

Projects that DaDaFest has organised or is currently organising are:

- DaDaFest Rookies - DaDaFest Rookies aims to increase employability within the creative sector for young disabled people through training, mentoring and placements within arts organisations. The project will see more disabled people involved in training, mentoring and placements within arts organisations.
- Young DaDaFest - DaDaFest organises various projects that involve young people, these include: steering groups that allow young people to make decisions for other projects; short films and a separate youth festival. DaDaFest also enables young people to earn Arts Award accreditation. Since the start of the young people's program in 2002, DaDaFest has had 2000 people involved in youth projects.
- Disability Equality Action Training - This is a scheme that addresses the issues faced by disabled and deaf people regarding access to everyday opportunities. Participants on the course are taught about these issues and gain an understanding of how to comply with the Disability Discrimination Act, Human Rights and how to work without bias. The training promotes working to the Social Model of Disability.
- Hands On - This is a website and network set up in 2011 designed to provide deaf people working in the arts with a place to share ideas and network with others in the industry.
- Arts-Life - This is a research project with the aim to increase the attendance of disabled and deaf people, including older people at arts venues and events around Merseyside. It also aims to improve the experience that people have while attending. It is led by the Liverpool Arts Regeneration Consortium.

== Notable people associated with DaDaFest ==
- Mandy Colleran – Former director
- Laurence Clark- stand-up comedian. He started his career with DaDaFest and continues to perform at the festival.
- Amadou and Mariam - The Grammy award-nominated afro-funk duo headlined DaDaFest International 2016.
- Dame Evelyn Glennie - Scottish percussionist. She performed at the Liverpool Philharmonic Hall as part of DaDaFest 2012.
- Mat Fraser - actor, musician, writer and patron of DaDaFest.
- Mike McCartney - performing artist, photographer and patron of DaDaFest.
- Liz Carr - actor, stand-up comedian, broadcaster and international disability rights activist.
- Sir Bert Massie CBE - Former Chairman of the Disability Rights Commission and is a patron of DaDaFest.
- Julie McNamara - artist, writer and patron of DaDaFest.
- Kaite O'Reilly - Writer, Playwright, Dramaturg, Director, teacher and identifies herself as a disability artist. She is also a patron of DaDaFest.

== Awards ==
- 2005 - Merseyside Tourism Award for Best Small Event.
- 2008 - Shortlisted 'Best Event in 2008' (Mersey Tourism Awards)
- 2008 - 'Putting the North West on the map' (Art 08 Awards)
- 2012 - Lever Award - In 2012 DaDaFest won the coveted £10,000 Lever Prize established by the North West Business Leadership Team.
