= Mandy Colleran =

British comedian and disability arts activist (born 1962)

- Born: 7 July 1962 (age 63)
- Occupations: Comic, writer, actress and disability arts activist
- Known for: Former director of DaDaFest
- Awards: 2007 Lifetime Achievement award from DaDaFest

Mandy Colleran (born 7 July 1962) is a comic, writer, actress and disability arts activist.

== Career ==
Mandy Colleran has been involved in disability arts since the 1980s. She is a member of the comedy trio No Excuses along with Mandy Redvers-Rowe and Ali Briggs. In 1986 Colleran became Joint Development Officer of Arts Integration Merseyside (AIM) with John McGrath, it later became North West Disability Arts Forum (NWDAF). In 1990 Colleran became a director of NWDAF.

== Credits ==
Stage

- 2009 DaDaFest Awards, Liverpool (co-presenter)
- 2017 In Water I'm Weightless by Kaite O'Reilly. Directed by John McGrath, movement by Nigel Charnock.

Television

- 1995 The Alphabet Soup Show (BBC)

Film

- Mandy Redvers-Rowe (writer/performer), Ali Briggs (writer/performer) and Mandy Colleran (writer/performer), Bren O'Callahan (director), Astra Films (filmmaker) (10 May 2015). I Know My Place by Still No Excuses (Video). No Excuses Cabaret via YouTube.

== Awards ==
- 2007 Lifetime Achievement award from DaDaFest
