= Dorothy Lawrence =

English journalist (c.1888 – 1964)

Sapper Dorothy Lawrence
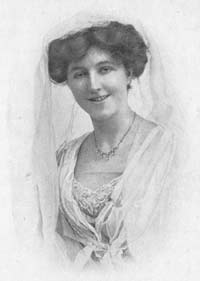
- Lawrence c. 1910 to 1919
- Born: Annie Dorothy Brown Elliott; 26 January 1888; Fulham, Middlesex, England
- Died: 29 August 1964 (aged 76); Friern Hospital, Barnet, England
- Resting place: Plot AH202, New Southgate Cemetery & Crematorium, Barnet
- Monuments: NEW: at New Southgate, unveiled 5th November 2025, erected by the Royal Engineers Association (REA)
- Other name: aka Private Denis Smith
- Occupation: Journalist
- Years active: 1911–1925
- Employer: Freelance
- Known for: Only known English woman soldier with British troops at the frontline during World War I
- Notable work: Sapper Dorothy Lawrence: The Only English Woman Soldier
- Relatives: maternal uncle George Elliott (British politician)

Dorothy Lawrence (26 January 1888 - 29 August 1964) was an English journalist who posed as a male soldier to report from the front line during World War I. In 1915, she went to France, where she managed to obtain a military uniform and a false identity.

Upon her arrival in Albert, Somme, she found a soldier - Royal Engineers Sapper Tommy Dunn - who took her to the front lines. However, trench life affected her health, and after ten days, she revealed her sex, afraid that if she needed medical attention her true identity would be discovered and those who helped her would be punished. She was arrested and interrogated, suspected of being a spy or a Camp follower (prostitute). She was then sent home under a strict agreement not to write about her experiences.

After the war, Lawrence published a memoir, but it was highly censored and not very successful. Her health began to fail, and she was committed to a mental institution, where she died 40 years later. In 2003, her story was rediscovered. Her book was reprinted and the Imperial War Museum included her experiences in an exhibition on women at war. Since 2015, several plays and films have been produced based on her story.

== Early life ==
Lawrence was born in Fulham, Middlesex. (Note: Verified new research updates previous birth details) When her mother died on 1 July 1901, Lawrence was adopted by a wealthy and respected Church of England guardian, widowed Mrs Josephine Fitzgerald in Salisbury.

== War correspondent ==
By outbreak of World War One Lawrence had had some articles published in The Times and in Nash's Pall Mall Magazine. She wrote to a number of the Fleet Street newspapers offering her services as a war correspondent. She believed that this would be the best way to gain recognition for her writing skills, but no British newspapers would send a woman to the front lines Western Front (World War One) In fact, they couldn't get access for even experienced male correspondents.

In summer 1915, according to her later book, she purchased a bicycle for £2 and paid another £3 to convey it with her across the English Channel to France. She was rejected from joining the Voluntary Aid Detachment and instead attempted to enter the war zone via the French sector as a freelancer. She was arrested by French Police in Senlis, 2 miles (3.2 km) short of the front line, and ordered to leave. Spending the night sleeping on a haystack in a forest, she returned to Paris, concluding that only by disguising herself as a man would she get her story:

I'll see what an ordinary English girl, without credentials or money can accomplish.

== Transformation ==
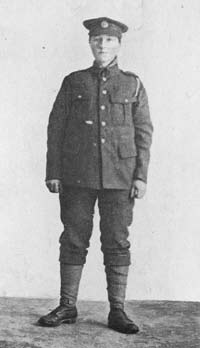
Lawrence post-1918, photographed in the uniform of Private Thomas 'Tom' Dunn, as a soldier of the BEF

Lawrence persuaded two British Army soldiers she met in a Paris café to smuggle her a khaki uniform, piece by piece from their own laundry. She later dubbed the ten men who eventually shared in this exploit her "khaki accomplices". She then practised transforming herself into a male soldier by flattening her figure with a home-made corset, using sacking and cotton-wool to bulk out her shoulders and persuading two Scottish military policemen to cut her hair in a short military style. She darkened her complexion with Condy's Fluid, a disinfectant made from potassium permanganate; scraped the pale skin of her cheeks to produce a shaving rash; and added a tan using shoe polish. Then she asked her soldier friends to teach her how to drill and march.

Wearing a blanket coat and no underwear so no one could discover her abandoned petticoats, she obtained forged identity papers as Private Denis Smith of the 1st Bn, Leicestershire Regiment Service number 175331 and headed for the front lines.

=== Front line ===
She set out for the British sector of the Somme by bicycle. On her journey towards Albert, Somme, she met Lancashire coalminer turned British Expeditionary Force (BEF) tunnel-digging sapper Tom Dunn, who offered to assist her. Fearing for the safety of a lone woman amongst female-companionship starved soldiers, Dunn found Lawrence an abandoned cottage in Senlis Forest to sleep in. During her time on the frontline, she returned there each night to sleep on a damp mattress, fed by any rations that Dunn and his colleagues could spare.

Dunn found her work as a sapper with the 179 Tunnelling Company, 51st Division, Royal Engineers, a specialist mine-laying company that operated within 400 yards (370 m) of the front line.

Lawrence wrote that she was involved in the digging of tunnels. but later evidence and correspondence, from the time after her discovery by British Army authorities, including from the files of Sir Walter Kirke of the BEF's secret service, suggest she did not undertake this highly skilled digging work, although at liberty and working within the trenches. Historian Simon Jones, an expert on the Somme tunnels believes while Lawrence was not physically involved in tunnelling activities at the front line, she was undoubtedly in the trenches.

Physical stress of trench conditions led Lawrence to develop constant chills and rheumatism, then fainting fits. After ten days of service, to protect the men who had helped her, she revealed herself as female and the commanding sergeant promptly placed her under arrest.

=== Return to England ===
Taken to the BEF headquarters and interrogated as a spy by a colonel, she was declared a prisoner of war. From there she was taken by horse-back, cross country to Third Army headquarters in Calais, where she was interrogated by six generals and approximately twenty other officers. She was ignorant of the term camp follower (one meaning of which is "prostitute") and later recalled, "We talked steadily at cross purposes. On my side I had not been informed what the term meant, and on their side they continued unaware that I remained ignorant! So I often appeared to be telling lies."

From Calais she was taken to Saint-Omer and further interrogated. The Army was embarrassed that a woman had breached security and was fearful of more women attempting male roles during the war if her story got out. Fearing she might divulge sensitive intelligence, a judge ordered that she would remain in France until after the imminent Battle of Loos. Confined at the Convent de Bon Pasteur, she was also made to swear not to write about her experiences and signed an affidavit to that effect to keep from being sent to jail. Sent back to London, she travelled across the English Channel on the same ferry as activist Emmeline Pankhurst, who asked her to speak at a suffragette meeting.

In London she attempted to write about her experiences for The Wide World Magazine, but had to scrap her first book on the instructions of the War Office which invoked D.O.R.A. the 1914 Defence of the Realm Act to silence her. She later commented:

In making that promise I sacrificed the chance of earning by newspaper articles written on this escapade, as a girl compelled to earn her livelihood.

== Medals ==
The National Archives (TNA) holds two medal index cards for Lawrence confirming her participation in the war: one showing her rank of Sapper with the Royal Engineers and another [debatably a different Dorothy Lawrence) as a Worker in the Queen Mary's Army Auxiliary Corps

== Later life ==
In 1919, she moved to Canonbury Islington, and published an account of her experiences: Sapper Dorothy Lawrence: The Only English Woman Soldier. Although well received in England, America and Australia, it was heavily censored by the War Office, and it did not become the commercial success that she hoped for.

By 1925, her increasingly erratic behaviour was brought to the attention of the authorities. After confiding to a doctor that she had suffered sexual assault as a teenager and with no contact from Mrs Fitzgerald or other family to care for her, she was institutionalised. Committed first to the London County Mental Hospital at Hanwell in March 1925, she was later a patient at the Colney Hatch Lunatic Asylum in Friern Barnet, north London.

== Death and burial ==
Reportedly, she had no visitors until she died nearly 40 years later, of cerebral thrombosis aged 67 on 29 August 1964, at what was by then known as Friern Hospital. She was buried in a public pauper grave at New Southgate Cemetery.

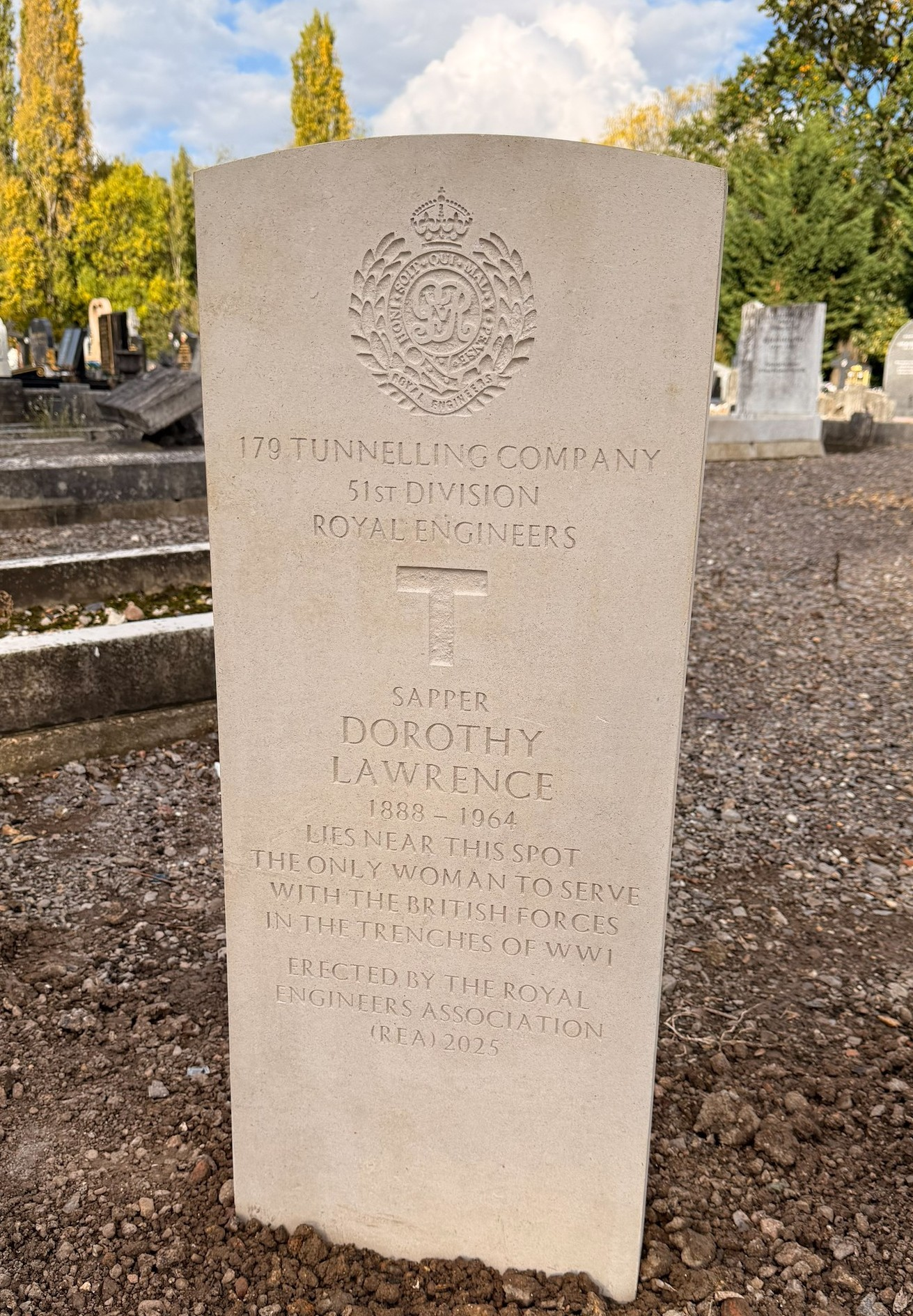
Dorothy Lawrence grave marker unveiled 5th November 2025

== Memorial ==
On 5 November 2025 the Royal Engineers Association (REA) the Sappers Charity, unveiled a grave marker installed by Steve Davies, Military Grave Restorer. and crafted by London stonemasons Munday & Son As part of its Remembrance Day 2025 coverage, on 11 November 2025, BBC Breakfast News dedicated a news segment to the unveiling of the memorial.

== Legacy ==
In 2003, Richard Bennett, the grandson of Richard Samson Bennett – one of the soldiers who had helped Lawrence in France – found her autobiography while researching his family history at the Royal Engineers Museum (REM) in Chatham, Kent.

On further investigation, West Sussex historian Raphael Stipic found a letter written during World War I by Sir Walter Kirke, head of the secret service for the British Expeditionary Force. The letter mentioned a woman who dressed in men's clothing in hopes of becoming a war correspondent, pointing clearly to Lawrence.

During his tenure as a curator at the Royal Engineers Museum (REM) historian Simon Jones found a copy of Lawrence's book in the archives and began collecting notes to write a biography. Jones later found Lawrence's sexual assault allegations included in her medical records, held in the London Metropolitan Archives of Saint Bernard's Hospital although not available for general access.

Lawrence's story later became part of an Imperial War Museum (IWM) exhibition covering women at war. Curator Laura Clouting stated that Lawrence was included because she was the exception to the rule that women were not included in any branch of the military.

== Cultural legacy ==
Several plays and films have been produced based on Lawrence's story, with others currently - November 2025 - in post-production:

- The Disappearance of Dorothy Lawrence (2015), play written by Julie McNamara and directed by Paulette Randall.
- Blue Pen (2016), film by McNamara based on the stories of Lawrence and other women journalists whose voices were silenced through censorship, confinement in institutions, and abuse.
- Over the Top: the true-life tale of Dorothy Lawrence (2016), play written and directed by Lizzie Crarer, a production of theatre company The Heroine Project Presents, which offers stories of women who have been overlooked in history.
- After a trustee of the Historical Association (HA) saw a performance of Over the Top, the HA commissioned the theatre company to create three short films about Lawrence to use in classroom discussions about World War I. The films were posted on the HA website in May 2017.
- "Sapper Smith" (2018) was produced by Emily Morales, Writer-Producer, then a pre-graduate Master of Arts (MA) in Filmmaking, student at Goldsmiths University, London, in collaboration with fellow students, Slovenian Award-Winning Director-Actor, Vida Breže, and German Producer, Liza Jane Wiedemann.

== Sources ==
- Dorothy Lawrence (1919), Sapper Dorothy Lawrence: the only English woman soldier, Late Royal Engineers 51st Division 179th Tunnelling Company BEF, London:Lane. Available in-full online, includes additional pictures. Reissued in hardcover ISBN 978-0857061362 and paperback ISBN 978-0857061355 as Sapper Dorothy: the Only English Woman Soldier in the Royal Engineers 51st Division, 79th (sic) Tunnelling Co. During the First World War by Leonaur, 2010.
