= New Southgate Cemetery =

Cemetery in Barnet, Greater London, England

Coordinates: 51.6240°N 0.1441°W

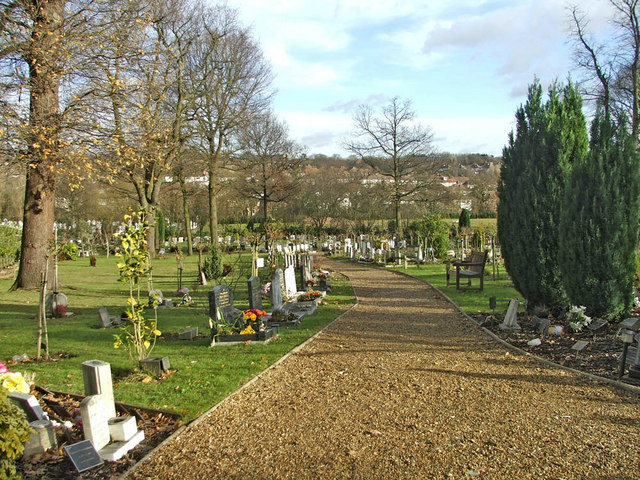
New Southgate Cemetery looking East

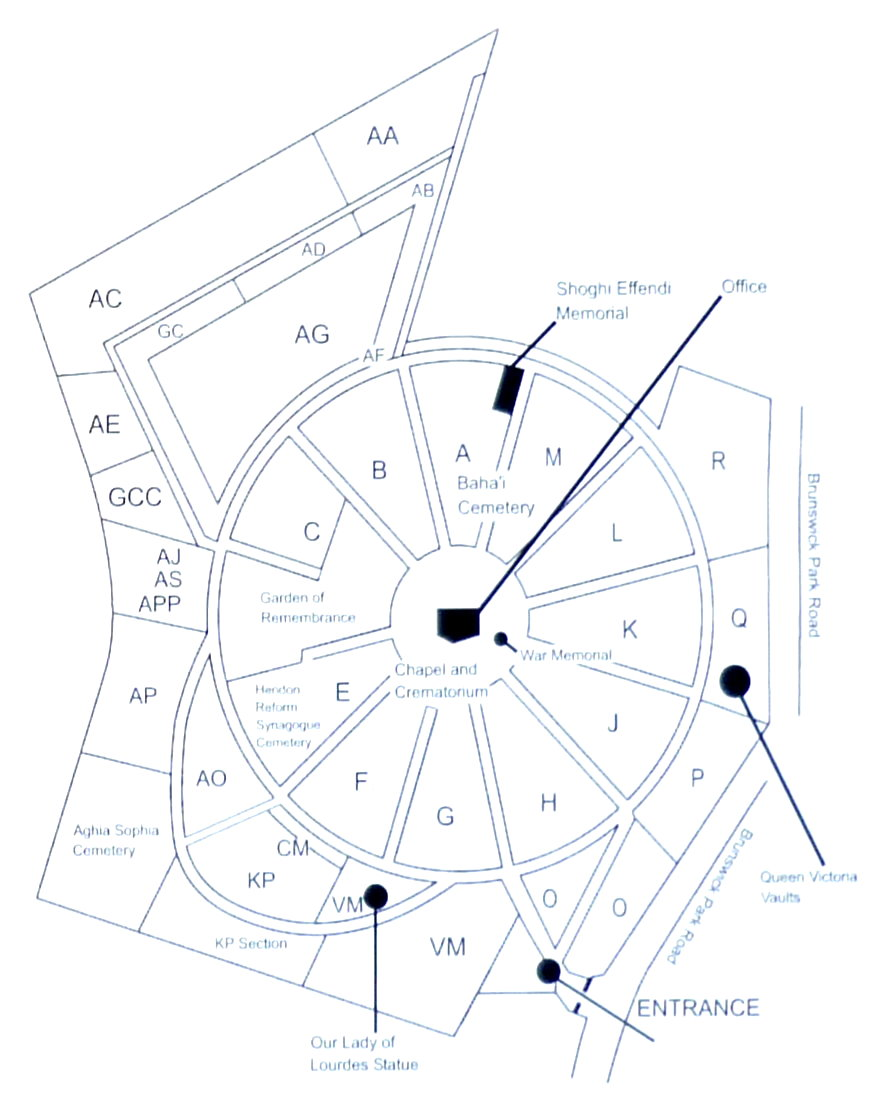
The cemetery was laid out on a spoke and wheel plan by Alexander Spurr.

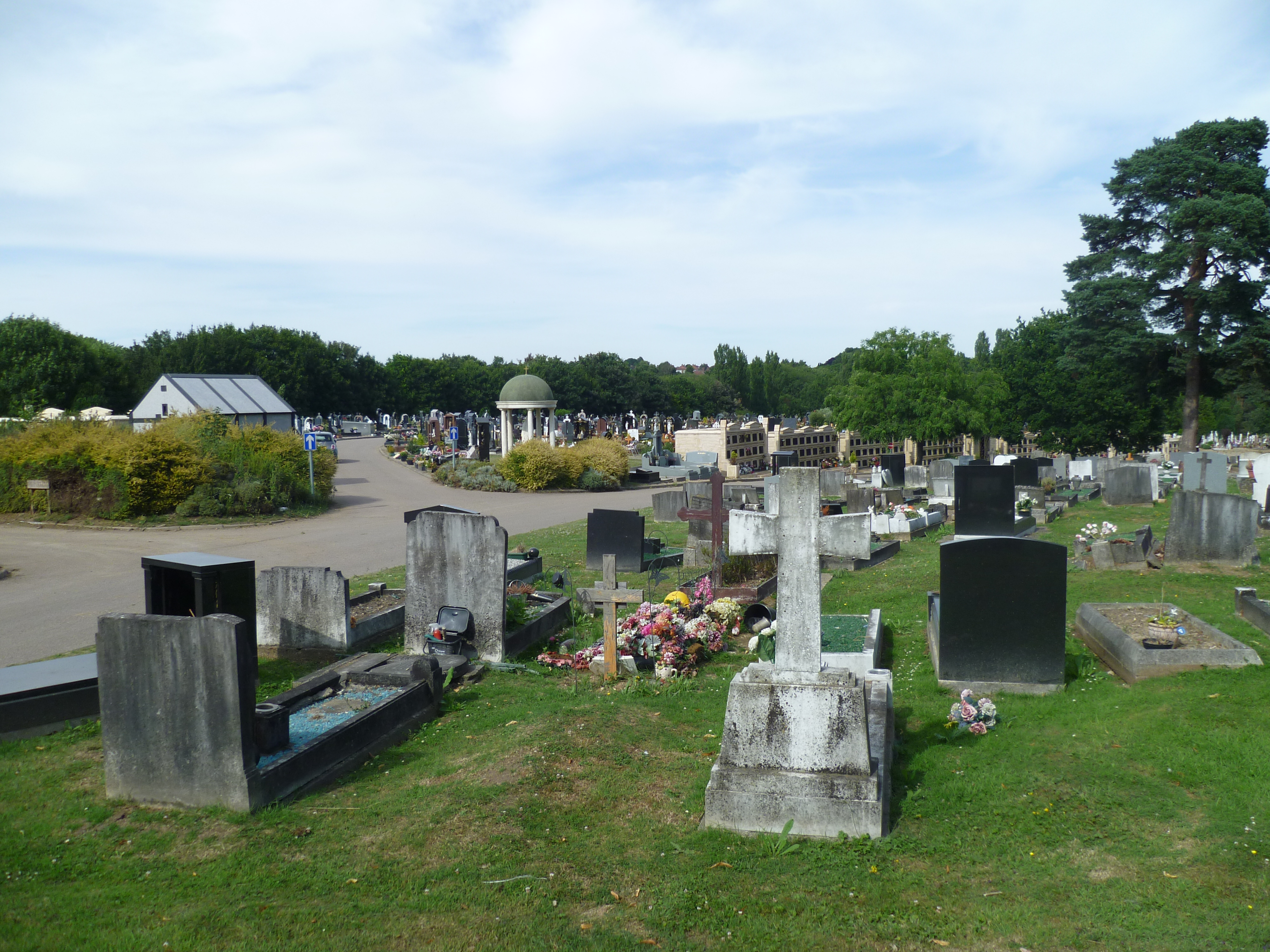
View of the cemetery

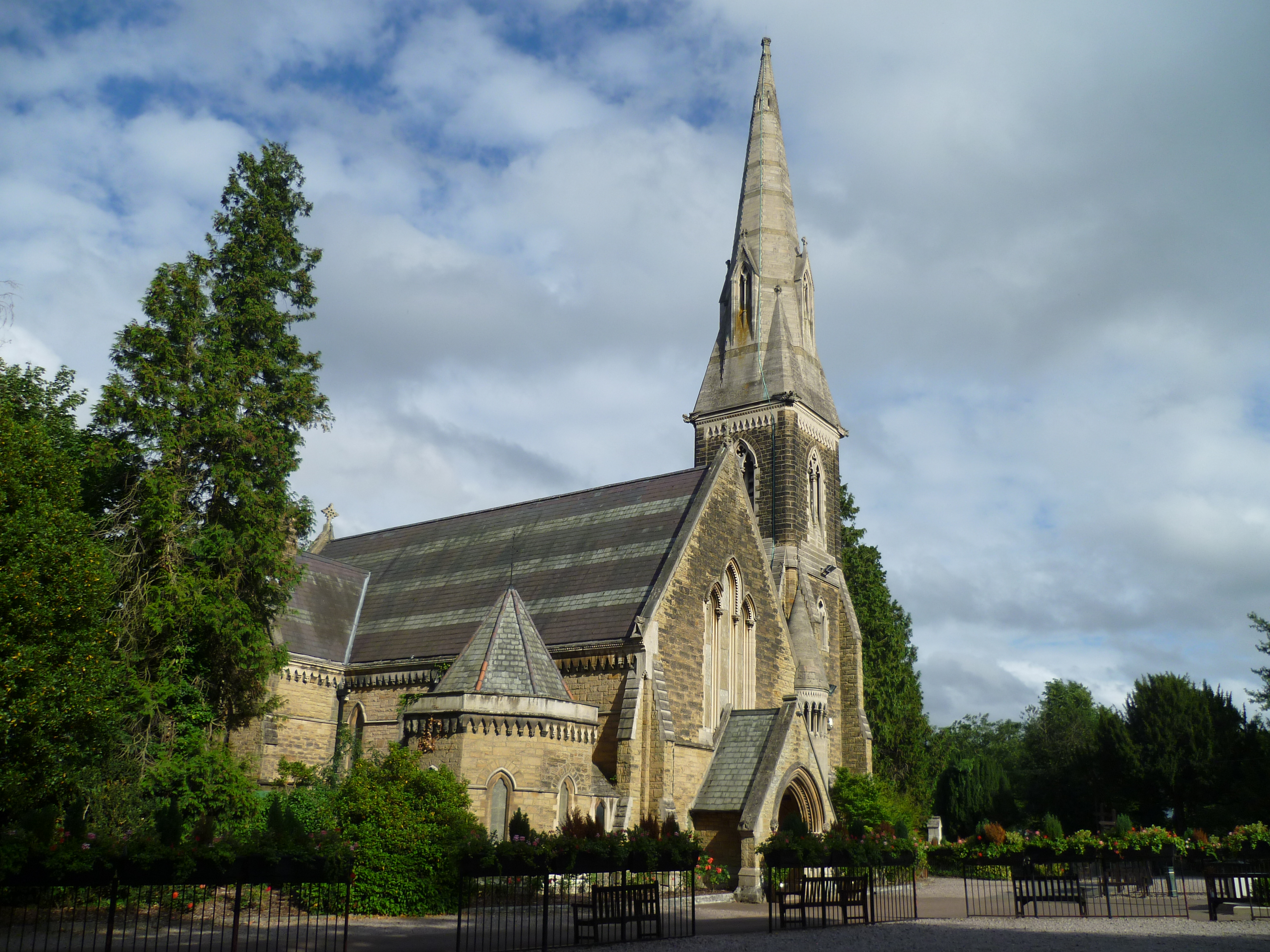
The chapel at New Southgate Cemetery designed by Alexander Spurr.

New Southgate Cemetery (also known as Brunswick Park Cemetery) is a 22-hectare cemetery in Brunswick Park in the London Borough of Barnet. It was established by the Colney Hatch Company in the 1850s and became the Great Northern London Cemetery, with a railway service running from near Kings Cross station to a dedicated station at the cemetery, similar to the service of the London Necropolis Company to Brookwood Cemetery in Surrey.

The railway service to Great Northern London Cemetery soon closed, but the cemetery has remained open.

== Great Northern Cemetery ==
After the closure of burial grounds in central London in the 1850s, there was a movement to establish new cemeteries further from the centre of the city. The Cemeteries Clauses Act 1847 allowed for the creation of commercial cemeteries, expanded upon by the Burial Act 1852.

The Colney Hatch Company acquired land for a cemetery near Colney Hatch (now known as New Southgate; the name was later changed to avoid association with the nearby Colney Hatch Lunatic Asylum). Originally intended to cover 200 acres (80 ha), the cemetery eventually reached covered 150 acres (60 ha).

Great Northern London Cemetery Act 1855
- Act of Parliament
- Parliament of the United Kingdom
- Long title: An Act for making and maintaining the Great Northern London Cemetery, and for other Purposes.
- Citation: 18 & 19 Vict. c. clix

Dates
- Royal assent: 23 July 1855

Other legislation
- Repealed by: Great Northern London Cemetery Act 1976

Status: Repealed

Text of statute as originally enacted

Great Northern London Cemetery Act 1876
- Act of Parliament
- Parliament of the United Kingdom
- Long title: An Act for anthorising the Great Northern London Cemetery Company to dispose of their superfluous lands; and for other purposes.
- Citation: 39 & 40 Vict. c. ccxvii

Dates
- Royal assent: 11 August 1876

Other legislation
- Amended by: Great Northern London Cemetery Act 1896
- Repealed by: Great Northern London Cemetery Act 1976

Status: Repealed

Text of statute as originally enacted

Great Northern London Cemetery Act 1896
- Act of Parliament
- Parliament of the United Kingdom
- Long title: An Act to amend the Great Northern London Cemetery Act 1876 in reference to the disposal of superfluous lands and for other purposes.
- Citation: 59 & 60 Vict. c. xxxix

Dates
- Royal assent: 2 July 1896

Other legislation
- Amends: Great Northern London Cemetery Act 1876
- Repealed by: Great Northern London Cemetery Act 1976

Status: Repealed

Text of statute as originally enacted

Great Northern London Cemetery (Crematorium) Act 1953
- Act of Parliament
- Parliament of the United Kingdom
- Long title: An Act to authorise the Great Northern London Cemetery Company to establish a crematorium to empower the said Company to raise additional capital and for other purposes.
- Citation: 1 & 2 Eliz. 2. c. xii

Dates
- Royal assent: 6 May 1953

Text of statute as originally enacted

Great Northern London Cemetery Company Act 1961
- Act of Parliament
- Parliament of the United Kingdom
- Long title: An Act to authorise the Great Northern London Cemetery Company to sell certain lands; and for other purposes.
- Citation: 9 & 10 Eliz. 2. c. xiii

Dates
- Royal assent: 9 May 1961

Other legislation
- Repealed by: Great Northern London Cemetery Act 1976

Status: Repealed

Text of statute as originally enacted

Great Northern London Cemetery Company Act 1968
- Act of Parliament
- Parliament of the United Kingdom
- Long title: An Act to authorise the Great Northern London Cemetery Company to sell certain land belonging to the said Company free from restrictions; to authorise the erection of buildings thereon; and for other purposes.
- Citation: 1968 c. xxvii

Dates
- Royal assent: 26 July 1968

Other legislation
- Repealed by: Great Northern London Cemetery Act 1976

Status: Repealed

Text of statute as originally enacted

Great Northern London Cemetery Act 1976
- Act of Parliament
- Parliament of the United Kingdom
- Long title: An Act to confirm an agreement between the Great Northern London Cemetery Company and New Southgate Cemetery and Crematorium Limited for the reorganisation and future administration of the cemetery administered by the first-mentioned company under the Great Northern London Cemetery Acts 1855 to 1968; to confer powers on the second-mentioned company with respect to the said cemetery; to authorise the first-mentioned company to dispose of surplus lands; and for other purposes.
- Citation: 1976 c. xxvii

Dates
- Royal assent: 12 October 1976

Text of statute as originally enacted

The cemetery is located about 1 mile (1.6 km) north of Colney Hatch Station, now New Southgate railway station, which is about 7 miles (11 km) on the Great Northern Railway main line north of King's Cross station, which had opened in 1850, only a few years before the cemetery. The Great Northern London Cemetery Company was formed as a joint venture between the Great Northern Railway Company and the Colney Hatch Company under a local act of Parliament, the Great Northern London Cemetery Act 1855 (18 & 19 Vict. c. clix). with a view to providing cheap and convenient burial services to the residents of central London.

A similar service was established in 1854 by the London Necropolis Company, running from London Necropolis railway station near Waterloo station to Brookwood Cemetery near Woking, Surrey, but the 23-mile (37 km) journey took around 45 minutes compared to 15 minutes between Kings Cross and Colney Hatch.

The Great Northern London Cemetery Company aimed at the lower end of the market, charging 6 shillings to carry a coffin, and plus a return fare of 1s 6d for each mourner, plus another fee for burial, starting at 10s or 11s. The fees for burial at Brookwood Cemetery started at over £1.

A siding was built next to the main line north of King's Cross station with a separate station building (Great Northern Cemetery Station) off Maiden Lane (now York Way). The station included a wedge-shaped spire, and gothic arches, built above a retaining wall beside the railway line in a cutting below. It included a mortuary – intended to avoid the unhygienic storage of cadavers at the deceased's family home – and facilities for mourners, with a lift to carry coffins down to the tracks.

Rail services began in 1861 and ran twice a week to Southgate & Colney Hatch (now New Southgate) station; north of the station, a single railway track ran to a terminus to the west of East Barnet Lane (later renamed Brunswick Park Road), beside the cemetery, where there were waiting rooms and chapels. The cemetery was laid out by Alexander Spurr in a concentric plan around a Gothic chapel with a 150 feet (46 m) high spire.

The rail service closed two years after it started, due to lack of profitability, and the station with its chapel were demolished after 1912. A Standard Telephones and Cables factory was built on the former location of the station in 1922; the site now forms part of North London Business Park.

== New Southgate Cemetery ==
Although the rail service ceased, the cemetery remained open for burials. It was later renamed New Southgate Cemetery.

In 1876, a plot was reserved for the exclusive use of Queen Victoria for the reinterment of the remains from the St Marienkirche Lutheran Chapel in Savoy Precinct which was demolished in 1875 to improve access to the newly created Victoria Embankment on the edges of the River Thames. The area is known as the Savoy Vaults or Queen Victoria Vaults.

Later burials include the cemetery's architect and superintendent Alexander Spurr (died 1873) and writer Ross McWhirter (1925–1975).

Perhaps the most famous person buried at the cemetery is Shoghi Effendi (1897–1957), the Guardian of the Baháʼí Faith, who died on a visit to London in 1957 and, in accordance with the faith, was buried near the place of his death at New Southgate Cemetery.

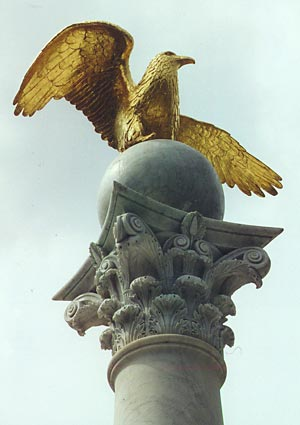
Monument at the resting place of Shoghi Effendi

Dorothy Lawrence (1888–1964), a female journalist aka Sapper Dorothy Lawrence who posed as a male soldier on the Western Front in World War I, died in 1964 at Friern Hospital and was buried in an unmarked pauper's grave in the cemetery. On 5 November 2025, a grave marker commissioned by the Royal Engineers Association, the Sapper Charity, was installed at the spot. Relatives of Dorothy Lawrence attended the memorial event, which was filmed and broadcast by BBC Breakfast News as part of its Remembrance Day 2025 coverage.

Other burials include statesman Richard Bethell (1800–1873), physician Alfred Baring Garrod (1819–1907), sculptor Thomas Stirling Lee (1857–1916), songwriter Fred W. Leigh (1871–1924), and criminal Tony Lambrianou (1942–2004).

Since the 1950s, New Southgate Cemetery has become the burial place for the North London Greek Cypriot community. The Greek Orthodox area was developed in 1998 and named after the Reverend Kyriacou Petrou, a local priest, who is also buried in this section.

The cemetery was acquired by New Southgate Cemetery and Crematorium Company in 1993. It now includes sections for Roman Catholic, Greek Orthodox, and Caribbean burials. Parts of the land that once formed part of the cemetery grounds are now a modern housing estate.

The cemetery is a Site of Borough Importance for Nature Conservation, Grade II. The Pymmes Brook Trail runs along the eastern boundary.

In later years a crematorium was also opened here.

== War graves ==
The cemetery contains war graves of 109 Commonwealth service personnel, two Belgian soldiers, and 51 German prisoners who were buried from the Alexandra Palace Internment Camp in World War I, besides 86 Commonwealth service war graves from World War II. A Cross of Sacrifice stands in front of the cemetery chapel. Those Commonwealth service personnel whose graves could not be marked by headstones are listed on a Screen Wall memorial for those of World War I and a Kerb Wall memorial for those of World War II. The monument to the German internees is a grade II listed structure.

== In popular culture ==
- The climax of the spinoff film That's Your Funeral, which sees the mourners and undertakers getting stoned from breathing in the smoke from cannabis being incinerated in the crematorium after Ezra Taylor's funeral ceremony, was filmed here.

== See also ==
- Nature reserves in Barnet
