= Melanie Bonajo =

Dutch director and filmmaker (born 1978)

- Born: 13 November 1978 (age 47); Heerlen, Netherlands

Melanie Bonajo (they/them) is a queer, non-binary, Dutch artist, filmmaker, feminist, sexological bodyworker, somatic sex coach and educator, cuddle workshop facilitator and animal rights activist. Through their videos, performances, photographs and installations, Bonajo examines current conundrums of co-existence in a crippling capitalistic systems, and address themes of eroding intimacy and isolation in an increasingly sterile, technological world.

They research how technological advances and commodity based pleasures increase feelings of alienation, removing a sense of belonging in an individual, and their works present anti-capitalist methods to reconnect, explore sexualities, intimacies and feelings. Their experimental documentaries often explore communities living or working on the margins of society, either through illegal means or cultural exclusion, and the paradoxes inherent to ideas of comfort with a strong sense for community, equality, and body-politics. Their work has been exhibited and screened internationally, from the Tate Modern, MoMA PS1, to De Appel Arts Centre and Stedelijk Museum in Amsterdam to Manifesta 12, the Gwanjou Biennale, the Center for Contemporary Art, Warsaw, the Kunsthalle Basel, International Documentary Film Festival Amsterdam (IDFA), the Berlinale, the International Film Festival Rotterdam, and Treefort Film Fest.

== Notable work ==
Bonajo's film series Night Soil is a trio of experimental documentaries about modern approaches to nature and the cultural implications of acting against capitalism. The first in the series, Night Soil - Fake Paradise, is about psychedelic plant medication, human-plant conversations and how ancient rituals of indigenous descent can be translated to urban environments. The video pays close attention to the female voice, which has traditionally been neglected in psychedelic research. In the sequel, Night Soil - Economy of Love, a women's activist movement approaches sex work as a way for femmes to reclaim their power in a male-dominated pleasure zone. Their emphasis is on nurturing, educating and empowering all sexes around the power that lays within the female orgasm. The third film, "Night Soil - Nocturnal Gardening," considers how communities come together through alternative and pre-colonial uses of land. Structured around four central storylines, the video explores indigenous land rights, off-the-grid subsistence, racism and injustice in the food system and the consequences of consumer behaviour on farm animals centering female activists.

Progress vs. Regress, which premiered at Hacking Habitat, is the first in a trilogy that questions how technology has changed social relationships through the eyes of centenarians in the Netherlands. This film was also selected for IDFA (International Documentary Film Festival Amsterdam) 2016. The film Progress vs Sunsets (2017) examines extinction or the endangerment of vulnerable groups through techno-capital development, but also extinction in an abstract sense, such as that of feelings and thoughts. Through the eyes and voices of children, the film illustrates the complicated issues around animal rights, bio-politics, dwindling resources, ecology, anthropomorphism in which Nature, as the ultimate “other” is seen as a utilitarian object outside of ourselves, and the implications these ethics have on human desires, emotions, emotiveness and sentimentality towards ‘the others”.

Bonajo's most recent film TouchMETell (2019) initiates a discussion with children about boundaries, gender roles, physical autonomy and intimacy and the lack of physical contact in this digital age, where we seem to have forgotten the language of our bodies.

== Feminism and activism ==
Bonajo's Furniture Bondage photography series pairs domestic tools with the naked female body. In 2012 they initiated Genital International, a feminist performance collective event about participation and equality. Bonajo's photography series and music video work Pee on Presidents is often tied to the recent anti-censorship and sex-positive branches of the feminist movement for its endorsement of female body agency in public environments, resulting in a provocation of censorship laws in the media.

As a psychedelic eco-feminist using technology, Bonajo's activism extends into our relationship with the natural world, using gender as a lens to engage with ecology, spirituality and the body politic. Increasingly it is addressed towards nature and the rights of non-human persons, as manifested in the Matrix Botanica — Non-Human Persons publication, and Matrix Botanica — Biosphere above Nations (2013) film. This performance and film explores the absurd construction of placing human identity “outside” nature. This work re-shapes contemporary human/plant/animal rituals in a desacralized global society, and examines remaking relations with nature on the basis of recognising them not as “things” but as creative, self-directed, originative others. In addition to the film, they also shows how the symbol of nature and animal has drastically changed over the years in a publication entitled Matrix Botanica. This revised version of the magazine makes visible the way our relationship to nature has changed through the popularization of amateur-nature photography on the internet.

== Embodiment and sexuality ==
Bonajo is a certified Somatic Sex Coach and International Cuddle Workshop Facilitator. Their work is based on the principle that when we expand our pleasure ceiling by practicing knowledge around our own body's needs and boundaries, increase sensitivity through presence and cultivate new language, we also create more nuance, depth and safety in our relationship with others. Touch is their anti-capitalist medication to re-negotiate intimacy and body connections in a safe(r) space to counter the epidemic of loneliness and the erosion of our feelings. This is apparent in Skinship_, a touch-based place for kinship_, initiated by Mel. It is a collective run queer/trans/non-binary/genderfluids/agenders/genderexpansive and femme centering space restructuring and re-prioritizing the body as a vehicle for connection and safety, cultivating touch, pleasure, sexuality, playfulness, consent, boundaries and friendship as a form of activism. In 2020, the Skinship collaborated with several educators to offer 21 Days of Selfpleasure, a queer and pagan self love advent calendar.

In 2021, Mel collaborated with KABK on the Wxtchcraft Studium Generale talk series, which featured Silvia Federici, Adriene Maree Brown, Staci Haines, Starhawk and more. This curriculum stands opposed to the commodified and tamed cultural representation of the witch, and in opposition to purely rational, scientific reason with its many tools of oppression.

== Music and performance ==
Bonajo has performed internationally at venues such as Paradiso in Amsterdam, Baby's Alright in NYC and Collège des Bernardins in Paris alongside artists such as Kembra Pfahler and Bianca Cassidy of CocoRosie. Their band, ZaZaZoZo, is a music project with Joseph Marzolla known for its spacatronic folk sound and animalistic influence. All their music is produced by Bonajo's brother Tommie Bonajo at his Tomster studios. They released their debut album INUA in spring 2013 by Tsunami Addiction. More recently Bonajo collaborated with Michael Behari to create a vinyl record entitled Single Mother Songs on the End of Nature, published by Bonnefanten Museum. Boundary Boss by Bonajo, Splitter Splatter and Friends is the follow-up, released in 2020, and addresses children on having ownership over their personal boundaries for a healthy solid sense of self and self-esteem in a post–Me Too movement era.

== Current ==
Bonajo released their first major publication since Spheres in December 2015 Matrix Botanica Nonhuman Persons designed by Experimental Jetset, which explores the ways we experience nature through representations on the internet, via YouTube and blogs posting adorable, funny or adorably sad amateur videos and photographs of nonhuman animals. This publication delves into the ways nature education has changed over the years and integrates the voices of animal behavior scientists rather than a National Geographic perspective.

In 2020 Bonajo was selected to represent The Netherlands at the 59th Venice Biennale, 2022. They will be working with a curatorial team consisting of Maaike Orlando Gouwenberg, Geir Haraldseth and Soraya Pol. The work will be presented at the Chiesetta della Misericordia in the Cannaregio neighbourhood in Venice.

== Selected works ==
=== Filmography ===
- 2020 Boundary Boss with Splitter Splatter & Friends
- 2019 TouchMETell
- 2018 Progress vs Sunsets
- 2016 Night Soil - Nocturnal Gardening
- 2016 Progress vs Regress
- 2015 Night Soil - Economy of Love
- 2014 Night Soil - Fake Paradise
- 2014 Woke Up As A Wolf ZaZaZoZo
- 2013 Pee on Presidents
- 2013 Matrix Botanica - Biosphere Above Nations

=== Discography ===
- 2018 Melanie Bonajo - Single Mother Songs from the End of Nature, with Michael Beharie
- 2016 Matrix Botanica - How to Escape from an Elderly Home Method 2016, with Tommie Bonajo
- 2014 ZaZaZoZo - Woke up as a Wolf
- 2013 ZaZaZoZo - Inua (Tsunami Addiction)

=== Publications ===
- 2020 The Coven (Self Published), In collaboration with Harmon Fries
- 2020 The Art of Feminism, Night Soil – Economy of Love (Elephant Book Company)
- 2015 Matrix Botanica - Non Human Persons (Capricious Publishing, designed by Experimental Jetset)
- 2014 Pee on Presidents, (Self Publish Be Happy)
- 2012 SPHERES, (Spheres Publications)
- 2012 One Room, Nine Possible Answers, Three Rooms (Self published)
- 2009 Volkerschau Zine (Capricious publishing)
- 2009 Furniture Bondage (Kodoijpress)
- 2009 Bush Compulsion, A Primitive Breakthrough in the Modern Mind (Museumpaper)
- 2009 I have a Room with Everything (Capricious Publishing)
- 2007 Modern Life of the Soul (Artist Book)
- 2005 I have a room with everything (Capricious)

=== Events and curatorial ===
- 2021 Wxtchcraft KABK Studium Generale talk series, online
- 2020 Self Love Advent Calendar
- 2020 Skinship: A Touch-based Place for Kinship
- 2019 Party Melanie Bonajo's Massage Mayhem Sexyland, Amsterdam, NL
- 2015 QQC Performance Festival, Paradiso, Amsterdam, NL
- 2015 Night Soil Musical Celebration of our Sexual Psychedelic Power with Bunny Michael, Baby's All Right, NYC
- 2014 HOODOO ∆ VOODOO, Collège des Bernardins, Paris
- 2014 The Feeling Internet, Mediamatic, Amsterdam
- 2014 Qu'est-ce que C'est?, Paradiso, Amsterdam

=== Solo shows ===
- 2019 TouchMETell, Rabo Lab, Stedelijk Museum Amsterdam, NL
- 2019 Progress vs. Sunsets, Kunsthalle Lingen, DE
- 2018 The Death of Melanie Bonajo, Bonnefantenmuseum, NL
- 2017 Melanie Bonajo: Single Mother Songs from the End of Nature - Night Soil Trilogy, Frankfurter Kunstverein, Frankfurt
- 2016 Next Level: Melanie Bonajo - Night Soil, Foam, Amsterdam
- 2015 Night Soil - Economy of Love, Akinci Gallery, Amsterdam
- 2015 Company Gallery, NYC
- 2013 Matrix Botanica; Biosphere above Nations, Museum de Paviljoens, Almere
- 2011 86 details of Paradise, Outline, Amsterdam
- 2009 The Grand Exploring Soul and the Point where History Failed, Rijksakdemie Open, Amsterdam

=== Group shows ===
- 2022 COME ALIVE, curated by Ine Gevers and Morgan Catalina (Niet Normaal INT), Utrecht, NL
- 2022 pornotopia revised, curated by Sarah Held & Sylvia Sadzinski, Vienna, AT
- 2021 Modern Love curated by Katerina Gregos, Tallinn Art Hall, EE
- 2021 A I S T I T / coming to our senses, Berlin, Brussels, London, Paris, Helsinki (multiple locations)
- 2021 TBA 21 Thyssen Bornemisza Art Contemporary / St*age, curated by Chus Martinez
- 2021 Point of No Return, NART Annual Exhibition, curated by Saskia Lillepuu, Narva, EE
- 2021 Vrijdenkers, curated by Nathalie Faber, Amsterdam, NL
- 2021 Phantom, curated by Francesca Corona, Rome, IT
- 2021 Listening to Voices, Futura Centre for Contemporary Art, curated by Caroline Krzyszton, Prague, CZ
- 2021 Centre Photographique Rouen Normandie, Rouen, FR
- 2021 From a Grain of Dust to the Cosmos, curated by Baron Rosenkrantz, Ishoj, DK
- 2021 Potential Agrarianisms, Kunsthalle Bratislava, SK
- 2021 Flowers in Art, curated by Dea Antonsen, Ishøj, DK
- 2021 Rauw. De afkeer van idealisering, Rembrandthuis, Amsterdam, NL
- 2021 Rettet den Wald!, curated by Anne Berk, Nijmegen, NL
- 2021 Kunstenfestival Watou, curated by Benedicte Goesaert, Poperinge, BE
- 2021 Come Back as a Flower, Helsinki Art Museum, FI
- 2021 Phantom, curated by Francesca Corona, Rome, IT
- 2021 The Institute of Things to Come, curated by Valerio del Baglivo, Torino, IT
- 2021 Joseph Beuys und die Shamanen curated by Barbara Strieder, Oliver Kretschmann, Museum Schloss Moyland, Bedburg – Hau, DL
- 2020 Musrara Festival curated by Vera Korman and Dana Sahar, Jerusalem, IL
- 2020 On Earth – imaging, technology and the natural world Le Lieu Unique, Nantes, FR
- 2020 Empathie. Geen mens is een eiland curated by Imke Ruigrok, Museum Ijsselstijn, NL
- 2020 Bodies of Water. The 13th Shanghai Biennale curated by Andrés Jaque, Power Station of Art, Shanghai, CN
- 2020 Modern Love curated by Katerina Gregos, Museum für Neue Kunst, Freiburg, DE
- 2020 MAKING KIN Kunsthaus Hamburg, DE
- 2020 Kunsthaus Dresden, DE
- 2020 Modern Love (or Love in the Age of Cold Intimacies) Museum für Neue Kunst Freiburg, DE
- 2019 TouchMeTell Stedelijk Museum Amsterdam, NL
- 2019 Rencontres d’Arles Arles, FR
- 2019 Do Not Disturb Palais de Tokyo, Paris, FR
- 2019 Progress vs. Sunsets. Re-formulating the Nature Documentary Kunsthalle Lingen, DE
- 2019 Be Fragile! Be Brave! (Night Soil-Economy of Love), curated by Rebeka Põldsam, Pori Museum, FI
- 2019 Vrijheid. Vijftig Nederlandse Kernkunstwerken sinds 1968, curated by Hans den Hartog Jager, Museum de Fundatie, Zwolle, NL
- 2019 Creatures Made to Measure—Animals and Contemporary Design (Progress vs Sunsets), an exhibition by Martha Herford Museum in collaboration with Tanja Seiner, Design Museum, Ghent, BE
- 2018 Exhibition Nam June Paik Awards, 2018, Westfälischer Kunstverein, DE
- 2018 Out of Office, Singer Museum, Laren, NL
- 2018 Een ontembare kracht, Cobra Museum, Amstelveen, NL
- 2018 ABN AMRO collection exhibition, 'Natural' Constructions - curated by Danila Cahen, Circle ART, Amsterdam, NL
- 2018 Genius Loci (Night Soil—Fake Paradise), Parc Saint Léger, Pougues-les-Eaux, FR
- 2018 Creatures Made to Measure—Animals and Contemporary Design (Progress vs Sunsets), Martha Herford Museum, DE
- 2018 Bloot/Exposed, (Peeing on Presidents), Museum Kranenburgh, Bergen, NL
- 2018 Freedom of Movement (Progress vs. Sunsets), Stedelijk Museum, Amsterdam, NL
- 2018 Guangzhou Triennial (Progress vs. Sunsets), Guangzhou Museum of Art, Guangzhou, China
- 2018 Manifesta 12, Palermo, IT
- 2018 Anima Mundi, Museum Boijmans van Beuningen, Rotterdam, NL
- 2018 Haus der Sinnsuche, gutes leben durch Kultur, curated by Ellen Blumenstein, Kunstsaele, Berlin, DE
- 2018 Object Love, de Domijnen, Sittard, NL
- 2018 Riga International Biennial of Contemporary Art (RIBOCA), curated by Katerina Gregos, Riga
- 2018 Reis naar de toekomst, Tussendiepen, Drachten, NL
- 2018 Blind Faith: Between the Visceral and the Cognitive in Contemporary Art, Haus der Kunst, München, DE
- 2017 Ten Days Six Nights, Tate Modern, London
- 2017 Exhibition Prix de Rome 2017, Kunsthal, Rotterdam
- 2017 Homeward Bound, Nicodim gallery, Los Angeles, USA
- 2017 Once more, with feeling, curated by Martine van Kampen, KAF Expo, Almere stad, NL
- 2017 Summer of Love, Schwarz Foundation, curated by Katerina Gregos, Lesbos, GR
- 2017 Ben ik een dier? De Domijnen, Sittard, NL
- 2017 CBK Zeeland, FAÇADE 2017: Face your freedom, Zeeland, NL
- 2017 Screen Present Tense, HDLU, Zagreb
- 2017 Wiener Festwochen - The Conundrum of Imagination, Leopold Museum Vienna, AU
- 2017 Bienne Festival of Photography, Biel, CH
- 2017 Planetary Garden, curated by Ashley Lumb & Laura Mclean, Manuka Arts Centre, AU
- 2017 Artefact Expo: The Act of Magic, curated by Karen Verschooren & Ilse Huygens, STUK, Leuven, BE
- 2017 Living in Dreams, curated by Els Fiers & Frank Koolen, De Bond Brugge, BE
- 2016 Give Me Yesterday, Fondazione Prada, IT
- 2016 Close-Up A New Generation of Film and Video Artists in the Netherlands, EYE Film Institute, Amsterdam, NL
- 2016 Kunsthalle Basel, Basel, CH
- 2016 Hacking Habitat, NL
- 2014 Oude Kerk, Amsterdam, NL

== Awards ==
- 2020 Awarded the Dutch Pavilion at the 59th Venice Biennale
- 2019 Prix Pictet (nominee)
- 2018 Amsterdamprijs voor de Kunst (nominee)
- 2018 Nam June Paik Award (nominee)
- 2017 Prix de Rome (nominee)
- 2017 Campaign Artist for Amsterdam Unseen
- 2016 Shortlisted for the Dutch Pavilion at the 57th Venice Biennale
- 2016 IFFR Tiger Award for short films
- 2015 IFFR Tiger Award for short films (nominee)
- 2014 IFFR Tiger Award for short films (nominee)
- 2013 MK Award
- 2011 C.o.C.a (nominee)
- 2009 Prins Bernhard Cultuurfonds, Peter Paul Peterich Fonds
- 2009 Festival Internationale de la Mode et Photographie
- 2007 PUP Award
- 2006 Berlinale Talent Campus

== Education and residencies ==
- 2020 International Cuddle Workshop Facilitator
- 2019 Somatic Sex Coach and Educator
- 2014 The International Studio & Curatorial Program, New York, USA
- 2009-2010 Rijksakademie voor Beeldende Kunst, Amsterdam, NL
