= Niet Normaal INT =

Niet Normaal INT (NNI) is a Dutch foundation that creates large exhibitions on the topics of Art and Technology, founded by curator and activist Ine Gevers.

== Exhibition Niet Normaal (2009–2010) ==
Niet Normaal INT was launched in 2010 with the exhibition Niet Normaal, Difference on Display in Beurs van Berlage, Amsterdam, The Netherlands. The show exhibited works by over 80 artists, including Donald Rodney, Marlene Dumas, Marc Quinn and Viktor & Rolf a.o. The exhibition was opened by then princess Queen Maxima of the Netherlands on 15 December 2009, the exhibition and ran for three months.

The show aimed at uncovering normalization strategies in Western society. It advocated an inclusive, pluralistic society and offered the floor to a large diversity of artists. The liberating character of the show was praised by various critics from The Netherlands and abroad.

Niet Normaal, Difference on Display travelled to Berlin and Liverpool in 2012. It was part of the Olympic Games Cultural Program in the summer of 2012.

=== Controversy ===
The communication campaign for Niet Normaal, by ad agency KesselsKramer, included a poster that was banned by the Dutch Railways. The image on the poster was the sculpture Stuart Penn by British artist Marc Quinn. The sculpture is a cast of British stuntman Penn, who is missing his left arm and right leg. The Dutch Railways deemed the poster offensive, and refused to hang it in the stations for fear that travellers would complain.

== Exhibition Yes, Naturally (2013) ==
The second art exhibition organized by Niet Normaal INT was titled Ja, Natuurlijk (‘Yes, Naturally’). Opened on March 15th, 2013 on the premises of Gemeentemuseum The Hague, the Netherlands, the exhibition again featured over 80 artists, and lasted for six months. Participating artists included Olafur Eliasson, Peter Fend, Fischli & Weiss, Natalie Jeremijenko, Marjetica Potrc, Tinkebell and Ai Weiwei.

A major theme of 'Yes, Naturally' was Earth's preservation. The exhibition envisioned how innovations can cooperate with humans and nature to save Earth in the context of the climate crisis. The show presented partnerships between humans, nature, and technology. Visitors could design their own pet, open a bee savings account, create new coral reefs, and taste ant eggs and grilled seagulls.

== Exhibition Hacking Habitat (2016) ==
The following exhibition was Hacking Habitat, Art of Control, which ran from February 26th through June 5th, 2016. The exhibition's name references the concept of life hacking. The exhibition was set up in the former Wolvenplein prison in Utrecht, The Netherlands, which functioned as a prison until 2014, and now serves as an open create space. The show gave an artistic interpretation of how humans are controlled by high-tech systems, and how they may restore their relationship with machines.

Dutch artist Melanie Bonajo made a video for the exhibition titled Progress vs Regress. It depicted elderly people taking a selfie for the first time in their lives. Spanish artist Fernando Sánchez Castillo bought the last thing left of Franco's dictatorship: his pleasure yacht, Azor. He pressed the ship into 40 pieces of scrap: Guernica Syndrome (2014).

In the former prison's gymnasium ran William Kentridge's The Refusal of Time, a 5-channel video installation with kinetic sculpture exploring time in its various manifestations, through various media, including dance, film, music and spoken word.

== Exhibition Robot Love (2018) ==
Robot Love took place during Dutch Design Week 2018, in the former Campina milk factory in Eindhoven, The Netherlands from September until December 2018.

The show explored the relationship between humans and robots through a series of interactive art, design and engineering installations. The starting point of the exhibition was the question: what if humans approach robotization from the perspective of love and empathy?

Works included Annelies, Looking For Completion – a crying, human-like robot by art duo L.A. Raeven, an AI-robot in the form of a pink kitten that narrated a possible future history of the world created by Pinar Yoldas; and HellYeahWeFuckDie by artist Hito Steyerl – after the most popular words in American pop songs – with video footage of high-tech companies testing out robots that fall and stumble.

== Exhibition (Im)possible Bodies (2020) ==
(Im)possible Bodies is an interactive digital festival about cyborgs, data and artificial intelligence. The programme revolved around the idea that people have long been cyborgs. For centuries, humans have used prosthetics and technology to expand the capabilities of their bodies. (Im)possible Bodies offered a virtual experience through augmented realities with (ro)bots, 3D artworks, panel discussions, performances, and live musical shows. Virtual artworks include an AR dance performance by self-proclaimed cyborg Redo Ait Chitt, gut microbes inspired facial prostheses by Valerie Daude and collages of monstrous female bodies by photographer Viviane Sassen. Musician and cyborg Neil Harbisson developed a technique that allowed visitors to hear colors, starting to sing when users composed in the virtual space.

In addition to the presentation on screen, physical installations were presented in public space in ‘s-Hertogenbosch, The Netherlands from October until November 1st 2020, as part of Den Bosch Data Week. The online experience is still available today with the voice of Dutch comedian Vincent Bijlo guiding visitors through the online exhibition.

== Exhibition Fake Me Hard (2021) ==
As part of Rotterdam Art Week, Fake Me Hard was situated in the former harbor warehouse AVL Mundo, by Atelier van Lieshout. Works of over 40 artists confronted viewers with meditations on algorithms, (dis)information, artificial intelligence, technology, deep fakes, and populism. Curated by Ine Gevers and Kees de Groot, Fake Me Hard framed artificial intelligence and adjacent technologies as ideologically motivated and capable of manipulating every aspect of contemporary life, ranging from which products humans buy to the outcomes of elections.

For the exhibition, artist Rob Voerman created an enormous illuminated tower, The Republic, on which the face of Bill Gates and other main characters from conspiracy theories grinned at visitors. The works of Beeple (whose digital artworks as NFT's are sold for 69 million dollars) were shown on television screens that swung across the floor. In one of his animations, Facebook boss Mark Zuckerberg crawls on the ground like a hungry robot spider.

== Exhibition Come Alive (2022) ==
Come Alive was a large-scale exhibition that framed eroticism as a life force. Situated in the previous Royal Dutch Mint in Utrecht, The Netherlands, the exhibition was part of the program to celebrate the city’s 900th anniversary.

The exhibition was curated by Ine Gevers and Morgan Catalina. Gevers explained Come Alive as an experiential exhibition; “A kind of immersive theater where your body is turned on first and then your mind." Through smell, vibrations, film and more, the exhibition aimed to touch all senses.

The exhibition invited visitors to "learn and unlearn, to free their bodies, crack open their preconceived ideas, and unleash the power of eroticism". Come Alive presented works by 45 artists a.o. AES+F, Melanie Bonajo, Ernesto Neto, Sophie Calle, and Bas Kosters.

== Niet Normaal Institute for Inclusive Innovation ==
Niet Normaal Institute for Inclusive Innovation (NNIII) was founded in 2022 by Ine Gevers. NNIII was officially launched at the cultural festival Rondje Singel in Utrecht, The Netherlands.

Its mission is ‘to help organizations and individuals find their competitive edge in a changing world that demands inclusive practices’. NNIII offers workshops, concept coaching and keynotes at events such as SXSW and the European Congress Qualitative Inquiry.
