= Savoy Vaults =

Area of graves in London, England

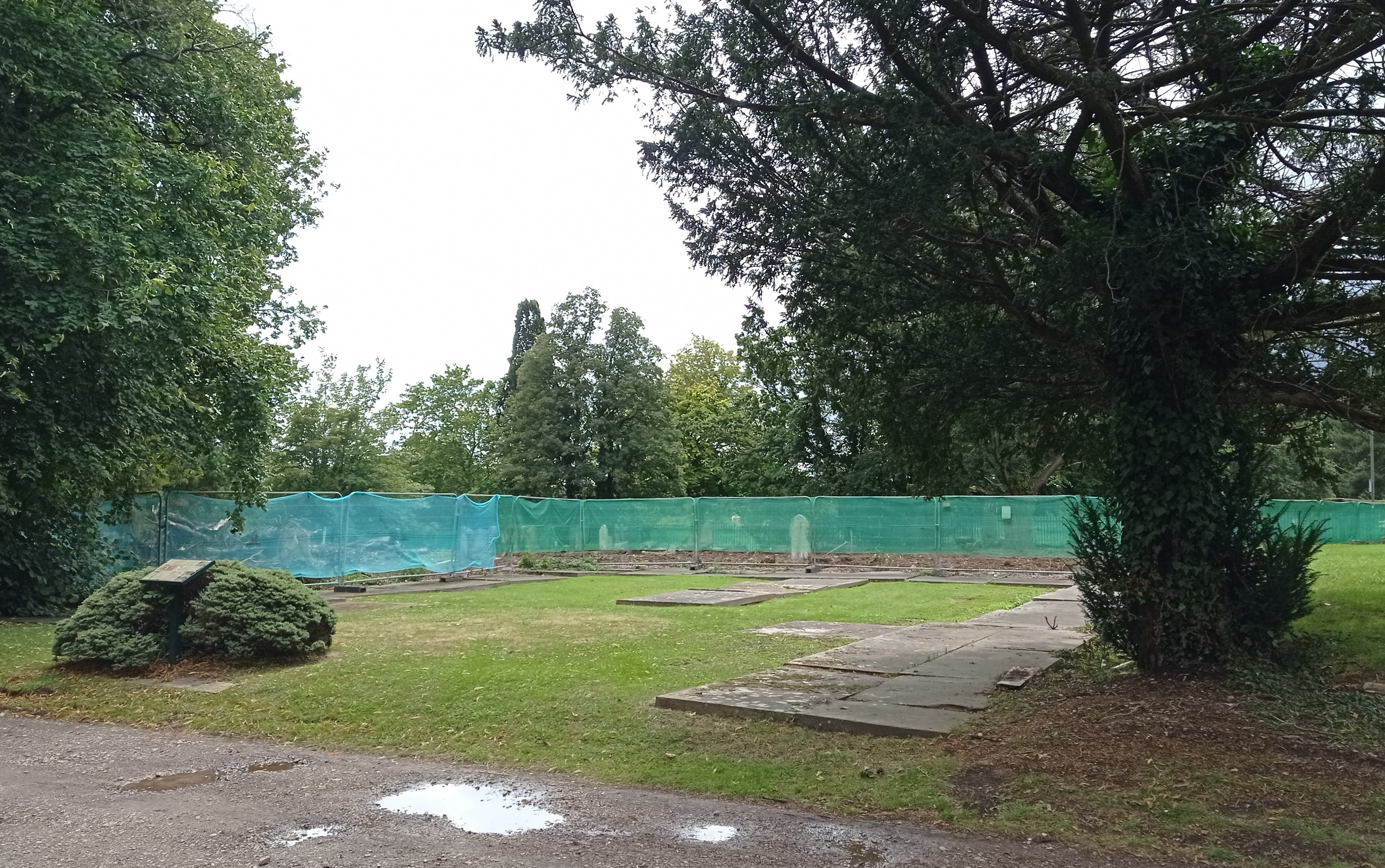
Savoy Vaults in 2023

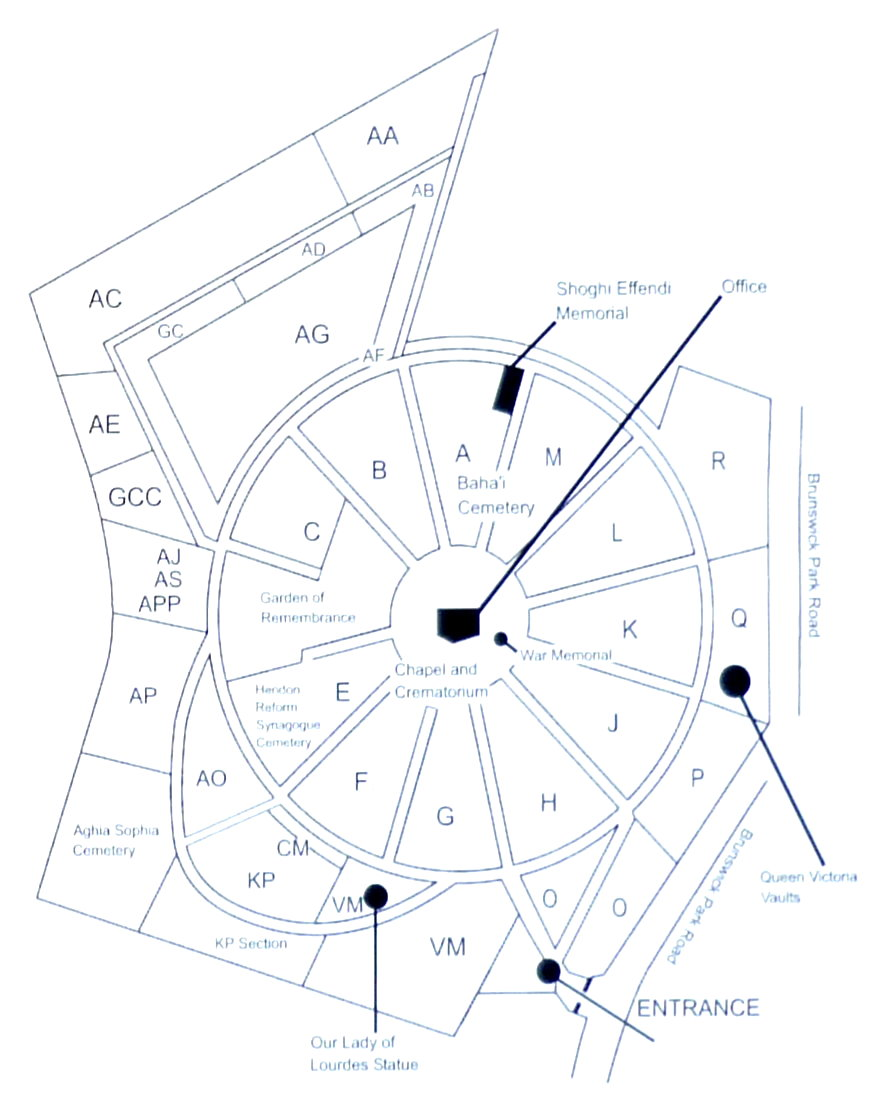
Location of the vaults (right) within the cemetery

The Savoy Vaults, or Queen Victoria Vaults, is an area of graves at New Southgate Cemetery in north London. The vaults contain the remains of those buried at the St Marienkirche Lutheran Chapel in Savoy Precinct, which was demolished in 1875 to improve access to the newly created Victoria Embankment on the northern edge of the River Thames. The chapel and many of the burials had links to the Hanoverians in England.

== St Marienkirche Lutheran Chapel ==
The St Marienkirche (St Mary's) Lutheran Chapel stood in the Savoy Precinct, along with the Savoy Chapel, in Savoy Street, south of Strand. It was founded in 1694 with the approval of the protestant William III, after a group of members of the Holy Trinity Lutheran Church split from those in the City of London and were allowed to establish a separate chapel in the City of Westminster. A burial ground was consecrated in 1721. The original chapel was replaced with a larger one in 1768. A total of 235 burials took place at the chapel between 1722 and 1853.

It was also known as the German Church of St Mary-le-Savoy because of its strong links to the Hanoverian court. The Hanoverian kings George I to III all granted the chapel royal warrants, which were renewed by Queen Victoria, and many Hanoverian courtiers worshipped either at the Savoy Chapel or the Marienkirche and were buried in its graveyard.

== Savoy Vaults ==
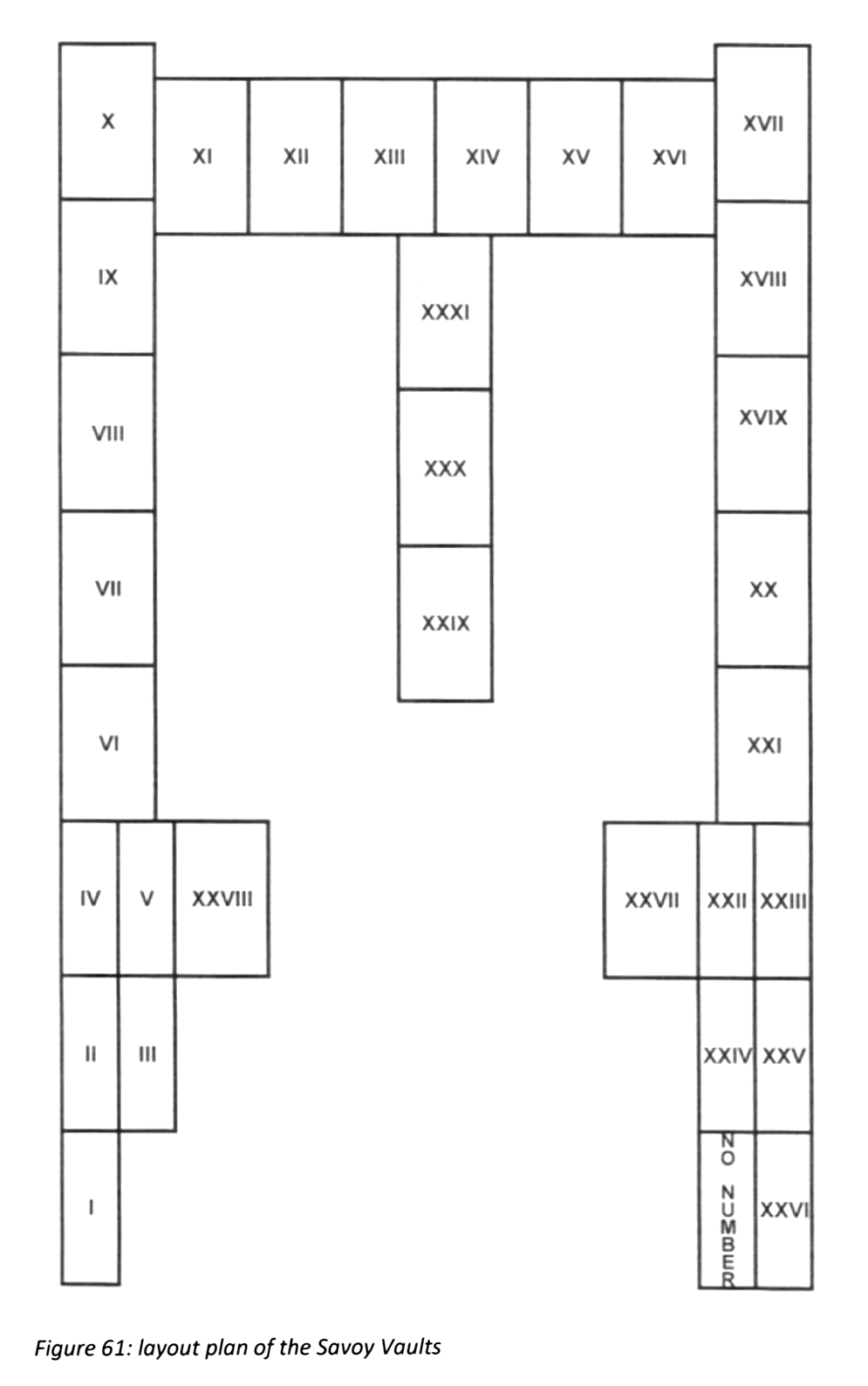
Savoy Vaults plan

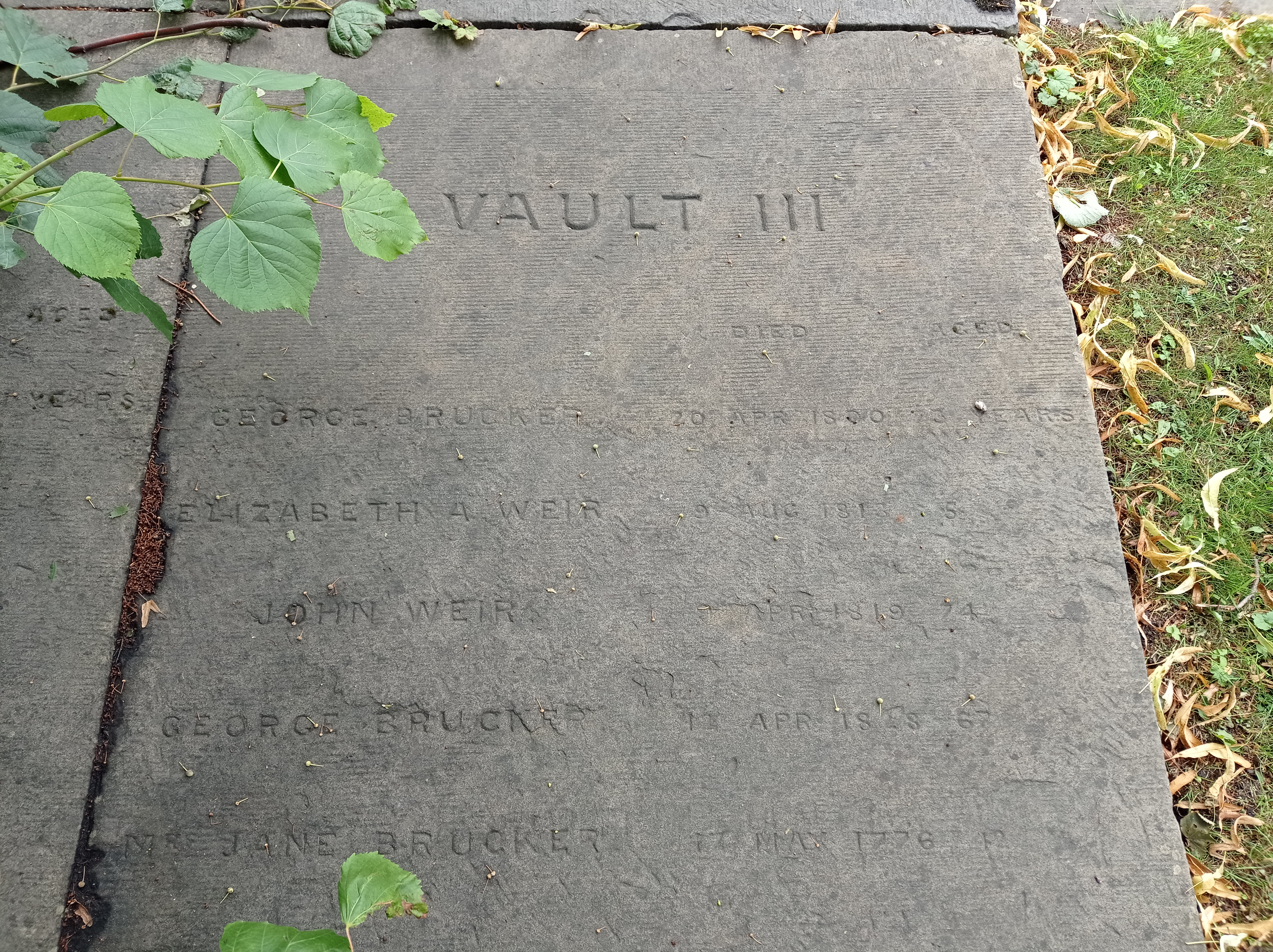
Vault III for members of the Brucker and Weir families

The Savoy Precinct was demolished in 1875 when a new approach was created from Strand to the recently created Victoria Embankment. In December 1875, an agreement was entered into between the Great North London Cemetery Company and the Duchy of Lancaster, on behalf of Queen Victoria, whereby the Queen was granted an exclusive right of burial in an area of consecrated ground at New Southgate Cemetery measuring 75 feet by 54 feet.

The plot contains 32 vaults, all with flat stone roofs, with family members being interred together. Each is numbered in Roman numerals with one un-numbered vault. The dates of death range from 1722 to 1854 and include 236 individuals of whom 11 were aged under one year and 26 under five. Among them are:

- Vault I - Charles H. de Hinuber, secretary to the Elector of Hanover, died 1792.
- Vault I - John R. Pittius, pastor of the German Lutheran Church in London, died 1761.
- Vault IX - Augustus F. C. Kollmann, composer and organist to the Royal German Chapel 46 years, died 1829.
- Vault XIII - Frederic M. Ziegenhagen, pastor, died 1776.
- Vault XXVI - Baron George Best FRS, H.M. Secretary for the Hanoverian Department, died 1823.

The vaults are laid out in a rough "M" shape which it has been speculated may stand for Marienkirche or Mary.

== Modern rediscovery ==
Supplemental to the original agreement, Queen Victoria paid an additional £250 (equivalent to £29,700 in 2023) to have the graves maintained in perpetuity. Despite this, by 1993 the area was greatly overgrown and when a member of the Anglo-German Family History Society attempted to locate the site, she was told that there was nothing to see. The vaults were eventually uncovered, and the inscriptions recorded, by two members of that society. Around 2002, the Friern Barnet & District Local History Society also began to take an interest in the vaults and conducted their own research, including contacting the royal archives at Windsor who suggested the society contact the Anglo-German Family History Society. In 2006, an information board was installed at the vaults by members of both societies.

== See also ==
- Lutheranism
- Savoy Place
