= Rob Voerman =

Dutch graphic artist

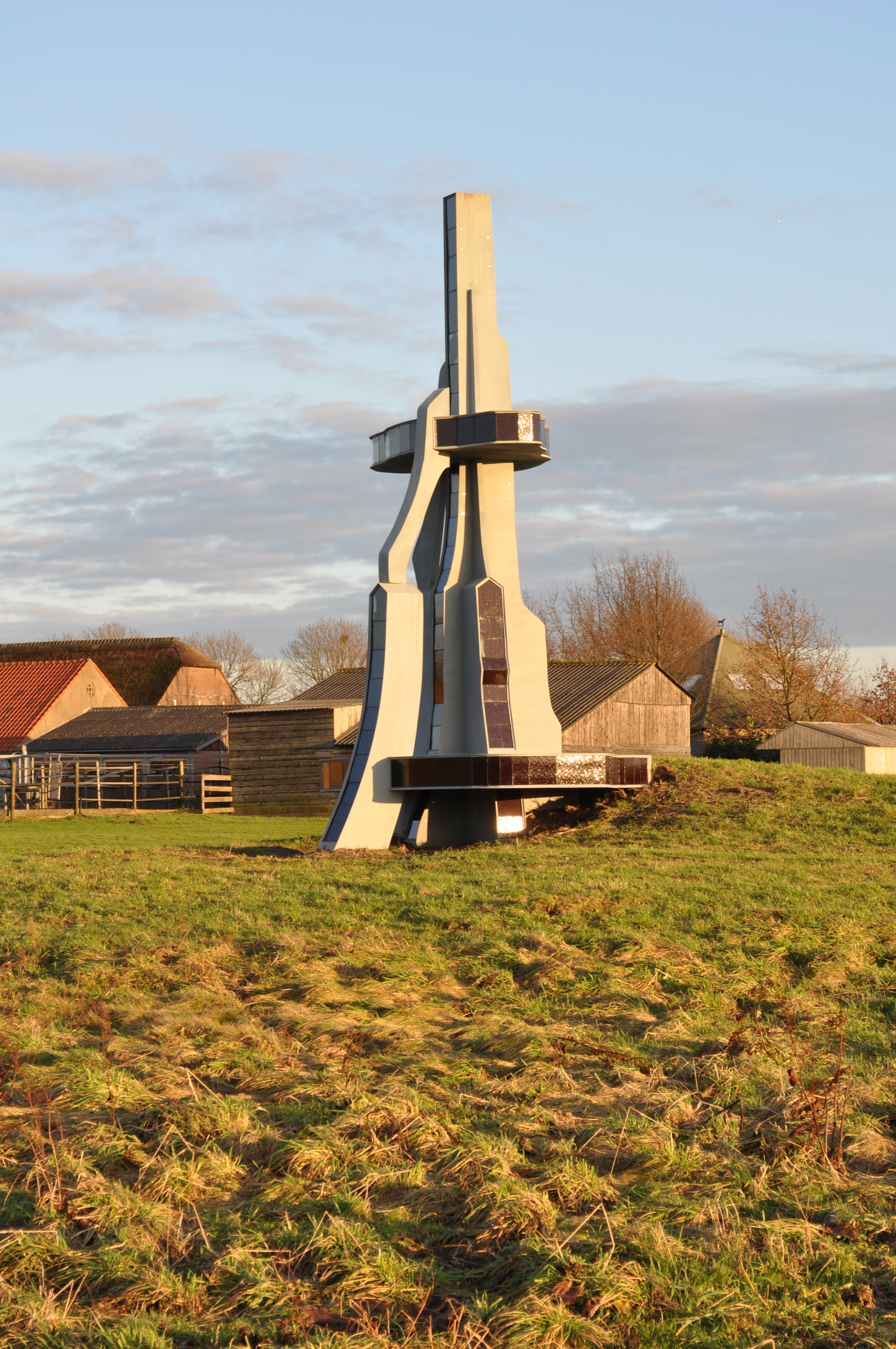
Sculpture at Leidsche Rijn, 2010.

Rob Voerman (born May 6, 1966, Deventer) is a Dutch graphic artist, sculptor and installation artist. His works generally show futuristic architectural constructions in a post-apocalyptic world full of destruction, explosions and the remains of conflict and catastrophe.

== Biography ==
Voerman studied at the CABK in Kampen which is now ArtEZ Art & Design in Zwolle (1990–1996). In 2001 Voerman applied to join Worldviews, an art in residence programme in New York City. The programme used studios at the top of one of the World Trade Center towers-studios with a spectacular of the city. The programme though never started because of the attacks of September 11, 2001. In the following year Voerman made the work Worldviews which referred to 9/11 and the idea of this residency that never happened.

== Work ==
Architecture, instability and deconstruction are central themes in the two-dimensional work and sculptures of Rob Voerman. His works are defined by a dialogue between the forms of old archaic appearances of the farmers-life and the modern technically developed society. The improvised constructions of his works reminds one of the anonymous architecture of sheds as can be seen on small farms and in gardens. Modern architecture was partially transformed and integrated by this archaic way of building. In his own words Voerman tries "to create the architecture of fictive communities living in remote areas or occupying existing citylandscapes. The communities will consist of a mixture of utopia, destruction and beauty."

Voermans three-dimensional works are made of many different materials such as cardboard, glass, plexiglass, and wood. The sculptures recall the memory of a primitive hut but at the same time the technological achievements of the machine age. In Voermans sculptures different typologies of architecture, furniture and machines blend together. An example is Moonshine (2006), which is a table but at the same time a maquette of a ruined flatbuilding. The work also functions as a bar and a smoking area. A bar full of alcoholic drinks is built into the table and there is an ashtray mounted in it too.

== Exhibitions ==
There have been exhibitions of Voermans work in Amsterdam, London, New York, Los Angeles, Berlin, Bregenz and Newcastle upon Tyne. His work has been presented in several groupshows in Belgium, Germany, the United States, Great Britain, Denmark, Taiwan, Canada and the Netherlands. In 2010 Voermans sculptures and drawings were presented in a major survey exhibition at the Cobra Museum in Amstelveen.

Recent exhibitions, projects and fairs:

- Fake Me Hard (Niet Normaal INT) at AVL Mundo in Rotterdam, NL (2021)
- Kaleidoscope at C24 Gallery, New York City, United States (2012)
- Coda Museum, Apeldoorn, NL (2012)
- Armory Show, New York City (2012)
- Art Rotterdam, NL (2012)
- University Art Museum, Santa Barbara, USA (2012)
- Commission for the entrance-hal for a new office of Achmea (insurance-company based in The Netherlands) (2012)
- Commission for entrance-hal Ministry of Agriculture, NL(2012)
- After the Goldrush at Upstream Gallery, Amsterdam, NL (2011)
- What if.. Rondeel Architectural Institute, Deventer, NL (2011)

== Collections (selection) ==
Rob Voerman's work is displayed in numerous public collections, including the:

- Museum of Modern Art, New York City
- Generali Foundation, Vienna
- KKR Office Collection, New York City
- Speyer Family Collection, New York City
- Stedelijk Museum, Amsterdam
- UCLA Hammer Museum, Los Angeles
- Coda Museum, Apeldoorn
- Valkhof Museum, Nijmegen
- Dutch state-owned bank ABN AMRO
- Deutsche Bank, Germany
- Dutch consultancy and engineering company Arcadis
