= Thomas Stirling Lee =

English sculptor (1857–1916)

- Born: 16 March 1857; Lambeth, London, England
- Died: 29 June 1916 (aged 59); St George's Hospital, Knightsbridge, London, England
- Education: Westminster School; Royal Academy Schools; École des Beaux-Arts
- Known for: Sculpture
- Elected: National Portrait Society; Chelsea Arts Club; International Society of Sculptors, Painters and Gravers

Thomas Stirling Lee (London, 16 March 1857 – 29 June 1916, London) was an English sculptor, specialising in reliefs and portrait heads.

== Early life ==
Lee was born in Lambeth, London on 16 March 1857, the son of John Swanwick Lee, a surveyor. He was educated at Westminster School and then served as an apprentice in the studio of John Birnie Philip.

Lee studied at the Royal Academy Schools from 1876 to 1880, where he won both a Gold Medal and a Travelling Scholarship. In 1880–1881 he studied under Pierre-Jules Cavelier at the École des Beaux-Arts in Paris, and then studied in Rome until 1883.

== Career ==
Stirling Lee's commission for 28 panels for the exterior of St George's Hall, Liverpool, resulting from an open competition held by Liverpool City Council in 1882, is regarded as his most important, but it was the subject of controversy, when the first two featured naked girls, depicting "the child Justice" and "the girl Justice". Lee only completed six of the 28 panels, but was subsequently commissioned to make two, and oversee all, of a further set of six on the theme of 'National Prosperity'.

Stirling Lee cast a number of bronze portrait reliefs (medallions) of friends and personalities. Examples are to be seen, e.g., in the Fitzwilliam Museum, Cambridge, the Victoria and Albert Museum, London, and in private collections.

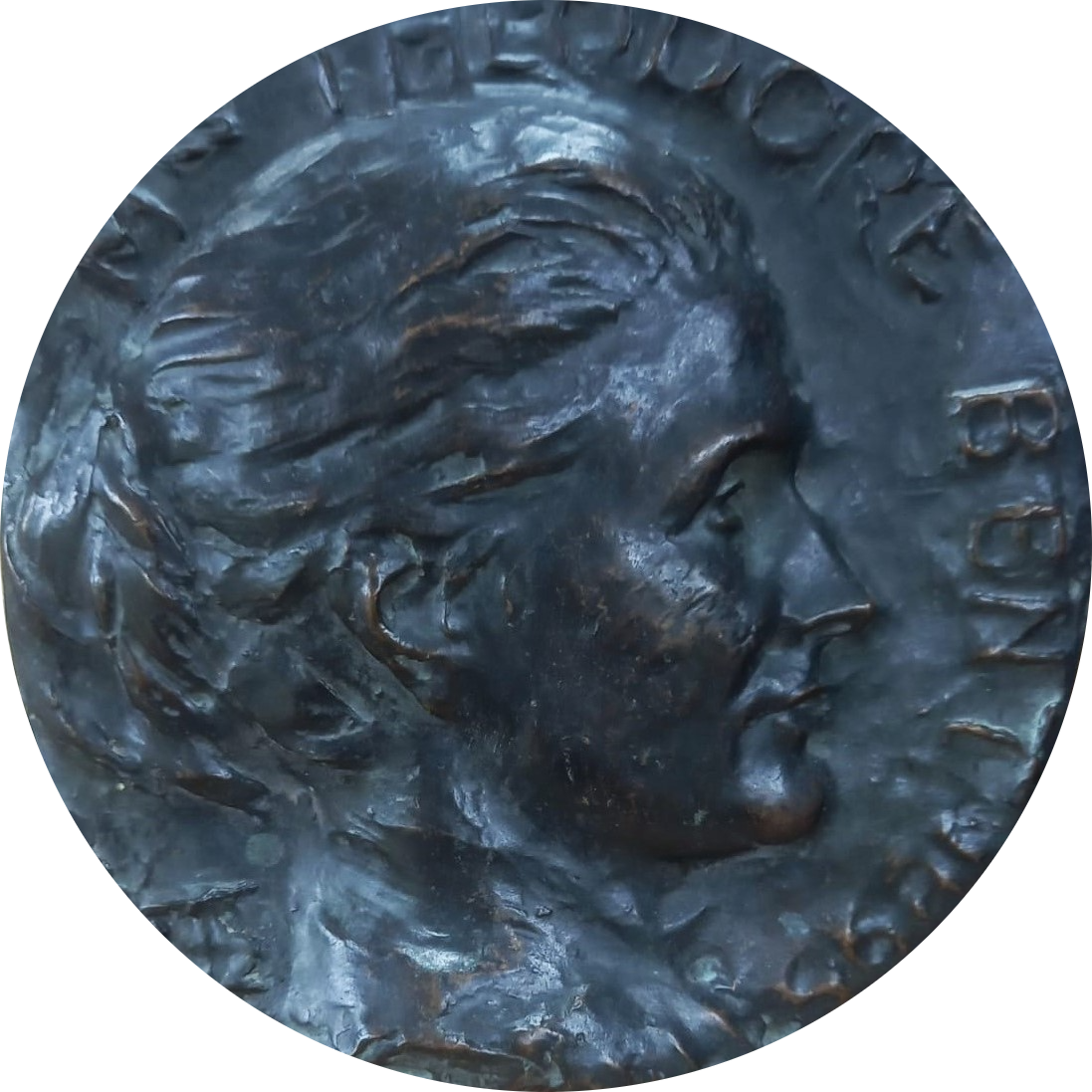
Mabel Bent, a bronze portrait relief (c. 25 cm, 2 kg) by Thomas Stirling Lee, dated 1895 (Bent Archive collection)

He was a member of the National Portrait Society from 1910 to 1915, building a studio in Chelsea, London. He was a member and twice chairman of the Chelsea Arts Club and a member of the International Society of Sculptors, Painters and Gravers. Stirling Lee was an active member of the Art Workers' Guild and was elected Master in 1898.

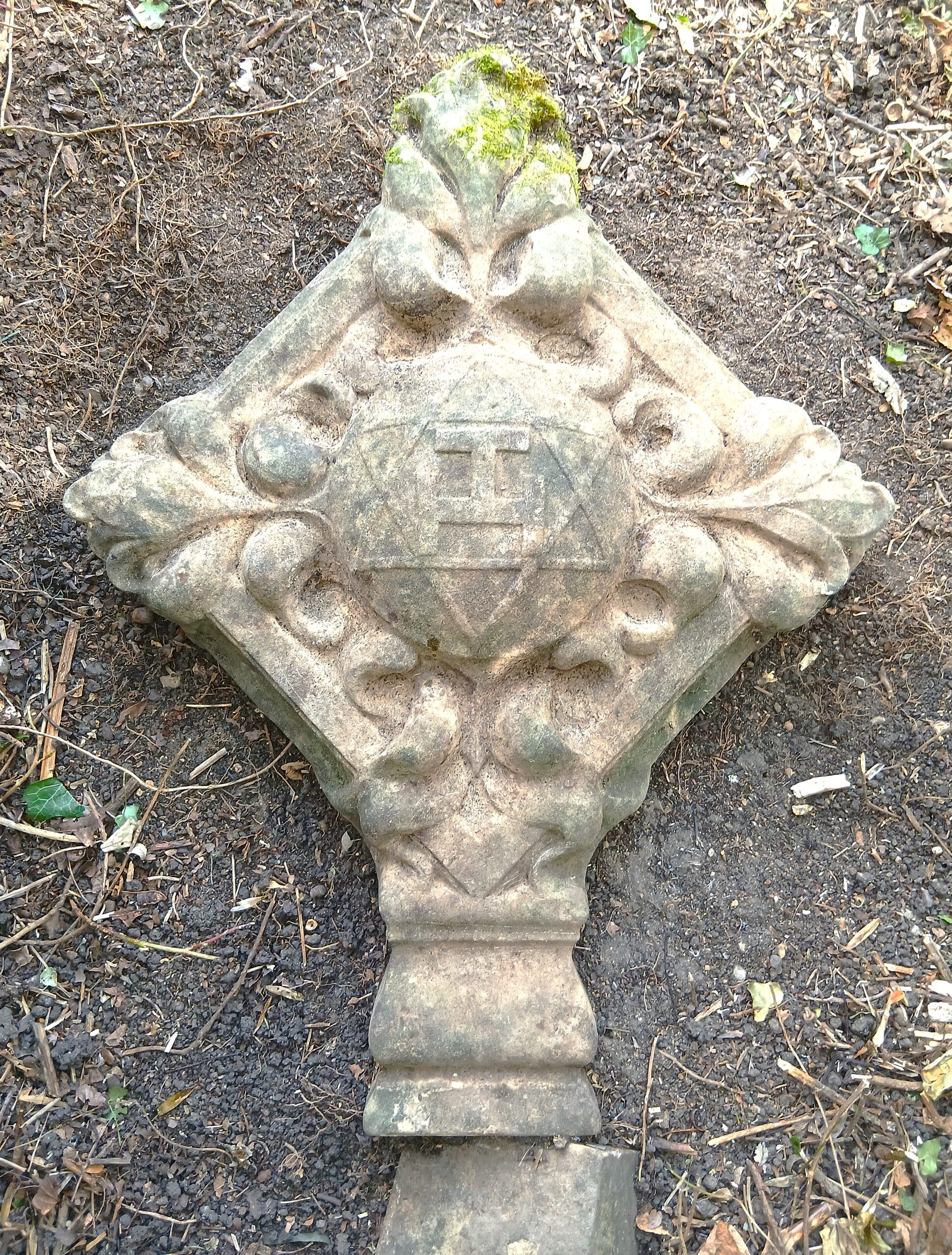
The reverse face of the stone cross from Thomas Stirling Lee’s 1911 monument to Henry Sadler in New Southgate Cemetery (Sector L), London, showing Lee’s carving of the ‘Triple Tau’ symbol (2026).

Lee was an active Freemason: “A new lodge, for the convenience of professors of the arts of sculpture and painting, was consecrated on Tuesday [13 June 1899], at Freemasons’ Hall, London… The lodge is numbered 2751 on the roll of Grand Lodge of England.” Lee was appointed one of the officers. He is credited with designing masonic jewels, i.e. for Public Schools Chapter No. 2233 and a Past Masters Jewel for Rosemary Lodge No. 2851. He also designed and carved the memorial for fellow mason Henry Sadler (d. 1911), in New Southgate Cemetery, London. It was commissioned by the Grand Lodge, for whom Sadler was archivist/librarian. The monument was in the form of a cross on a pillar resting on an inscribed base. The total height was c. 2.2 m in a rectangular plot. It has since collapsed and the cross piece is face down, awaiting restoration. What we see today on the reverse face is Lee's carving of the Triple Tau symbol, the grand emblem of Royal Arch Masonry.

== Death and burial ==
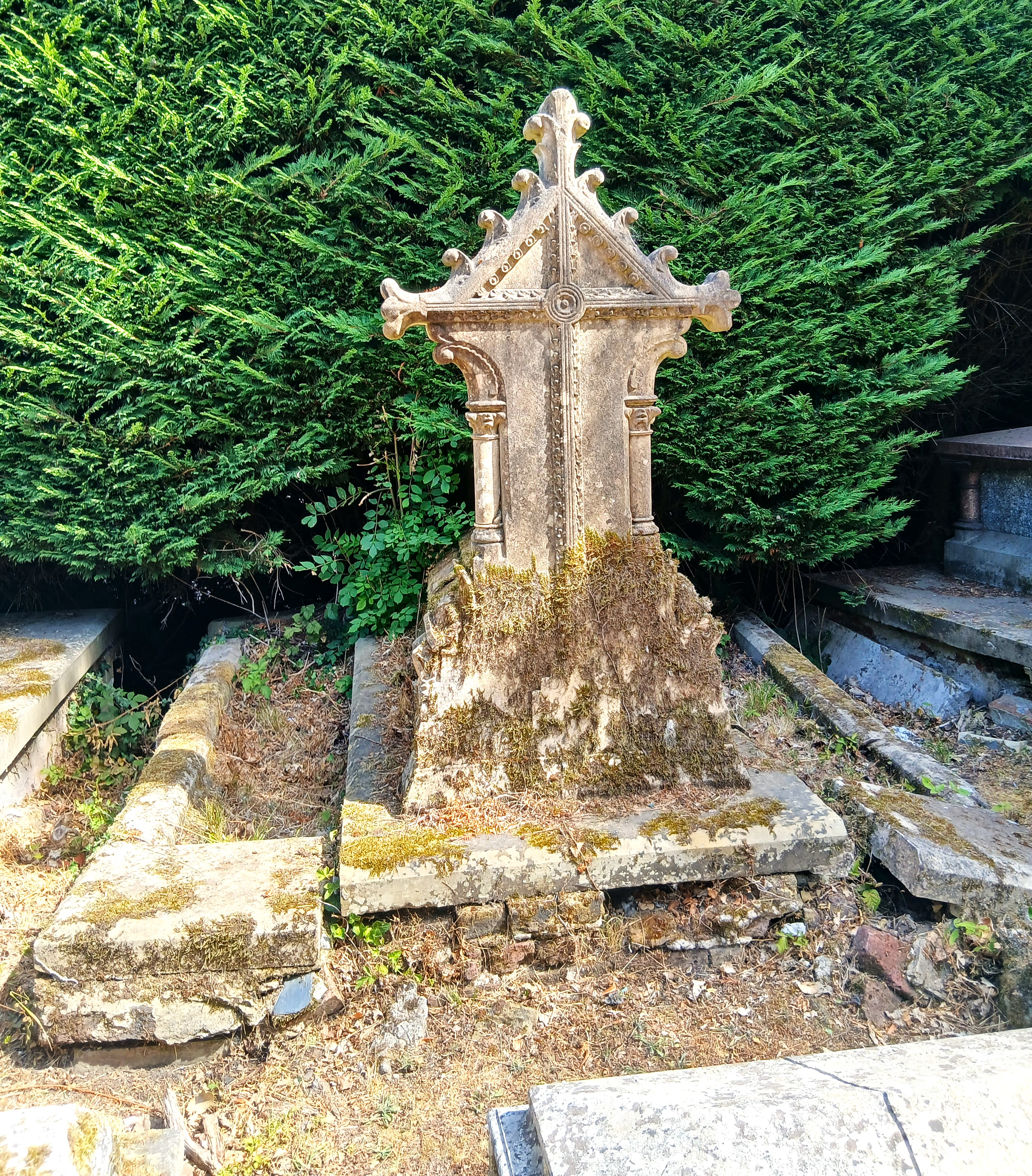
The family grave in the New Southgate Cemetery, Brunswick Park Rd, London, in which Thomas Stirling Lee was buried in July 1916.

Falling unconscious in the arcade at South Kensington Station, Stirling Lee died at St George's Hospital, Knightsbridge, London on 29 June 1916. He is buried in a family plot (99, Sector K; 51.62370290623633, -0.1447617412141977) in the New Southgate Cemetery, Brunswick Park Rd, London. The plot was granted to his father, John Swanwick Lee, in 1865, to hold six coffins, for which the latter paid seven guineas. Stirling Lee was buried there on Tuesday, 4 July 1916. The plot is somewhat dilapidated (August 2026) and the heads of two small figures on the sides of the headstone are missing; no inscriptions are visible apart from a few words. Apparently his friends subscribed to a fund for a bronze panel on the vault, but this has not been traced (August 2026).

== Works ==
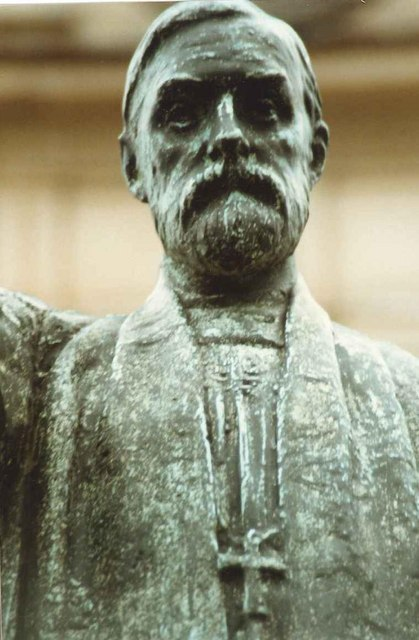
Statue of Charles Gore

Lee's work includes:

- Bas-reliefs for Leeds Town Hall
- Carvings for Westminster Cathedral
- Bronze statue of Charles Gore, First Bishop of Birmingham, outside Birmingham Cathedral (1914) - 52.48106°N 1.89821°W
- The Progress of Justice series of bas reliefs, left of the central portico on Saint George's Hall, Liverpool, 1885–1894
- The National Progress series, right of the portico on Saint George's Hall, 1898–1901
- Doors with scenes of male friendship, Adelphi Bank, Liverpool
