= Julie McNamara =

Julie McNamara (born 26 March 1960) is a theatre director, playwright, producer, actor and poet. She is artistic director of touring theatre company Vital Xposure. Patron of disability arts organisation DaDaFest and a political activist for human rights and gender politics.

== Early career ==
McNamara first performed as a backing singer in 1977 with punk band The Plague. That same year she was voted Actress of the Year in Merseyside Drama Festival.

She went on to work with Lowbrow Theatre, and the National Student Drama Festival at the Edinburgh Festival Fringe. She wrote and directed a trilogy: Venus and the Fly Trap, Cock and Bull Stories and Kill the Fatted Calf all produced in Nottingham 1981- 2. By 1987 she was working for socio-political company Banner Theatre touring the UK's Trade Union clubs, factory floors and picket lines.

== Theatre and disability ==
The majority of McNamara's work is created to ensure access for Deaf and disabled people is aesthetically integrated within the performance. However, she feels this has not always been successful and there is still scope for new developments. In a 2010 interview with Disability Arts Online she clarified: "We still didn't get it right for everybody. Some people don't read British Sign Language, their first language may be English and we had requests for 'Stage text' which frankly I hate. I don't know what the solution is. I still need to explore possibilities, but I am more and more convinced that the 'access' should never get in the way of the aesthetics of the craft."

== Theatre ==
Pig Tales, 2002. McNamara gained a commission through Ovalhouse and Jacksons Lane for the Xposure Festival of Disability Arts. She teamed up with Jessica Higgs, Director of In Tandem theatre company. Pig Tales is composed of five short vignettes based on the nursery rhyme 'This little piggy went to market'. Pig, the central character, is a female child raised as a boy. Pig's warring Liverpool Irish family are haunted by the rigid teachings of the Catholic church. Disappointed with their peers and dislocated from their roots, the family implodes. Pig reflects on the chaos and confusion of an adolescence set against the brutality of the Mental Health System. The production was chosen as 'Critics Choice' in The Times, touring both nationally and internationally.

Pig's Sister, also written and performed by McNamara and directed by Jessica Higgs, was created in association with Theatre Workshop Scotland, launched at The Poor School in London before transferring to Edinburgh Festival Fringe in 2005. Julie McNamara went on to direct the play herself, casting two men in the roles of Pig and Sissy. Pig was played by Adrian Wilkes and Sissy by Michael McNamara for DaDa Festival, Liverpool 2006.

Steak and Chelsea Out to Lunch, was first commissioned by No Strings Attached Theatre in partnership with Feast Festival Adelaide (2008)

Crossings (2008 -2010) was first commissioned by DaDa Festival in 2008. Originally directed by Karena Johnson, it was re-directed by Paulette Randall and toured extensively throughout UK, closing at the Grand Opera House, Belfast. The production was featured on Ulster television UTV, BBC Radio 4 and attracted a Writer's Award through DaDaFest and ITV. McNamara gained the South Bank Show Award for diversity (2010)

The Knitting Circle (2010 - 2013) Directed first by Antoinette Lester and then by Paulette Randall. It was written from authentic survivor testimony. The production painted a picture of the lives of women who lived in the old asylums of Britain's long care system. Set within a fictional institution in the 1980s called Harper Park, the patients face the worst aspects of Margaret Thatcher's 'Community Care' or care in the community scheme in the 1980s. The idea for the production was inspired by an old recording made 30 years ago, when McNamara was working as a nursing assistant in a long-stay hospital in the Hertfordshire. The cassette contained the voices of female patients she had lived and worked with, all telling their personal stories.

Whisper Me Happy Ever After (2014) Inclusive theatre company Face Front commissioned McNamara to write Whisper Me Happy Ever After. The play is written from the testimonies of children between 9 – 12 years who have lived with violence in the home. The play makes a strong call out for new ways of dealing with domestic violence and ways to reach young people affected. The story is developed through research with young people and parents who've survived domestic or gang violence, and with teachers, mental health experts, the police, domestic violence forums and support groups.

Let Me Stay (2013–2015) McNamara wrote Let Me Stay as a tribute to her mother Shirley, who lives with Alzheimer's. The play is the result of years of recordings and filming her mother's stories and songs. Shirley McNamara collaborated throughout the creative process. The message of this play is "it is possible to live well with Dementia". McNamara performed in this one woman show under the direction of Paulette Randall. Let Me Stay launched in October 2013 at Interacting Festival Corban Arts Centre, Auckland. Between 2014 and 2015 the play toured UK, Scotland, Northern Ireland and NE Brazil, closing on 20 June 2015 at Downpatrick, NI. The tour was supported with an award by Unlimited.

The Disappearance of Dorothy Lawrence written by McNamara and directed by Paulette Randall opened on 11 September 2015 at Arena Theatre, Wolverhampton. The play was based on the life of historical character Dorothy Lawrence. Her extraordinary story highlights the silencing of women's voices throughout history and the connection with the mental health system as a tool of censorship and repression. Paulette Randall directs the play which involves a cast of four and includes integrated subtitling, British Sign Language interpretation and Audio description.

In June 2015 Julie McNamara was commissioned to respond to the collections of medical museums as part of the project Exceptional and Extraordinary: unruly bodies and minds in the medical museum. Other artists commissioned were Francesca Martinez, David Hevey and Deaf Men Dancing. McNamara's piece was entitled Hold the Hearse!

== Film ==
McNamara was artistic director of London Disability Arts Forum from 1998, she worked with London Disability Arts Forum and Caglar Kimyoncu to create the Disability Film Festival at South Bank's National Film Theatre, now BFI. The festival closed in 2006 but the creative team returned to the National Film Theatre for a fresh collaboration as part of Liberty Festival in 2012.

After leaving London Disability Arts Forum in 2006, McNamara was awarded the DaDa Festival's Lifetime Achievement Award for services to Disability Arts.

Her film credits include playing the part of Sam in the feature film Stud Life (2012). The IMDb also lists her film contribution as performing herself in Vicky! (1992) and the Southbank Show (2009).

== Writer ==
McNamara writing work includes all of the plays afore mentioned. She also had poetry published in several anthologies by Survivors' Press, Bloodaxe Books, and Karnac Books. Her first collection, edited by Joe Bidder and Hilary Porter: Chaos Calls was published in 2012 by Vital Xposure.

== Singer ==
Recordings of McNamara's singing kept at the British Library: The lords and ladies of Little Egypt 1988 and "I was born in A MerseyTown"(first line) as part of the Traditional Music in England project, John Howson collection, 1992.

== UK Awards ==
Actress of the Year 1977, Merseyside Drama Festival (Liverpool) Theatre People Award 2003, Arts Council England (London) Emerging Artist Award 2004–2006, Arts Council England (London) Lifetime's Achievement Award 2006, Liverpool DaDa Festival DaDa festival writer award 2009 with ITV Productions The Southbank Show Diversity Award 2010 Unlimited Award 2014.
