= Karena Johnson =

British theatrical director and producer

Karena Johnson is a British theatrical director and producer who first started working at London's Oval House Theatre. She was acting artistic director at Contact theatre and Artistic Director of Kushite Theatre Company as well as associate director at Nottingham Playhouse and Theatre Royal Stratford East. She was born in South London, and studied drama at the Royal Holloway, University of London and at the University of Leicester.

She has programmed a succession of productions, including Dipo Agboluaje's Early Morning, a satire about Nigerian cleaners mounting a coup in the city of London. She has been involved in a number of international cultural collaborations within Iran, China, Nigeria, Turkey and Europe.

Karena has worked as a professional theatre director since 1997. Her work include "40" by Angie LeMar at Hackney Empire Crossings by Julie McNamara at Cochrane Theatre "Safe" by David Herminstien at West Yorkshire Playhouse"Sweet Yam Kisses" which was conceived by her and written by Courttia Newland and Pat Cumper at the Lyric Hammersmith,"The Bridge" by Pedro Obaseki, an international co-production between Oval House Theatre and Don Pedro productions Nigeria; "The Oddest Couple" by Geoff Aymer at the Theatre Royal Stratford East; "Vengeance" by Wayne Buchanan on a National Tour; "Yerma" by Federico Garcia Lorca at the Young Vic/ Jerwood Space; "The Key Game" by Pat Cumper at the Riverside Studios; "The Front Room" by Jenny Davis on a National Tour; "Under Their Influence" by Wayne Buchanan at the Tricycle Theatre; "Angie Baby" by Rommie Smith at the Young Vic; "Gods and Bad Guys" by Tunde Euba; "Two" by Jim Cartwright; and EMMA Award nominated premier production of Vengeance by Wayne Buchanan at the Oval House Theatre.

Karena has also collaborated with other artist as including Robert Hylton on "Swan Breaks" Benji Reid on "Process 06" and Melih Gorgun on "SEAS Black/North"

Karena was a Jerwood Young Director Award Winner in 2003 and was nominated for the Carlton Multicultural Awards in 2003. Karena was the head of theatre programming at Oval House Theatre for five years, was the artistic director of Kushite Theatre, the acting artistic director of Contact Theatre, Manchester and CEO and artistic director of The Broadway theatre in Barking. Karena spent some time working as a freelance director in London and has been artistic director and CEO of Hoxton Hall since February 2015.
