= Alexander Spurr =

British architect

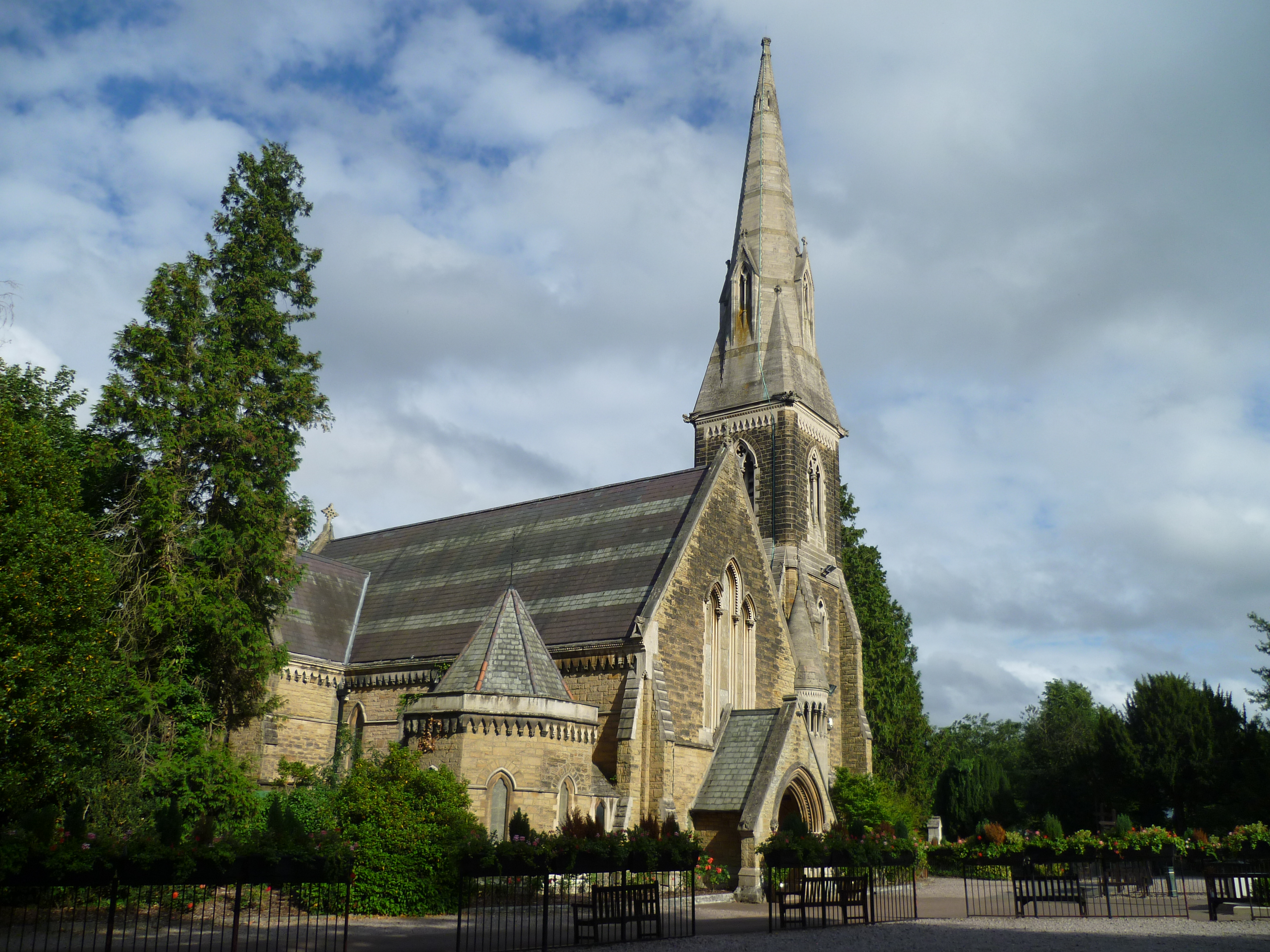
The chapel at New Southgate Cemetery designed by Spurr

Edmund Alexander Spurr (died 1873) was a British architect who designed and was the superintendent of the Great Northern Cemetery (now known as the New Southgate Cemetery) in London, England. He was a fellow of the Royal Institute of British Architects. Spurr is buried at New Southgate Cemetery.

Spurr designed the Great Northern on a spoke and wheel plan with an episcopal chapel at the centre. The chapel was in the early English lancet style with a broach spire of 150 feet.
