= Ine Gevers =

Dutch curator, writer and activist

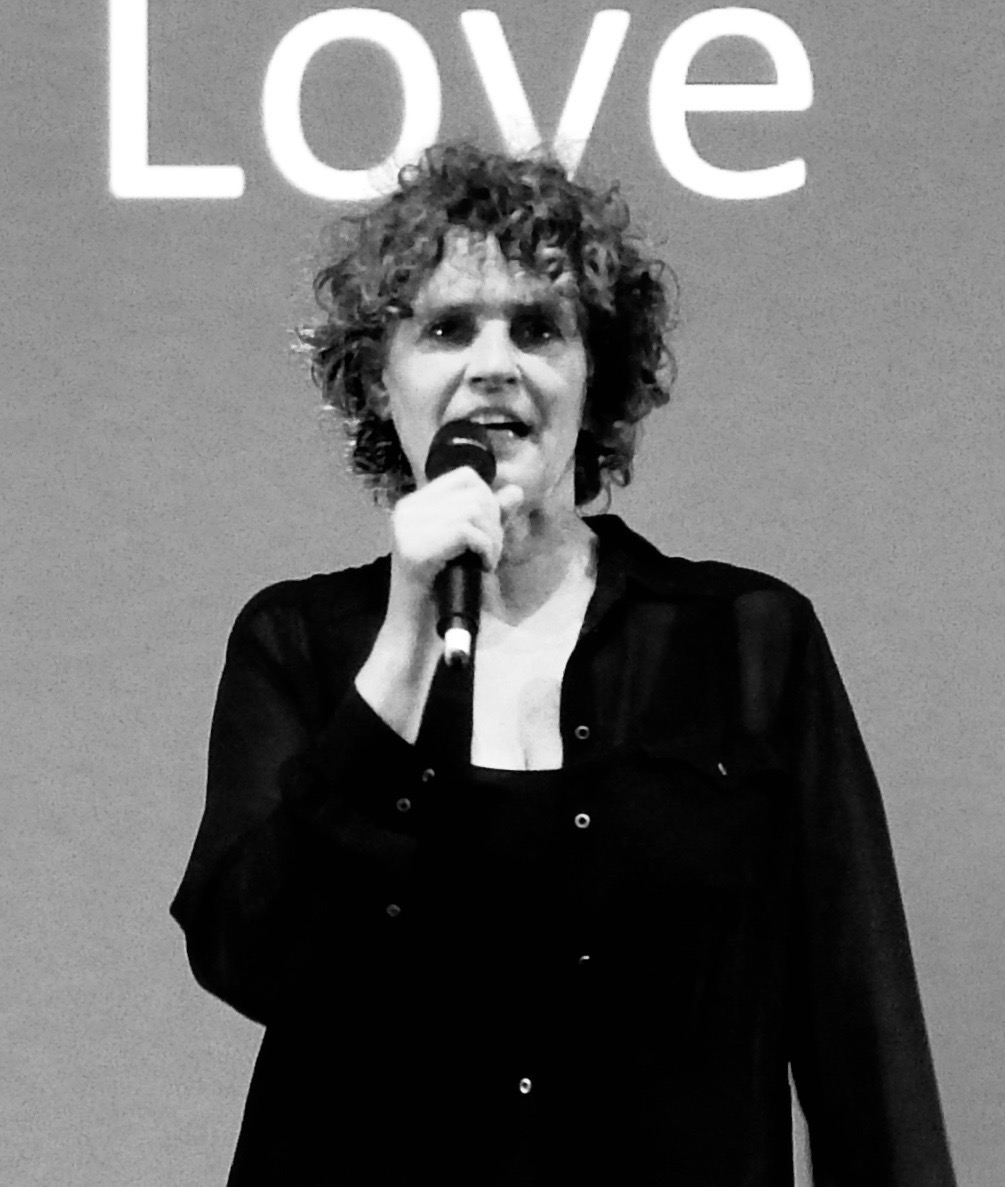
Ine Gevers giving talk at Dutch Design Week 2017

Ine Gevers (born 1960 in Valkenswaard) is a Dutch curator of contemporary art, writer and activist. Gevers is known for large themed exhibitions in which she (often with others) explores the relationships between technology, power and identity. She has been called one of The Netherlands' most radical curators.

== Education ==
Gevers studied art history and philosophy at Utrecht University and graduated with a study on Modernism in Europe, which resulted in the exhibition Janus de Winter, de schilder mysticus at the Centraal Museum and a publication of the same name. She worked as assistant-curator at the Van Abbemuseum Eindhoven and then went to Almere, directing the exhibition space the Aleph and preparing the grounds for the Museum De Paviljoens. From 1988 to 2000 she was head of Department Studium Generale at the Jan van Eyck Academie in Maastricht, where she curated several internationally acknowledged exhibitions and symposia such as Place Position Presentation Public in 1992.

== Work ==
In 1994 she curated the art exhibition I + The Other, Art and the Human Condition (Dutch: Ik + de ander), together with Hester Alberdingk Thijm and assistant curator Jeanne van Heeswijk. As founding director of the De Center, center of neuro diverse cultures, she organised Encountering the Culture of the Norm, a multi-visual seminar in collaboration with Martijn Dekker and Gunilla Gerland. With Stichting De Geuzen Amsterdam she realized with Temporary Sanity an alternative plea when considering madness and motive. For Stichting Interart she wrote the manifest Artists with Agenda’s and lectured on Diaspora Consciousness. In 2007 she became the founding Director of the Niet Normaal Int, which has organised several biennial-like art manifestations and exhibitions in the Netherlands, Germany and the UK . In 2016 she curated an exhibition called Hacking Habitat in a former jailhouse in Utrecht, featuring works by artists including William Kentridge, Andres Serrano, and Melanie Bonajo, whose message was that technology can function like a prison.

Gevers lectured on her work at VIVA and works as a tutor at the Gerrit Rietveld Academie, HISK Antwerpen, Dutch Design Academy Eindhoven, Dutch Art Institute Enschede, and HKU Utrecht. She is an art collection advisor and director of, among others, the Fentener van Vlissingen Fund. In 2020 she founded the Future of Work (FOW) foundation as a vehicle for crafting an inclusive and diverse future of work.

== Exhibitions ==
- 2022 COME ALIVE, experiential exhibition on eroticism as a life force, situated in the previous Royal Dutch Mint in Utrecht, The Netherlands
- 2021 FAKE ME HARD, large-scale art exhibition on algorithms, (dis)information, artificial intelligence, deep fakes, and populism situated at AVL Mundo in Rotterdam, The Netherlands
- 2020 (IM) POSSIBLE BODIES, hybrid festival about cyborgs, digital twins and data ethics in 's-Hertogenbosch, the Netherlands and online
- 2018 ROBOT LOVE, large-scale exhibition at the interface of design, art and technology. Visitor's magnet at Dutch Design Week 2018 in Eindhoven, The Netherlands
- 2016 HACKING HABITAT – Art of Control, artistic interpretation of how, as humans, we are controlled by high-tech systems, and how to restore our relationship with machines, located in the former Wolvenplein prison, in Utrecht, the Netherlands
- 2013 JA NATUURLIJK – How Art Saves the World, art exhibition on how innovations can cooperate with humans and nature to save our planet in the context of the climate crisislocated on the premises of Gemeentemuseum Den Haag, The Netherlands
- 2009: NIET NORMAAL – Difference on Display, large-scale art exhibition aimed at uncovering normalization strategies in Western society. It advocated an inclusive, pluralistic society and offered the floor to a large diversity of artists. The show was located in Beurs van Berlage, Amsterdam and opened by Queen Maxima of The Netherlands
- 1994 IK + DE ANDER – Art and the Human Condition, Beurs van Berlage, Amsterdam

== Publications ==
- 2018 ROBOT LOVE - Can we learn from robots about love?, with introduction, English ed., Full color, hard cover, 240 p., Terra Publishing ISBN 9789089897763
- 2016 Hacking Habitat • Art of Control – Art, Technology and Social Change, with introduction: Society needs to be Hacked. Niet Normaal/NAI010 Publishers
- 2013 Yes Naturally • How Art saves the World, with introduction: Can art save the World? NAI010 Publishers
- 2009 Difference on Display, Diversity in Art, Science and Society Niet Normaal, with introduction: Normality on Prescription, NAI010 Publishers
- 2005 Artworks that demand Consummation, in Documentary Now: Contemporary Strategies in Photography, Film and the Visual Arts
- 1997 Beyond Ethics and Aesthetics, with introduction: Curating: Stereotyping the Other or Risking One's Own Identity, SUN Publishers
- 1997 Strategies in Presentations, Jan van Eyck Academie Maastricht
- 1994 I + The Other, Art and the Human Condition, Stichting Artimo, Amsterdam
- 1993 Place, Position, Presentation, Public, Jan van Eyck Academie, Maastricht
- 1992 Cultural Identity: Fiction or Necessity, Jan van Eyck Academie, Maastricht

Ine Gever's essays have appeared in several Dutch and English publications.
