= John McGrath (artistic director) =

British artistic director

- Born: John Edward McGrath; 5 September 1962 (age 63); Mold, Wales, UK
- Education: New York University Graduate School of Arts and Science
- Occupations: Artistic Director and Chief Executive of the Manchester International Festival
- Notable work: The Passion (passion play), directed by and starring Michael Sheen
- Awards: 2005 Cultural Leadership Award, NESTA; 2015 Honorary Doctorate, Open University

Notes
- Thesis After privacy: surveillance culture and performative space. (1999) ISBN 9780599472839

John Edward McGrath (born 5 September 1962) is the British artistic director and chief executive of Aviva Studios, home of Factory International.

Manchester International Festival also operates out of this venue run by McGrath and his team based on the site of the old Granada Television Studios in Manchester, England.

== Early life ==
John Edward McGrath was born 5 September 1962 in Mold, North Wales and grew up in Liverpool.

== Education ==
McGrath gained his Ph.D. from the New York University Graduate School of Arts and Science in 1999.

== Career ==
As a development officer McGrath founded Arts Integrated Merseyside (AIM), a disability arts organisation based in Liverpool, which later became DaDaFest. He also worked as a theatre director in New York, including working as an associate director for Mabou Mines.

He then became the artistic director of the Contact Theatre in Manchester (1999-2008) and the founding artistic director at National Theatre Wales (NTW) (2009 - end of 2015). During his time at the NTW the actor Michael Sheen starred in and was creative director of The Passion, a 72-hour secular passion play staged in Sheen's hometown of Port Talbot, Wales with over 1,000 local residents taking part.

In 2013 McGrath was interviewed alongside a number of other theatre practitioners in Wales for the, It Gets Better Project. The project was set up in response to the suicides of teenagers who were bullied because they were gay or because their peers suspected that they were gay. In the video he states, "I knew that I didn't quite fit in with the right way to be a boy...If you can find ways to be strong and to ask for help when you need help, then people are out there to help you. ... Don't worry also if you don't fit into the new 'profit pattern' of what it is to be gay, there are places and spaces to be a bit different, even from that."

In 2015, McGrath was appointed the artistic director and chief executive of Manchester International Festival.

In September 2022, the whole organisation re-branded as Factory International, though it will continue to present MIF every two years.

In 2023, it was announced that the building would be called Aviva Studios after insurance company Aviva secured the naming rights for £35 million, making McGrath at the head of one of the UK's biggest cultural corporate sponsorship deals.

== Awards ==
- 2005 Cultural Leadership Award from the National Endowment for Science Technology and the Arts (NESTA)
- 2015 Honorary Doctorate from the Open University

== Books ==
- McGrath, John E. (1999). After privacy: surveillance culture and performative space (Ph.D.). OCLC 476972941. ISBN 9780599472839 ProQuest.
- McGrath, John E. (2004). Loving big brother: performance, privacy and surveillance space. London New York: Routledge. ISBN 9780415275385.
