= Parks and open spaces in the London Borough of Barnet =

Coordinates: 51.6254°N 0.1527°W

The London Borough of Barnet, located on the northern periphery of London and having much of the area within its boundaries in the Metropolitan Green Belt, has many parks and open spaces. In addition there are large areas taken over by cemeteries and golf courses, and part of Hampstead Heath.

== Parks ==
=== Premier Parks ===
Barnet describes its 16 main open spaces as 'premier parks', 7 of which achieved a Green Flag Award for 2009/10:

- Childs Hill Park and Basing Hill Park, Childs Hill
- Cherry Tree Wood, East Finchley
- Edgwarebury Park, Edgware
- Friary Park, Friern Barnet
- Hendon Park, Hendon
- Lyttelton Playing Fields, Hampstead Garden Suburb
- Mill Hill Park, Mill Hill
- Oak Hill Park, East Barnet
- Old Court House Recreation Ground, High Barnet
- Sunny Hill Park, Hendon
- Swan Lane Open Space, Whetstone
- Tudor Sports Ground, New Barnet
- Victoria Park, Finchley Central
- Victoria Recreation Ground, New Barnet
- Watling Park, Burnt Oak
- West Hendon Playing Fields, West Hendon

=== Other parks and green spaces ===
The borough contains over 200 green spaces. Some of them are:

- Bethune Park, Friern Barnet
- Bittacy Hill Park, Mill Hill
- Brent Park, Hendon
- Highlands Gardens, New Barnet
- Long Lane Pasture, Finchley
- Whitings Hill Open Space, Chipping Barnet

== Nature reserves ==
=== Site of Special Scientific Interest ===
- Brent Reservoir (a Site of Special Scientific Interest which is partly in the London Borough of Brent)

=== Local Nature Reserves ===
Barent has 7 Local Nature Reserves

- Big Wood and Little Wood, Hampstead Garden Suburb
- Oak Hill Wood, East Barnet
- Scratchwood and Moat Mount open space, Mill Hill
- Coppetts Wood and Glebelands, Colney Hatch
- Rowley Green Common, Arkley
- Totteridge Fields, Totteridge
- Brent Reservoir is a Local Nature Reserve as well as a Site of Special Scientific Interest

=== Sites of Nature Conservation Interest ===
The Borough has 67 Sites of Importance for Nature Conservation, and these are listed in Nature reserves in Barnet. Some of them are:

- Hampstead Heath (only the Hampstead Heath Extension and Golders Hill Park are in Barnet)
- Arrandene Open Space and Featherstone Hill, Mill Hill
- Darland's Lake Nature Reserve, Totteridge
- Golders Hill Park, Golders Green
- King George's Fields, Monken Hadley
- The Mill Field, Mill Hill
- Monken Hadley Common, Monken Hadley
- Stoneyfields Park, Edgware

== Dollis Valley Greenwalk ==
The Dollis Valley Greenwalk in Barnet was one of 11 green spaces throughout Greater London chosen to receive money for redevelopment by a public vote in 2009; the walk received £400,000 towards a variety of improvements, including better footpaths and more lighting. The walk follows Dollis Brook, which is also Site of Importance for Nature Conservation.

== See also ==
- Nature reserves in Barnet
- East Finchley Cemetery
- St. Pancras and Islington Cemetery
