= Bethune Park =

Park in Friern Barnet, London, England

Coordinates: 51.6196°N 0.15236°W

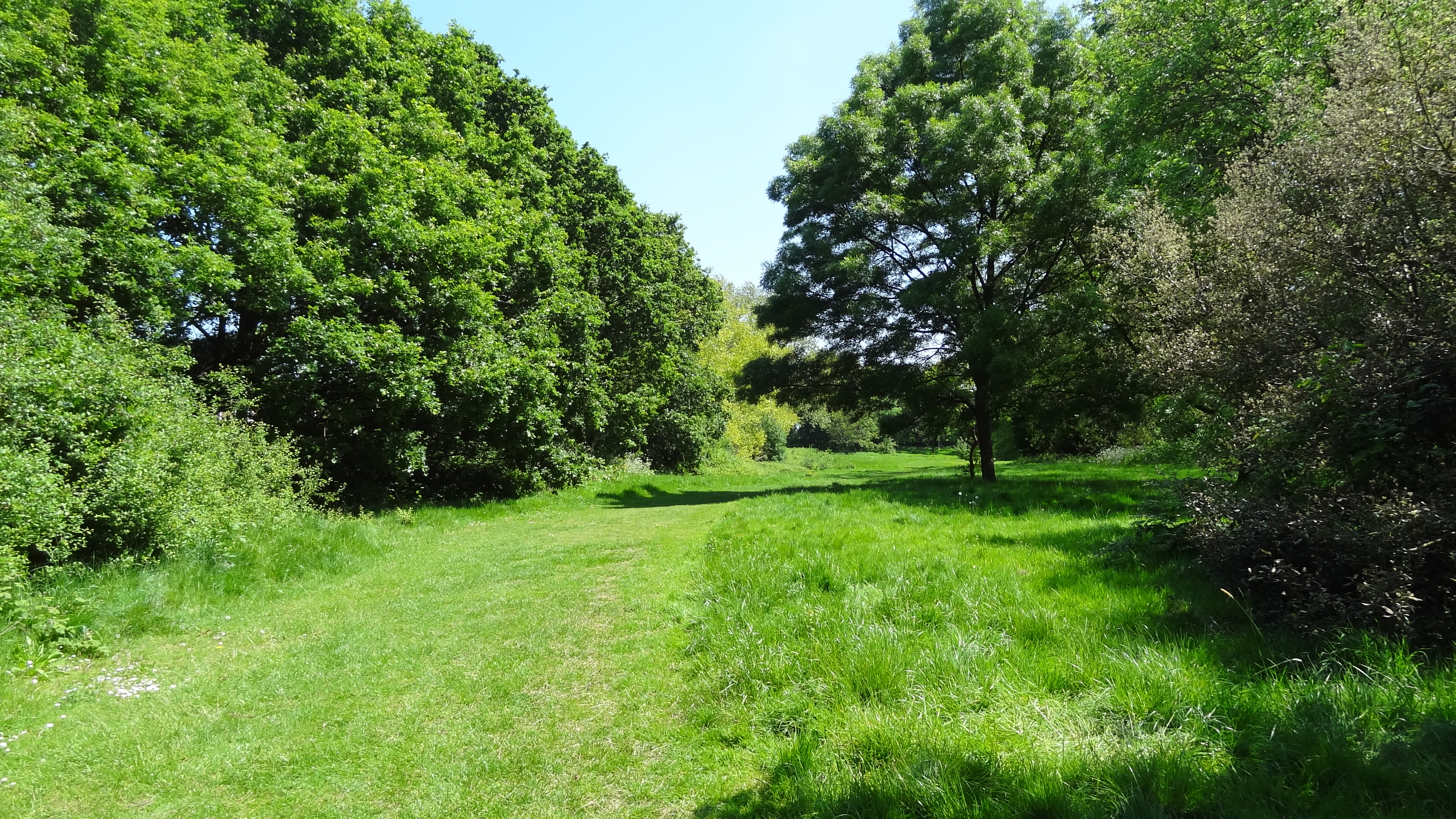
Bethune Park nature area

Bethune Park or Bethune Recreation Ground is a public park in Friern Barnet in the London Borough of Barnet. Most of it is mown grass, and it also has a large nature reserve area, a children's playground, a basketball court and a tennis court.

The site was acquired by Friern Barnet Urban District Council in 1924, and opened as Bethune Recreation Ground in 1926. It is called Bethune Park in notices on the site.

There is access from the corner of Manor Drive and Gresham Avenue, from Beaconsfield Road and from Bethune Avenue.

== See also ==
- Barnet parks and open spaces
