= Tudor Sports Ground =

Park in London, England

Coordinates: 51.65693°N 0.17690°W

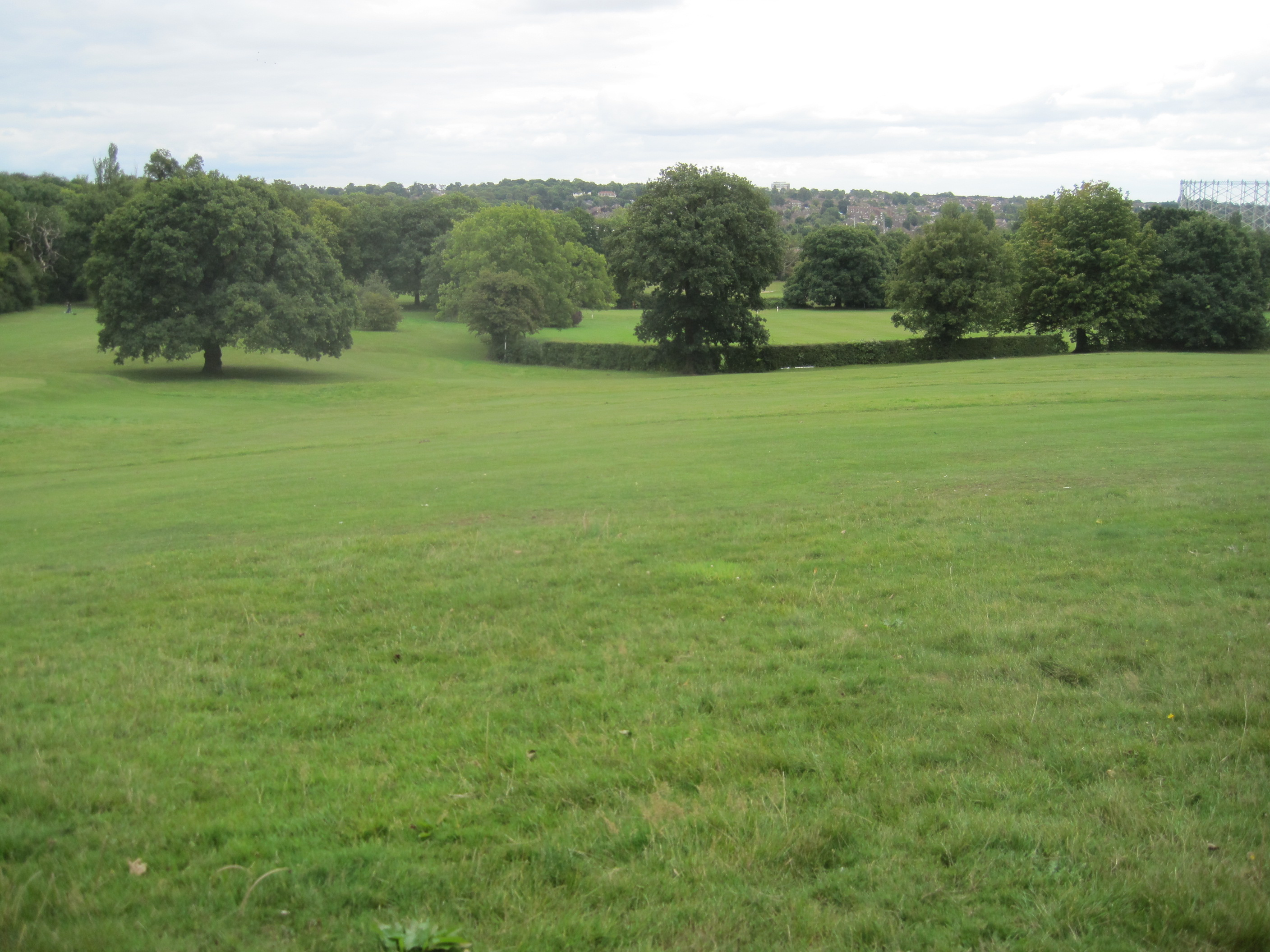
Tudor Sports Ground

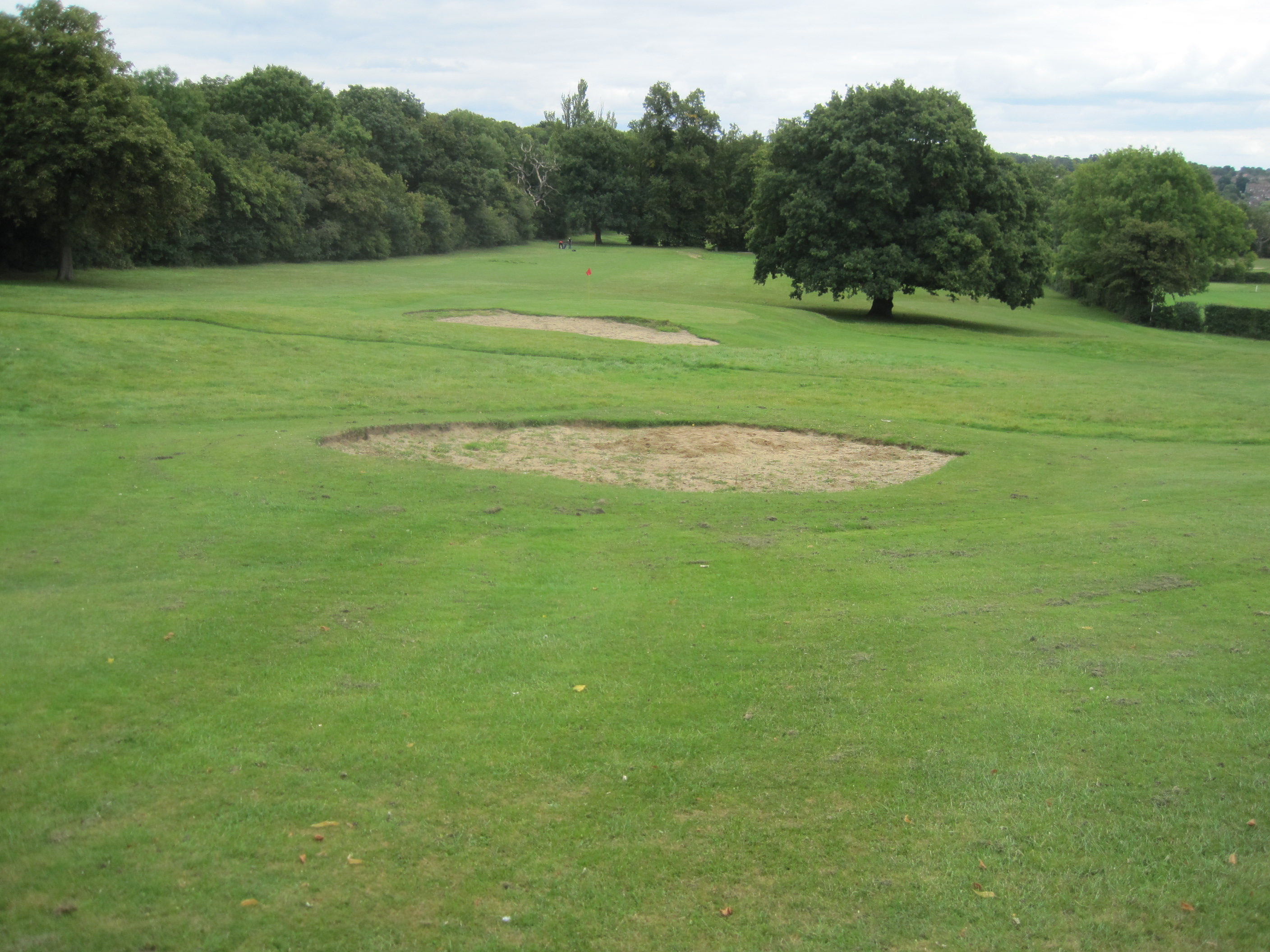
Bunkers on the golf course

Tudor Sports Ground is a public park between Clifford Road and the East Coast Main Railway Line in New Barnet in the London Borough of Barnet. It is one of Barnet's 'Premier Parks'.

The park is a large grassed area with scattered mature trees. The site is mainly devoted to an 18 hole footgolf course, claimed to be the largest in London. It also has a cricket pitch, a tennis court, a basketball shooting area, children's playgrounds and a car park.

The park is adjacent to Monken Hadley Common on its northern side, and a footpath next to the railway on its eastern edge runs between Monken Hadley Common and New Barnet railway station.

== See also ==
- Barnet parks and open spaces
