= Swan Lane Open Space =

Public park in Whetstone, London

Coordinates: 51°37′29″N 0°10′45″W

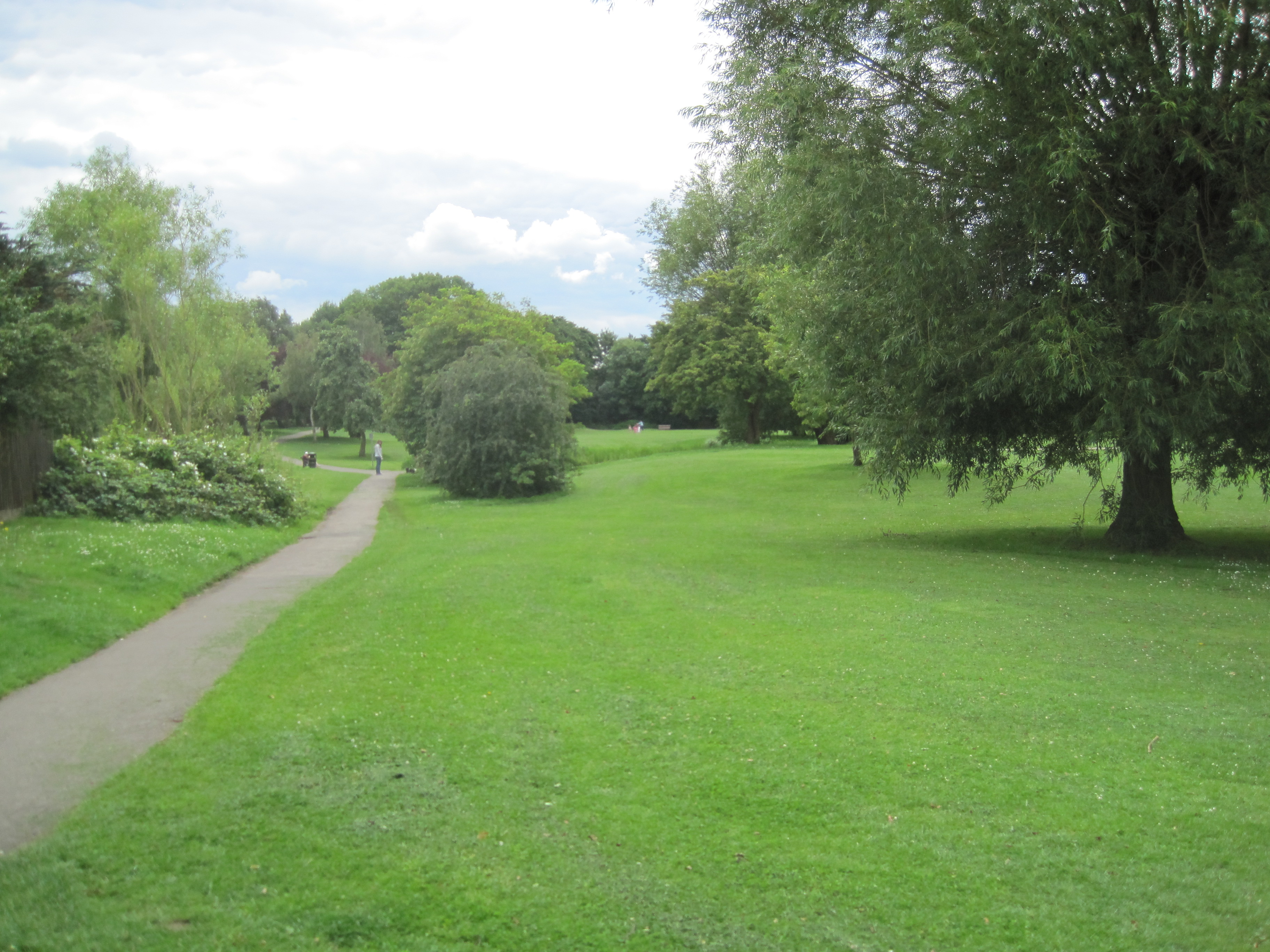
Swan Lane Open Space

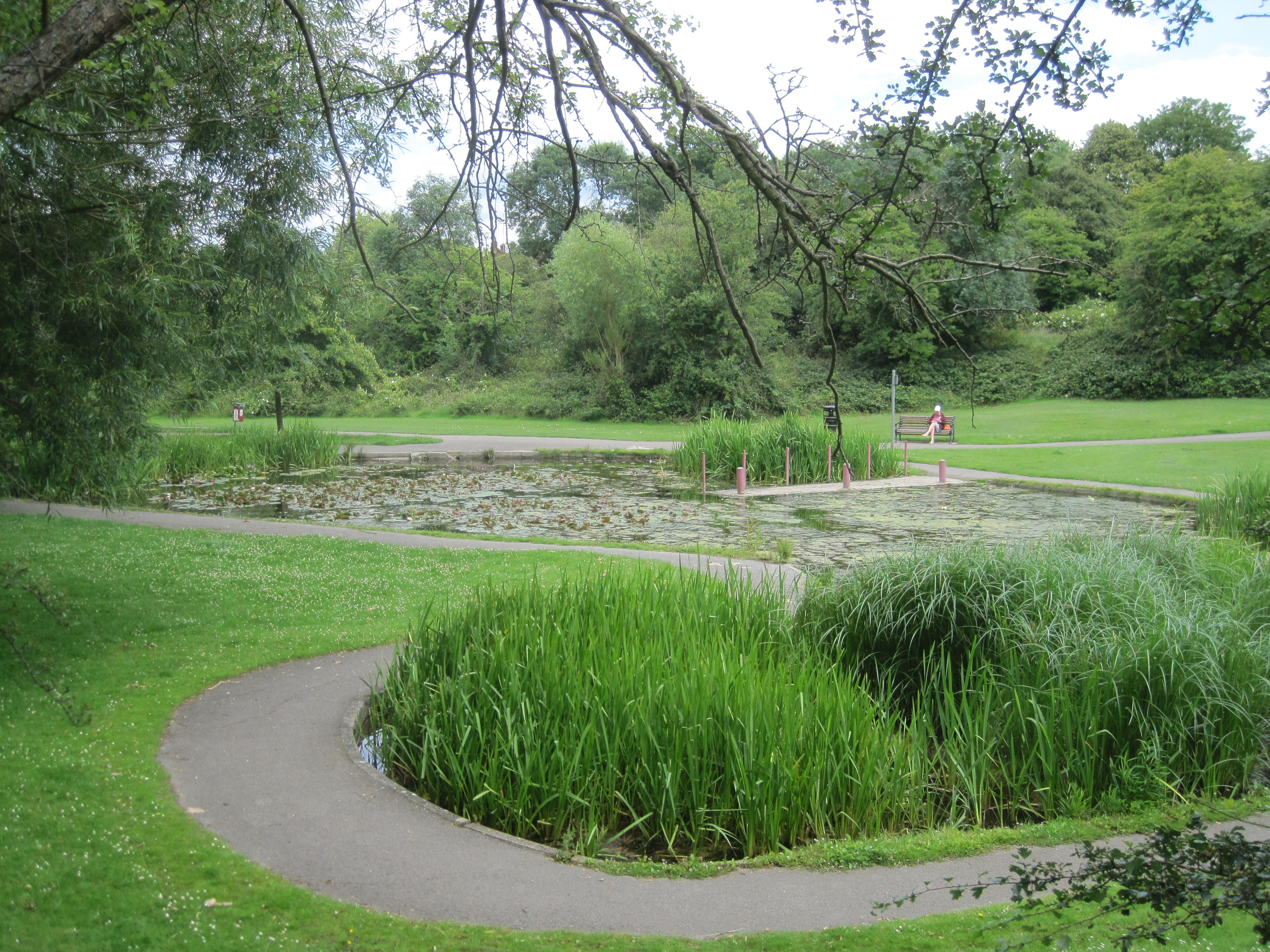
The pond

Swan Lane Open Space is a public park in Whetstone in the London Borough of Barnet. It is the smallest of Barnet's sixteen "Premier Parks". It has a children's playground, a café, and a pond which was formerly used for model boating but is now covered with reeds and water plants. Much of it is mown grass and trees, including giant redwoods and a Cedar of Lebanon, but it also has more natural areas managed for nature conservation.

The park was created around the 1930s on the site of former gravel pits beside a nineteenth-century estate. The park was known locally as "The Pits" in the 1960s and probably earlier. The pond is a natural spring. It was the scene of a tragedy in the early 1920s when children were drowned while playing in the disused gravel workings. According to a history of a local school, St John's: "Whetstone was the site of a number of gravel pits, particularly in the locality of Swan Lane. They are commemorated in the name still used for the recreation area there. School documents record a tragedy on these pits, which were then disused, in 1925, when a 10-year-old boy who attended the school was drowned with two friends when a raft on which they were floating capsized." In the early 1970s, the park featured in one of the Monty Python films when a scene from the "Hells Grannies" sketches was filmed in the upper part above the keepers lodge. The Wendy House that stood nearby during the 1960s and 1970s can be seen in shot. Rose beds by the café have been planted in memory of two local residents.

There is access from Swan Lane, Whetstone High Road and Woodside Lane.

== See also ==
- Barnet parks and open spaces
