= Bittacy Hill Park =

Park in the London Borough of Barnet, England

Coordinates: 51.611°N 0.215°W

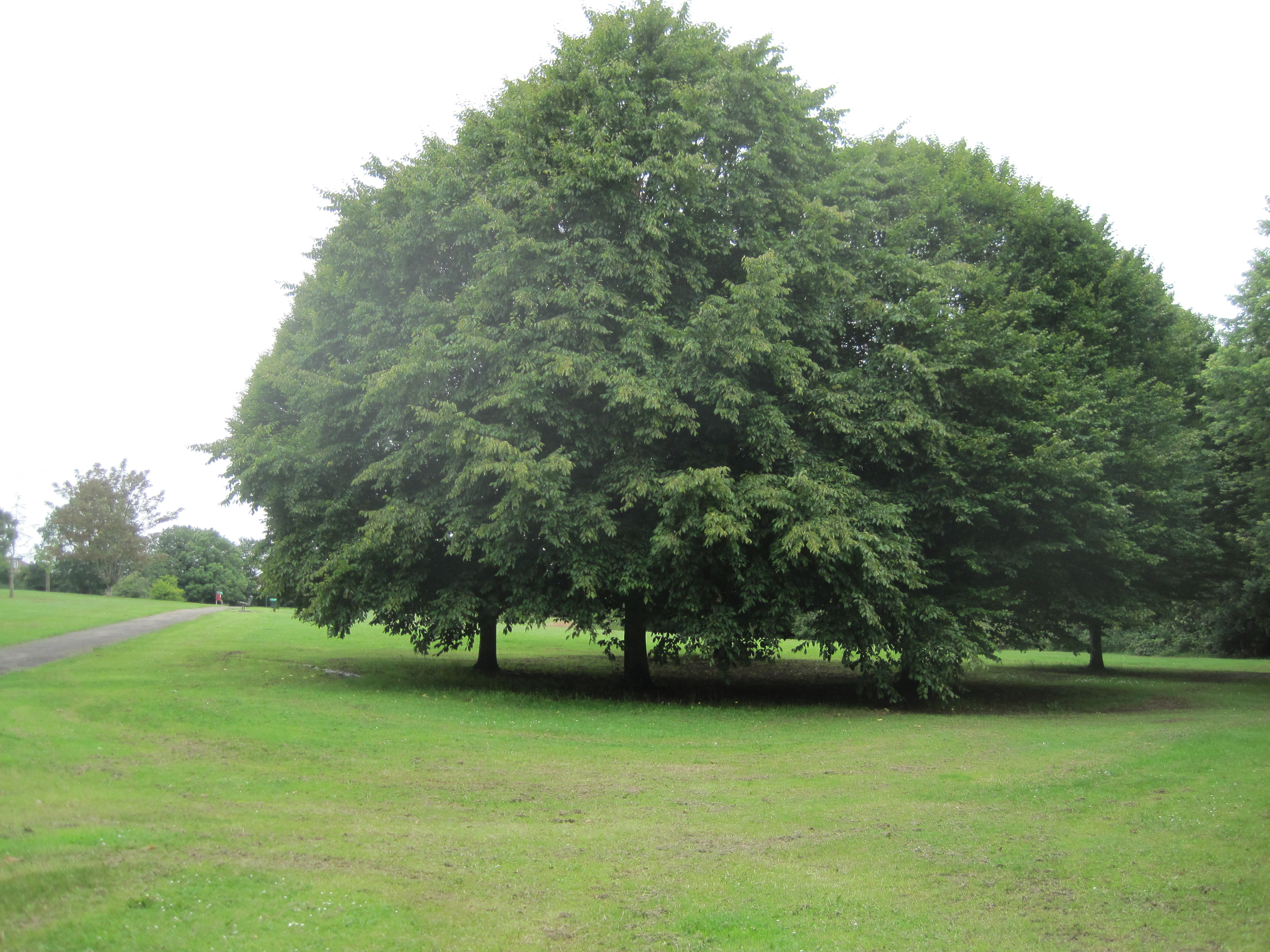

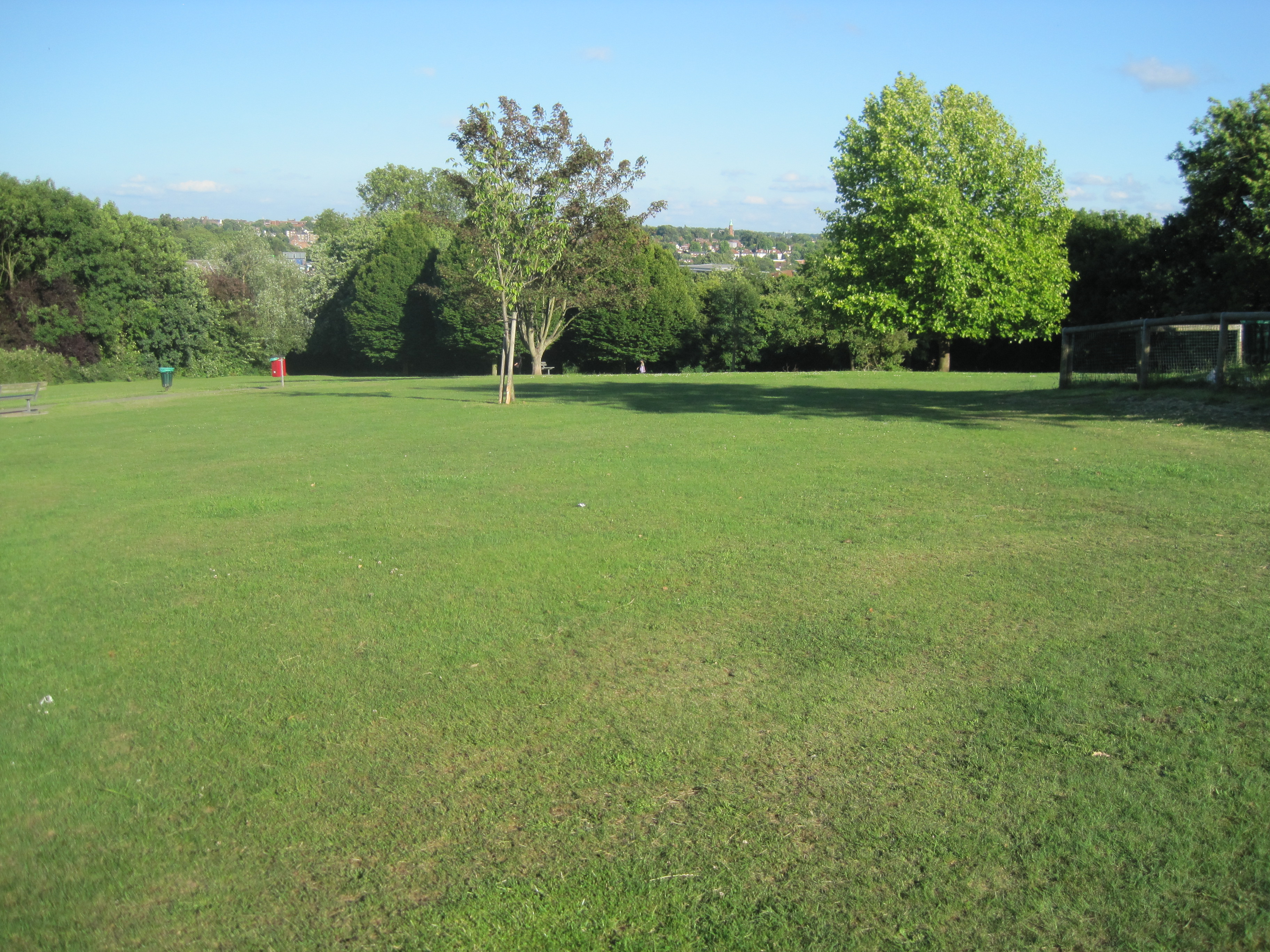

Bittacy Hill Park is a small public park in Mill Hill in the London Borough of Barnet.

It is a hilly grassed area with mature trees, a playground and two free tennis courts.

There is access from Bittacy Hill and Brownsea Walk, and by a footpath from between 27 and 29 Bittacy Rise.

== See also ==
- Barnet parks and open spaces
