= Mill Hill Park =

Park in Barnet, London, England

Coordinates: 51.613°N 0.239°W

Mill Hill Park is a large (14.3 hectare) public park in Mill Hill in the London Borough of Barnet. It one of Barnet's premier parks and it has been given a Green Flag Award.

The park straddles the A1 with the main park to the east linked by an underpass to a smaller mainly grassed area to the west. It has formal flowerbeds, large areas of mown grassland, many impressive mature trees, and a Community Forest Nature Reserve, planted in 1993-94. Recreational facilities include a cricket pitch, football pitches, three tennis courts, a basketball court, two bowling greens, crazy golf, children's playgrounds, a cafe, car parks and toilets. It is supported by a full-time keeper and an active Friends of Mill Hill Park.

There is access from Wise Lane, Daws Lane, Flower Lane, Watford Way and The Rise.

== History ==
The land was once part of Daws Farm, which is believed to have been named after Thomas Daws, who lived in the area in the fourteenth century. In 1923 Hendon District Council purchased the farmland, and it was opened as a park in 1924. In 1965 Hendon became part of the London Borough of Barnet, which has managed the park since then.

== Gallery ==
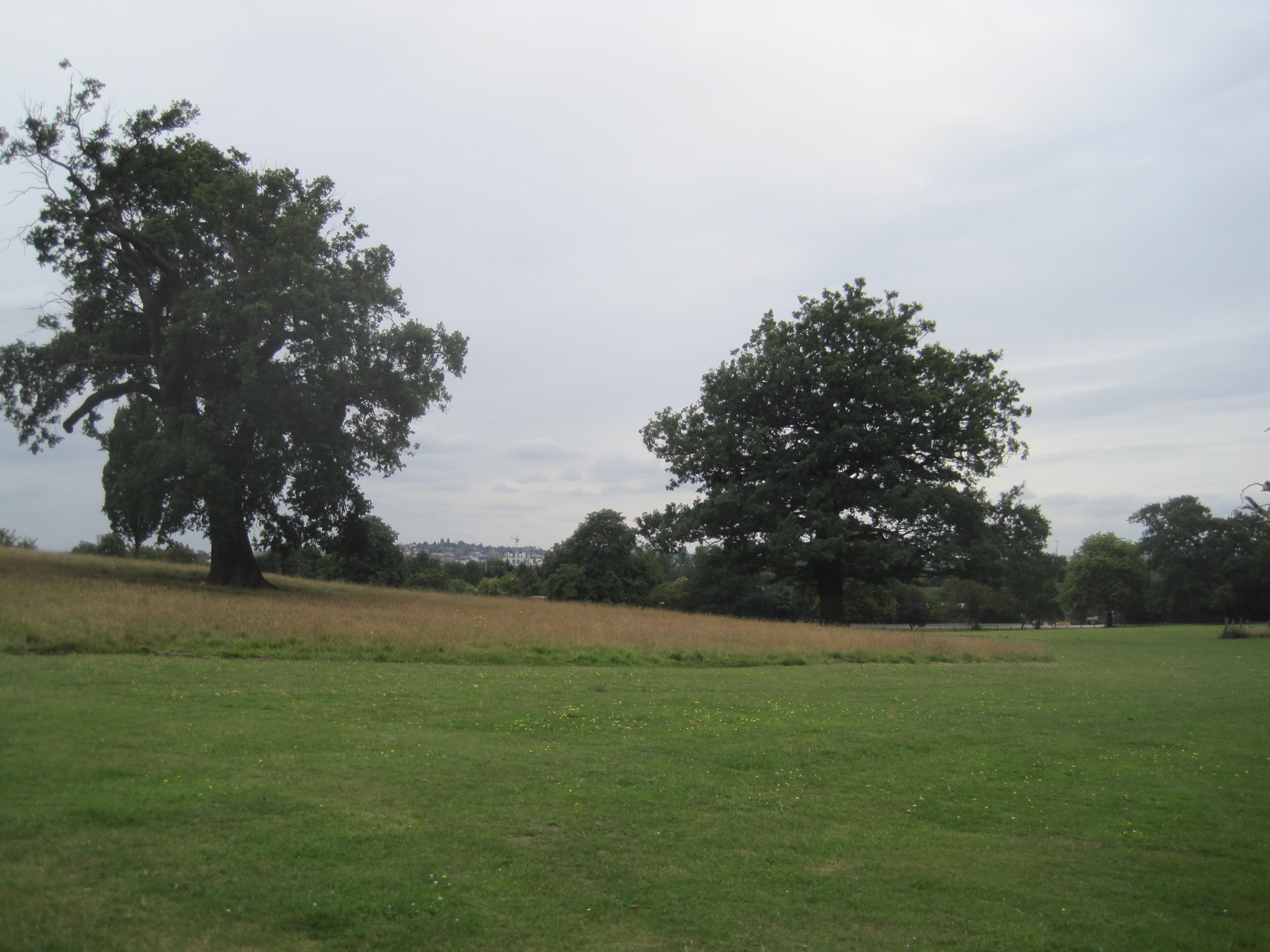
View from west Mill Hill Park

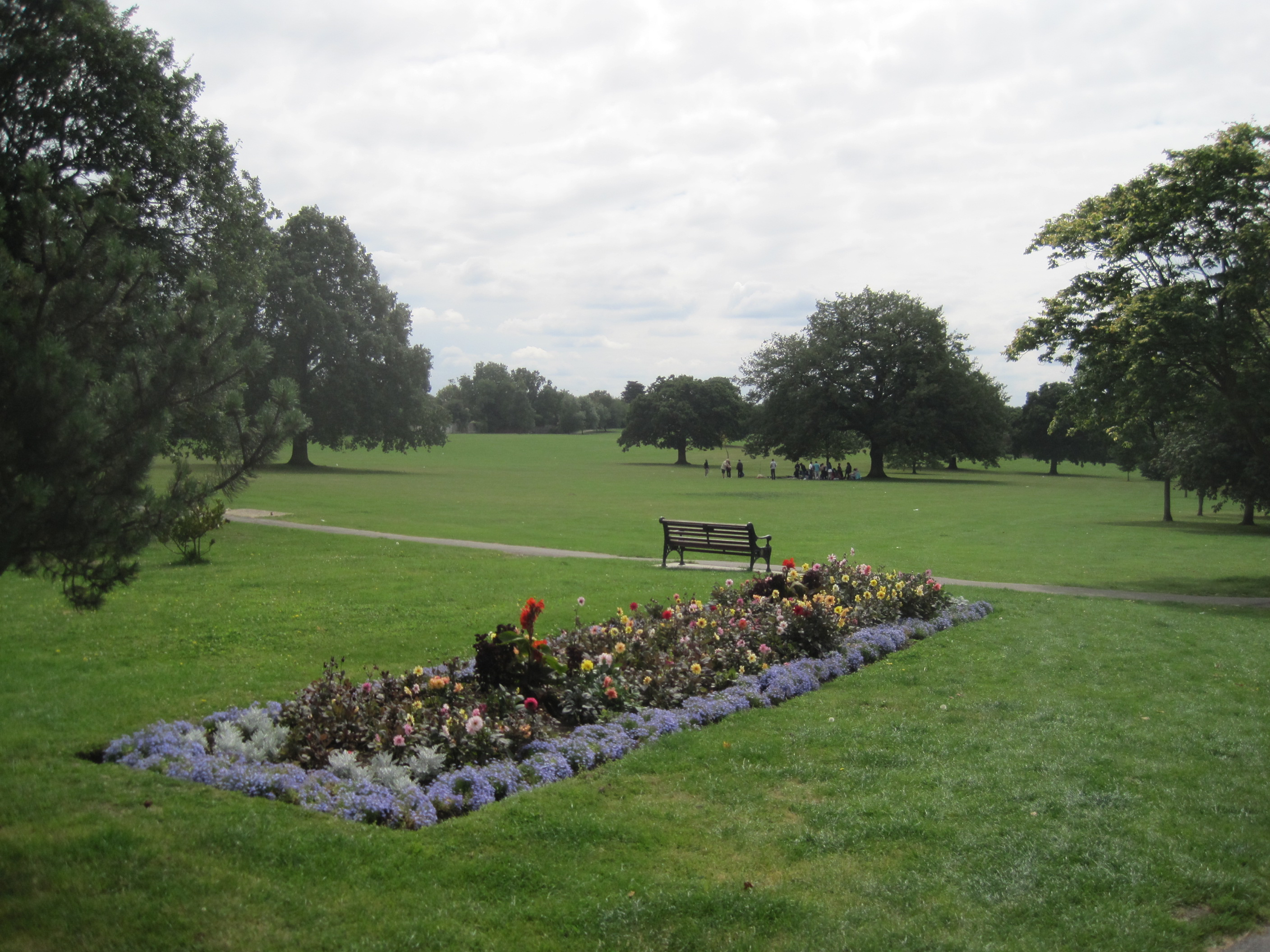

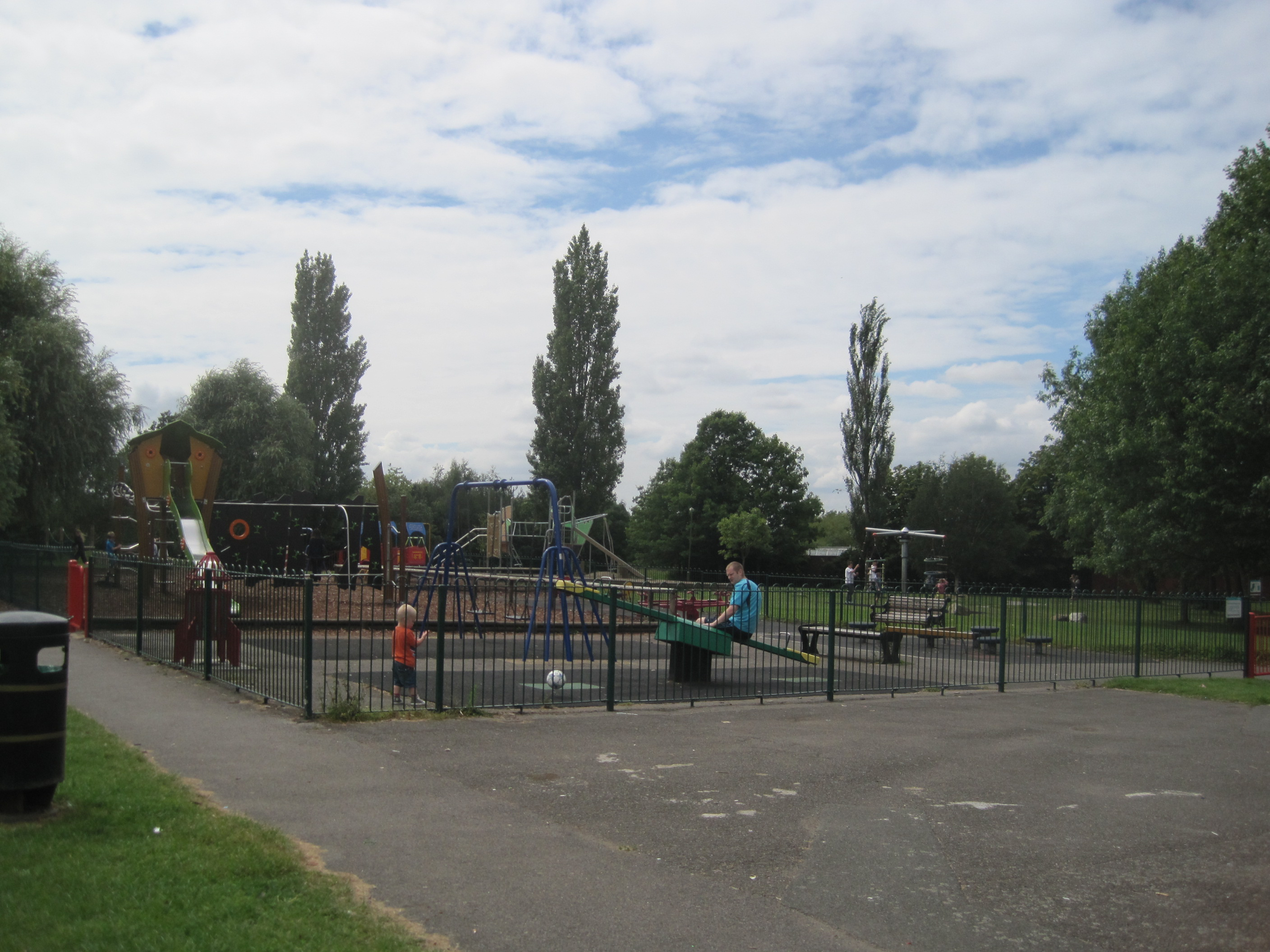
Playground

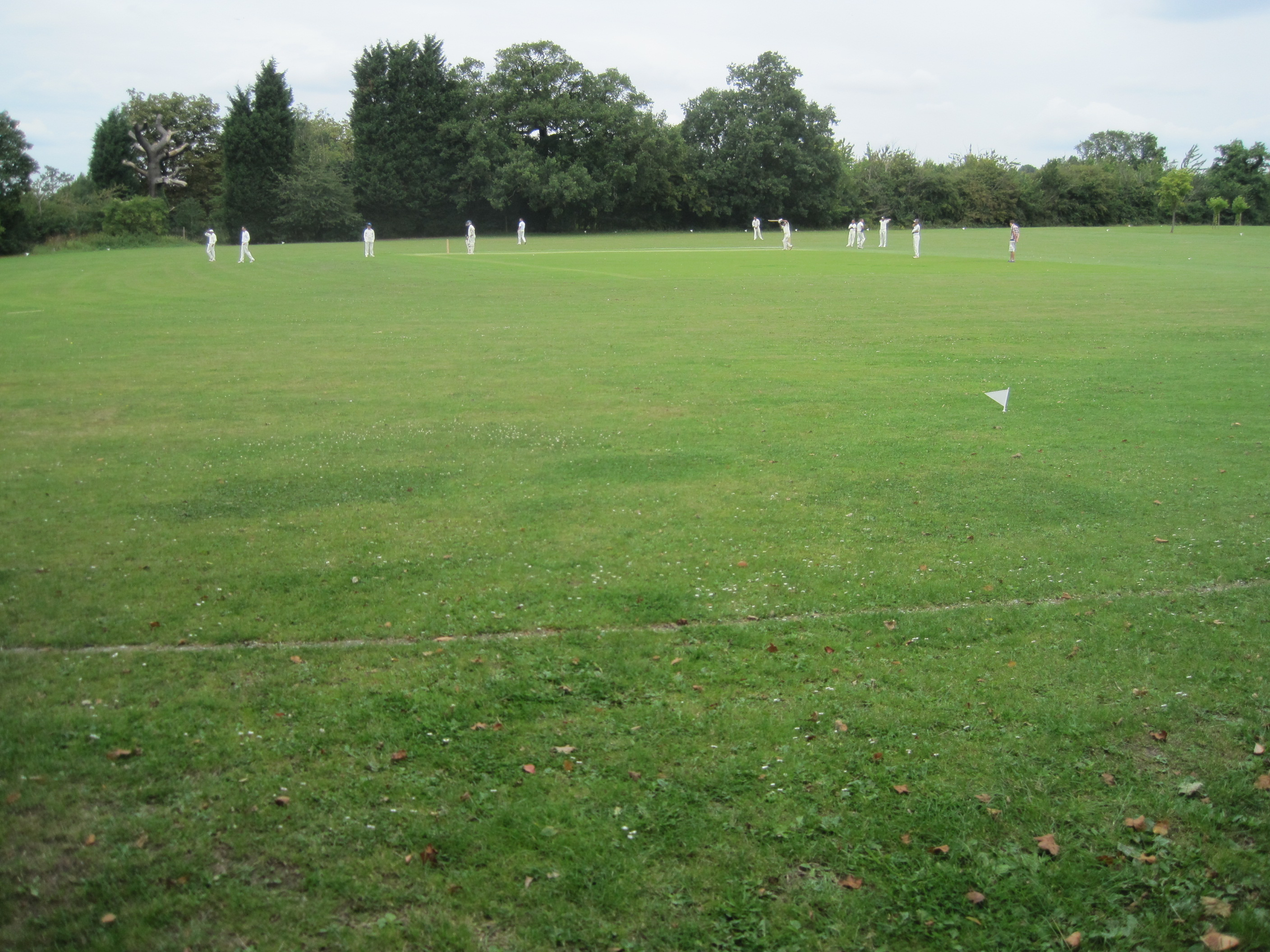
Cricket match

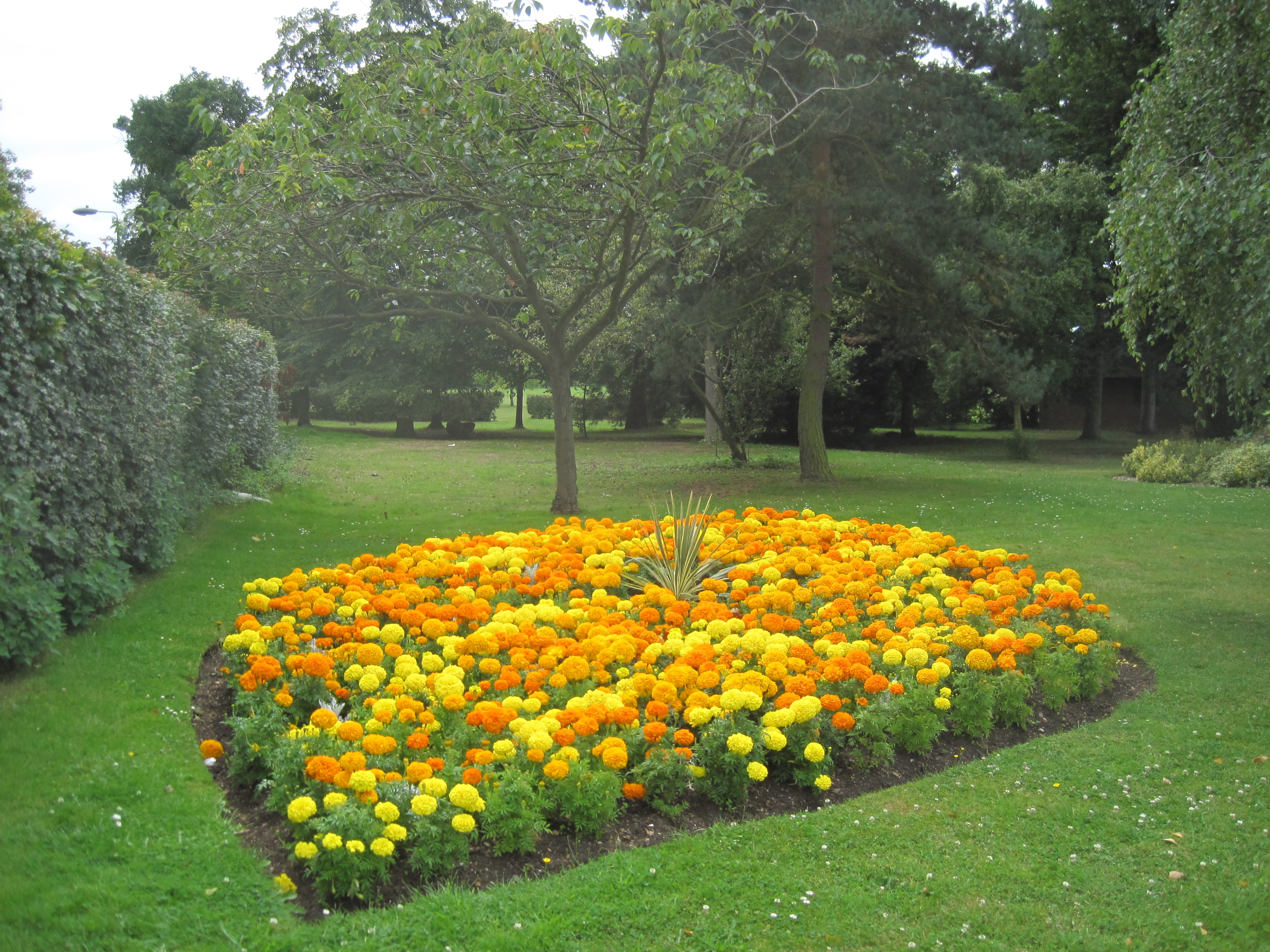

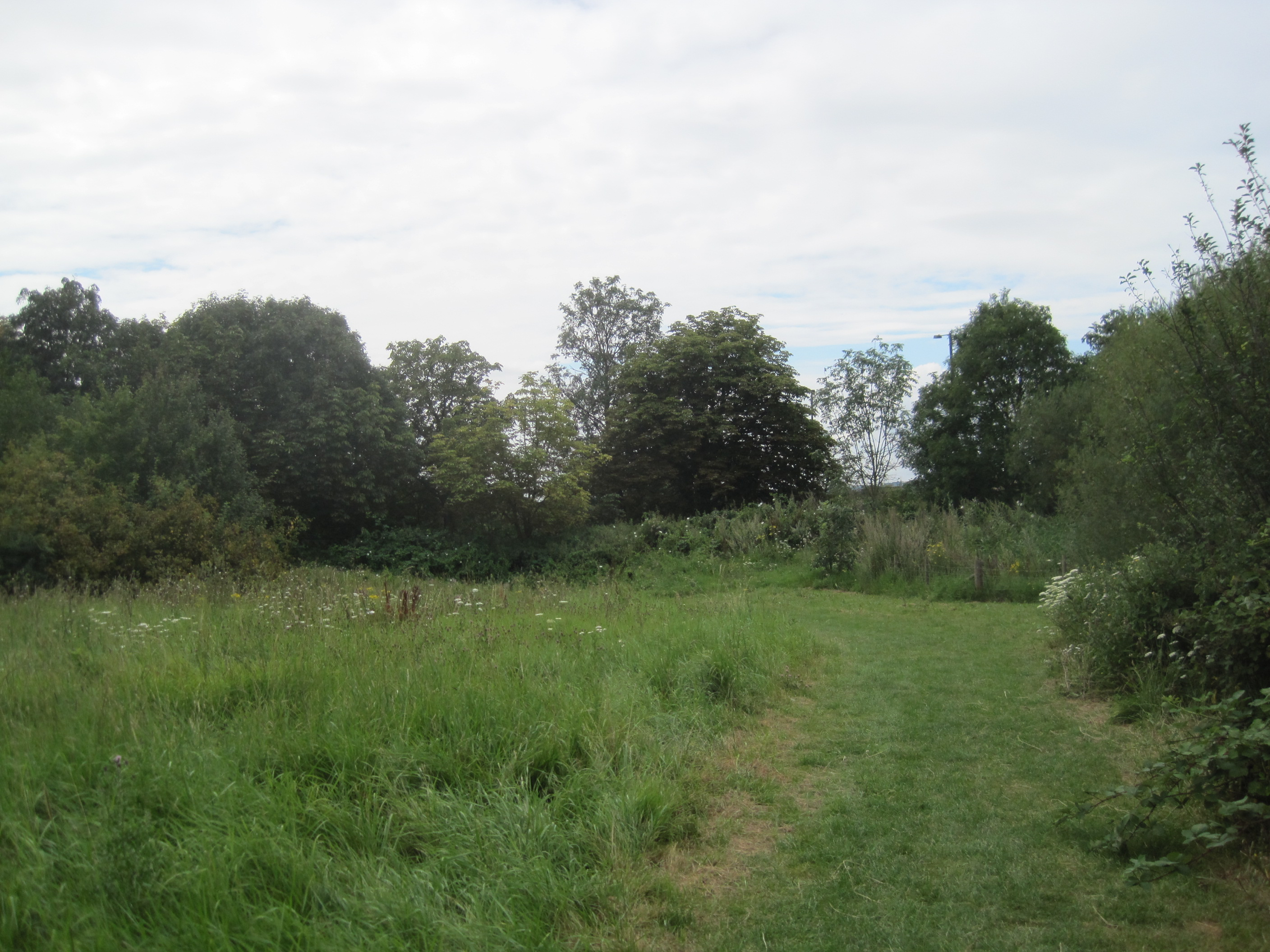
Nature reserve

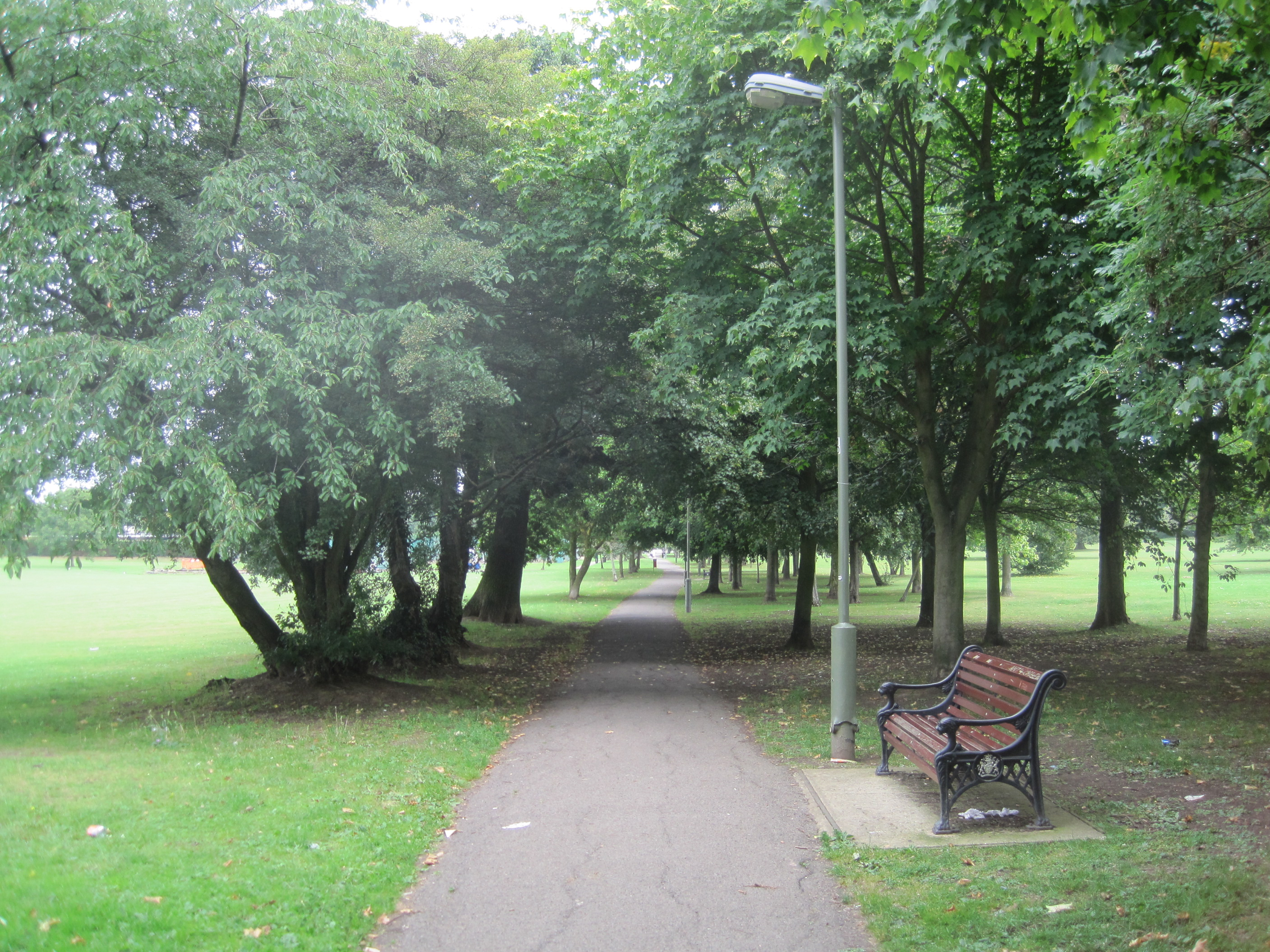

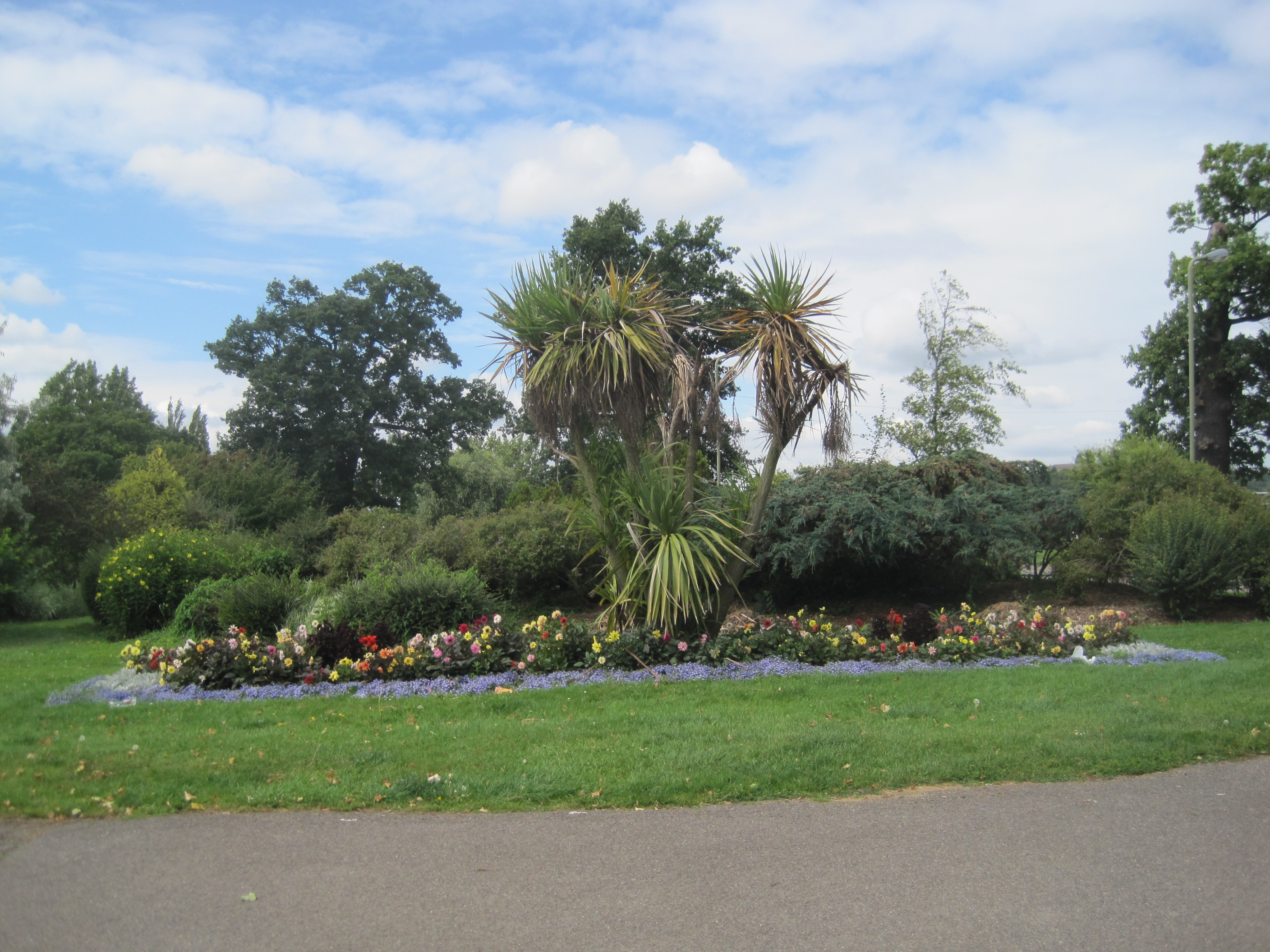

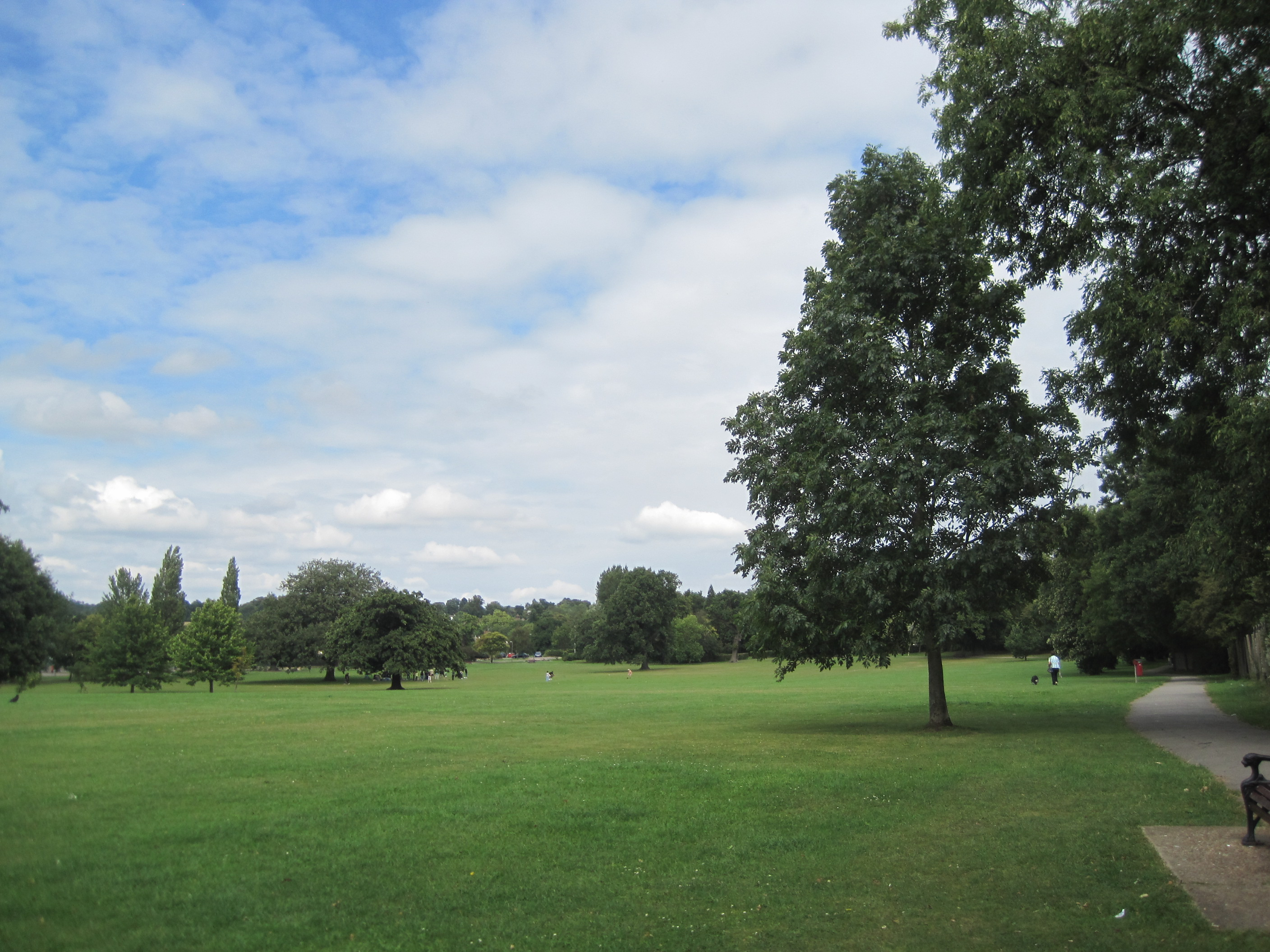

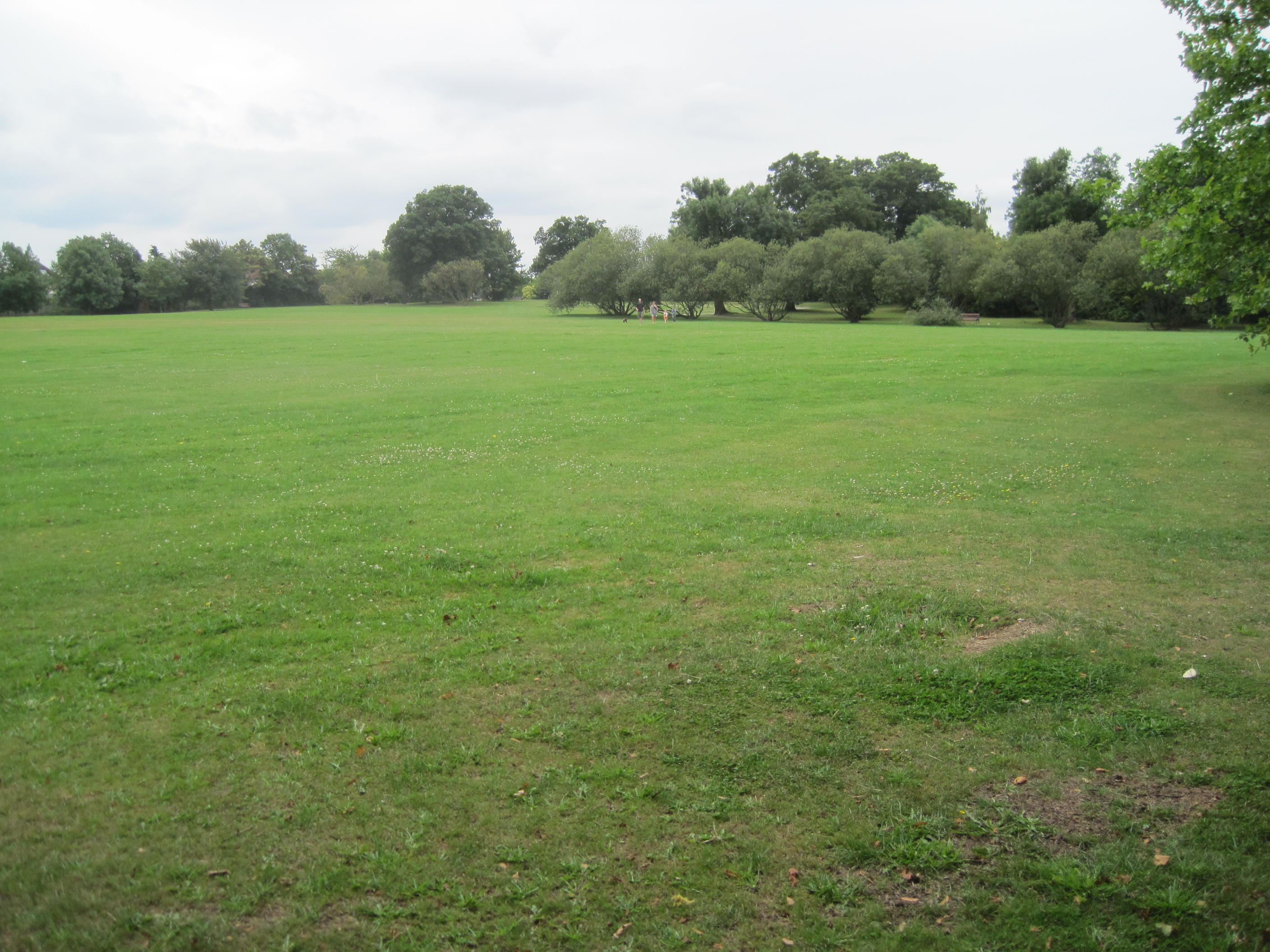

== See also ==
- Barnet parks and open spaces
