= Lyttelton Playing Fields =

Public park in London, England

Coordinates: 51.5836°N 0.1769°W

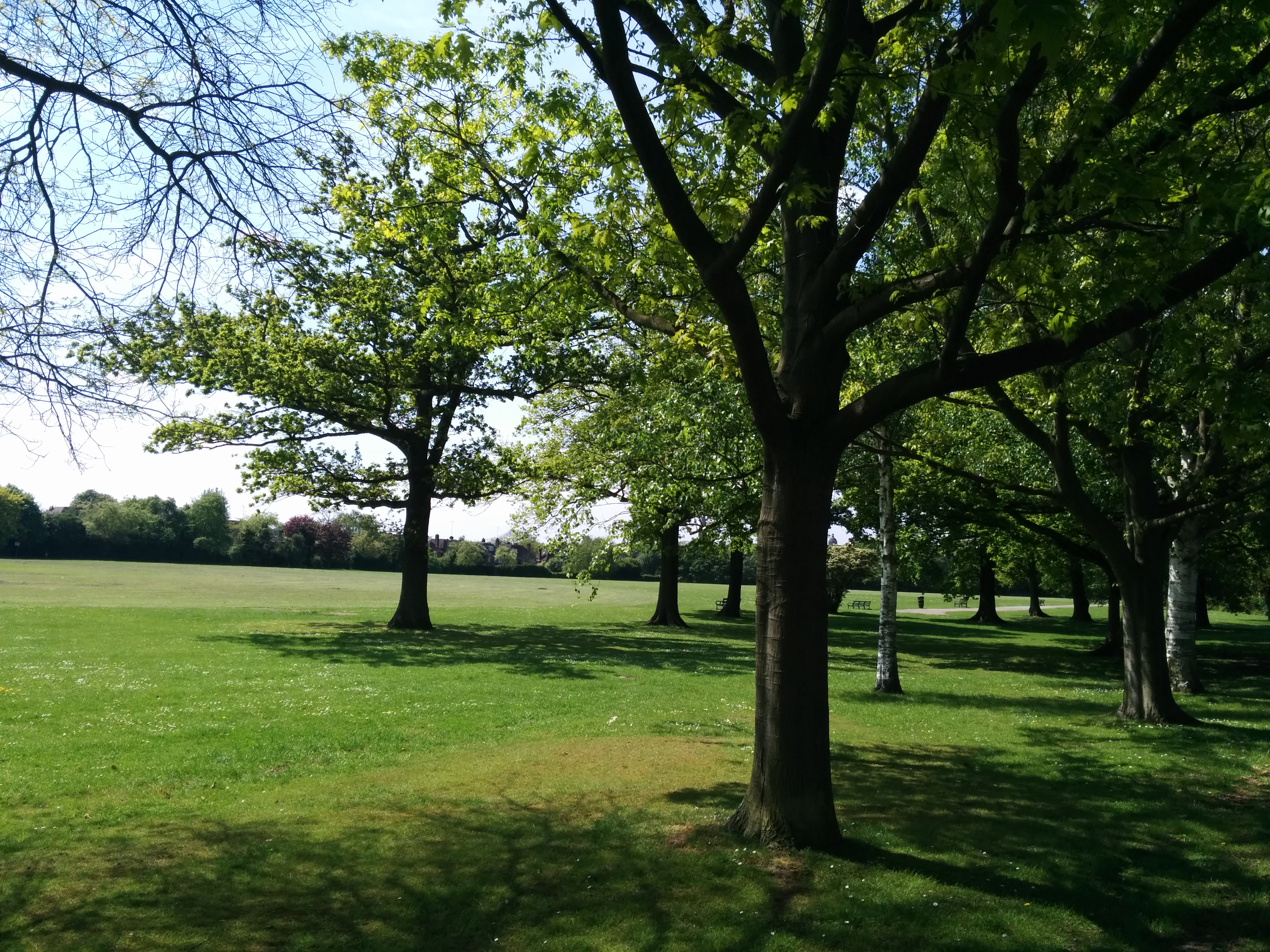
Playing fields

Lyttelton Playing Fields is a 9 hectare public park in Hampstead Garden Suburb in the London Borough of Barnet. It is one of Barnet's 'Premier Parks'.

Most of the site is a large grassed area which can be used for cricket and football, and there are also a children's playground, tennis courts, multisport basketball and football courts, a private bowls club, 2 cricket squares and toilets.

Mutton Brook goes along the north of the site through a small area of old woodland which is shown on Rocque's map of 1754, and was called Watery Wood in an 1864 Ordnance Survey map. The hedgerow along the southern edge once marked the boundary of the Bishop of London's Hornsey Park Estate. There is a small 'Children's Millennium wood' in the north west corner.

Lyttelton Playing Fields has an active friends group which secured Lottery funding in 2011 for renovation.

Access is from Kingsley Way, Lyttelton Road, Norrice Lea and Linden Lea.

== Gallery ==
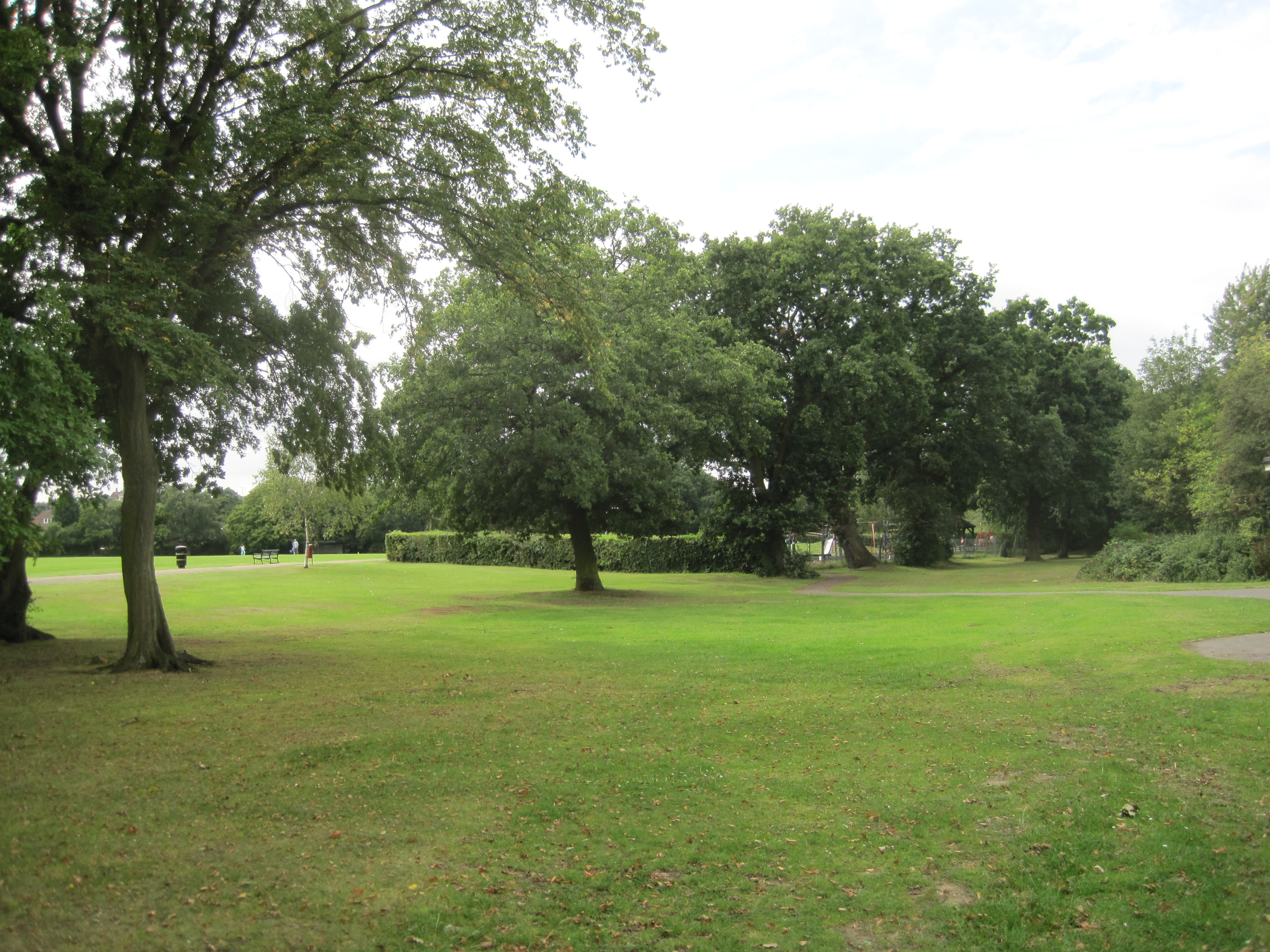

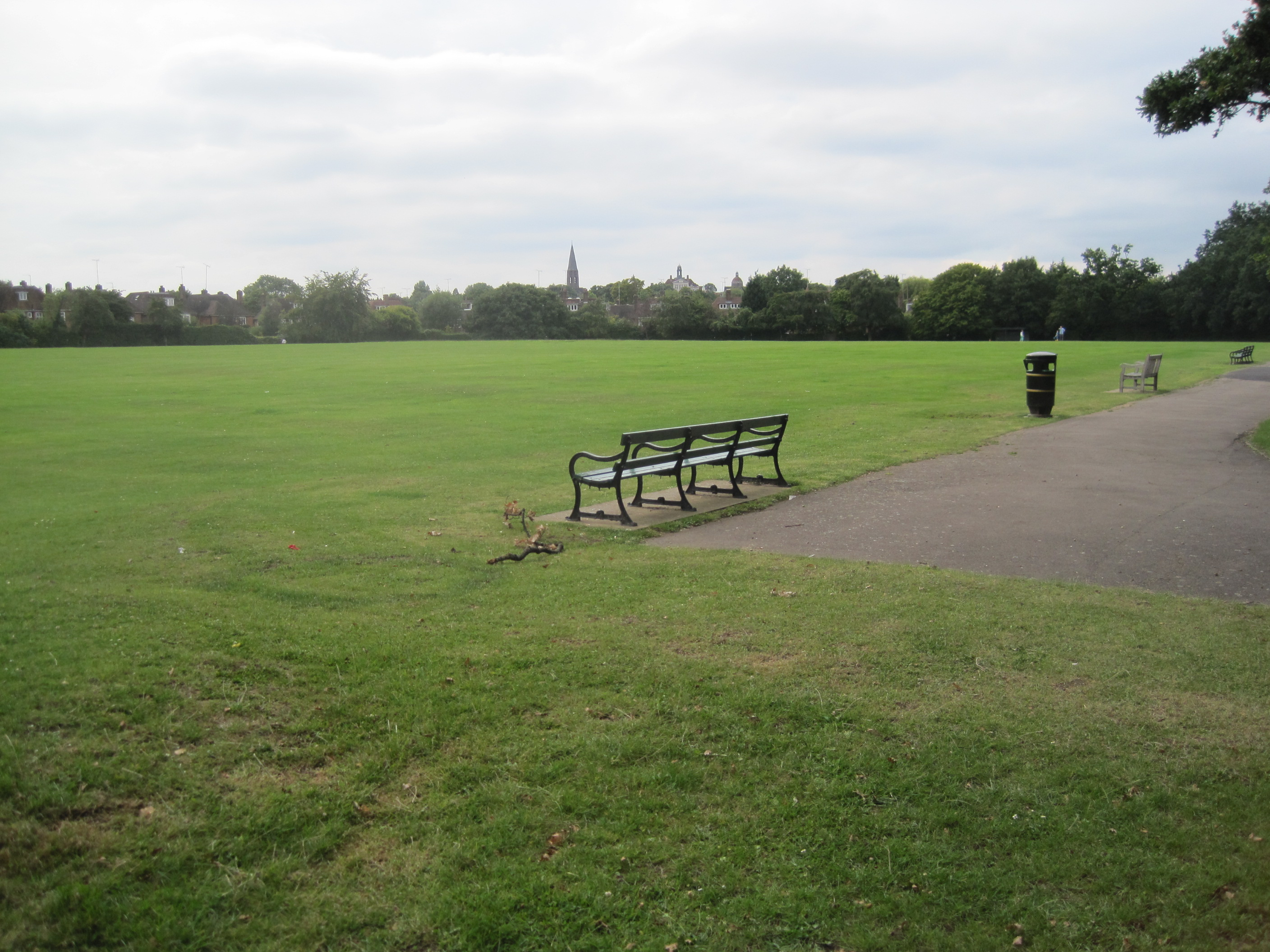

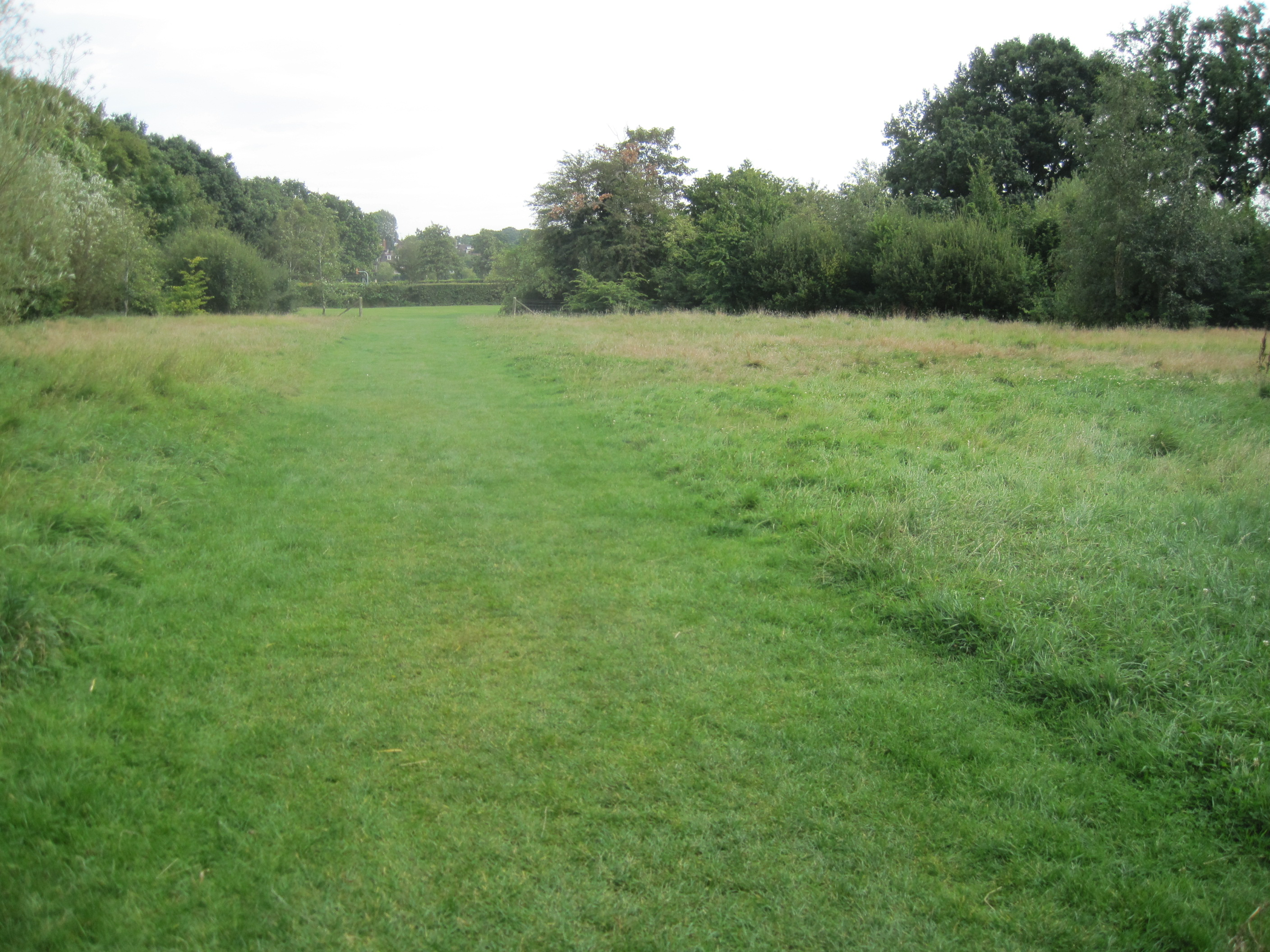

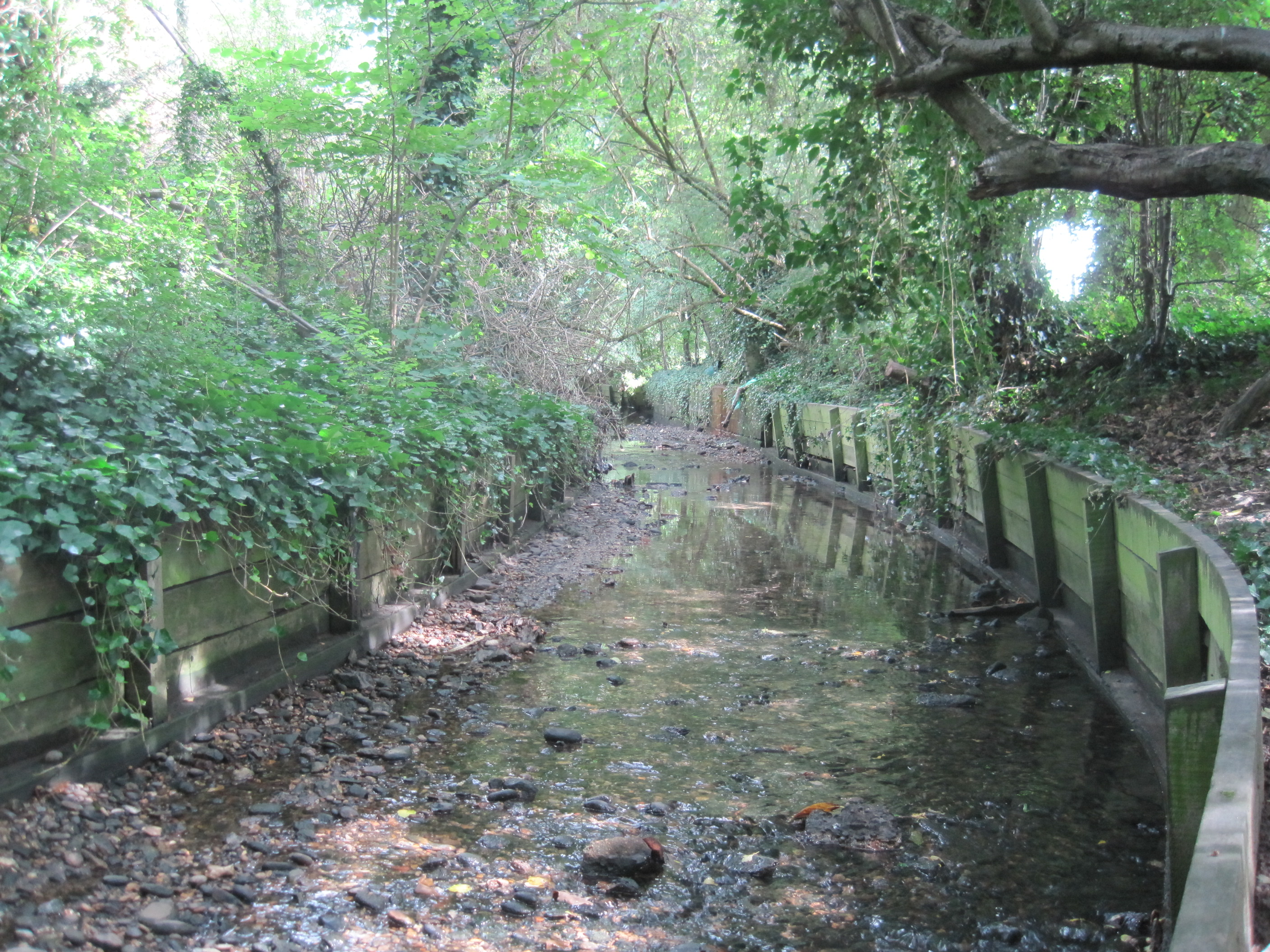

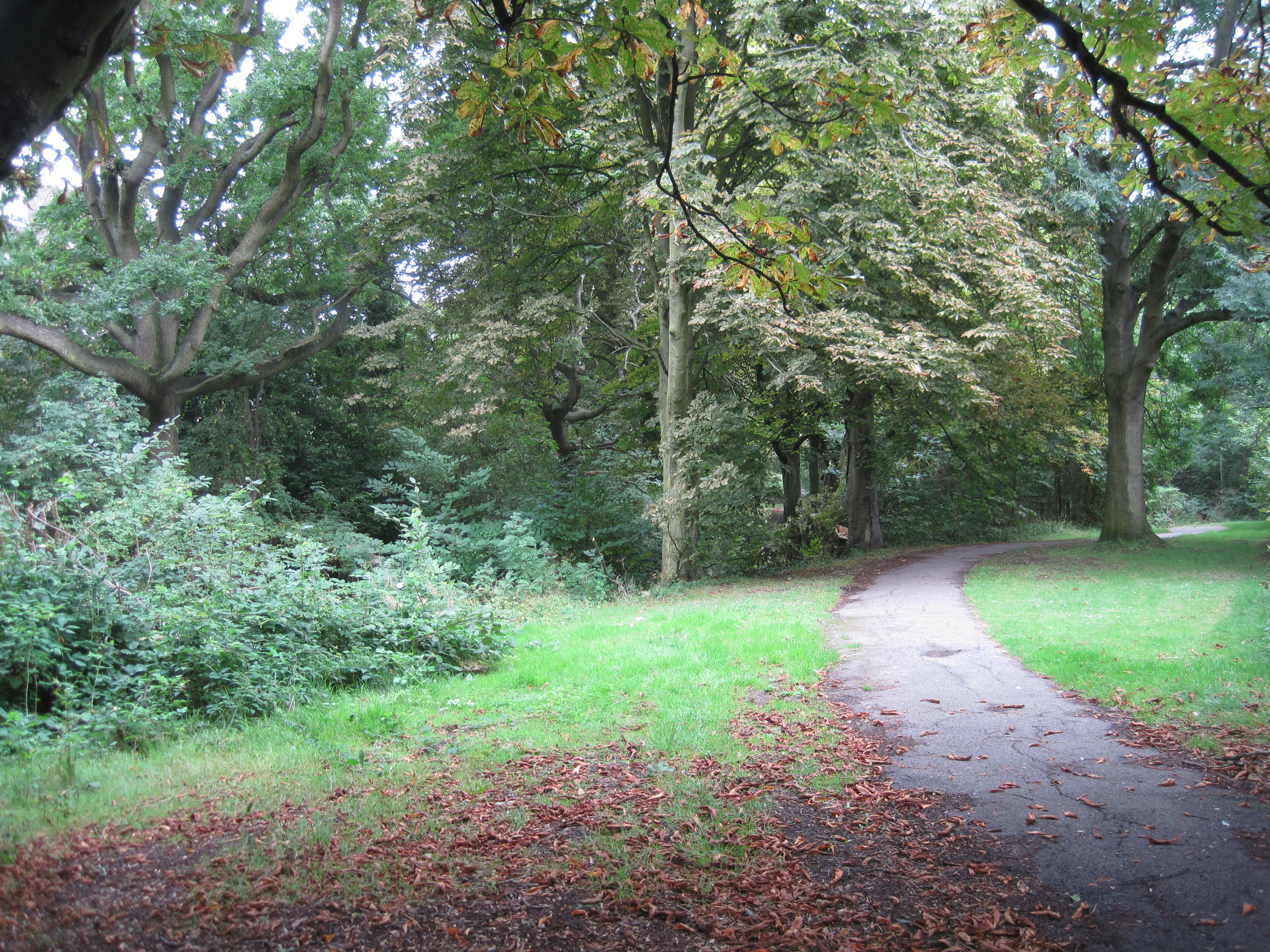

== See also ==
- Barnet parks and open spaces
