= Old Court House Recreation Ground =

Park in High Barnet, London, England

Coordinates: 51.6517°N 0.2028°W

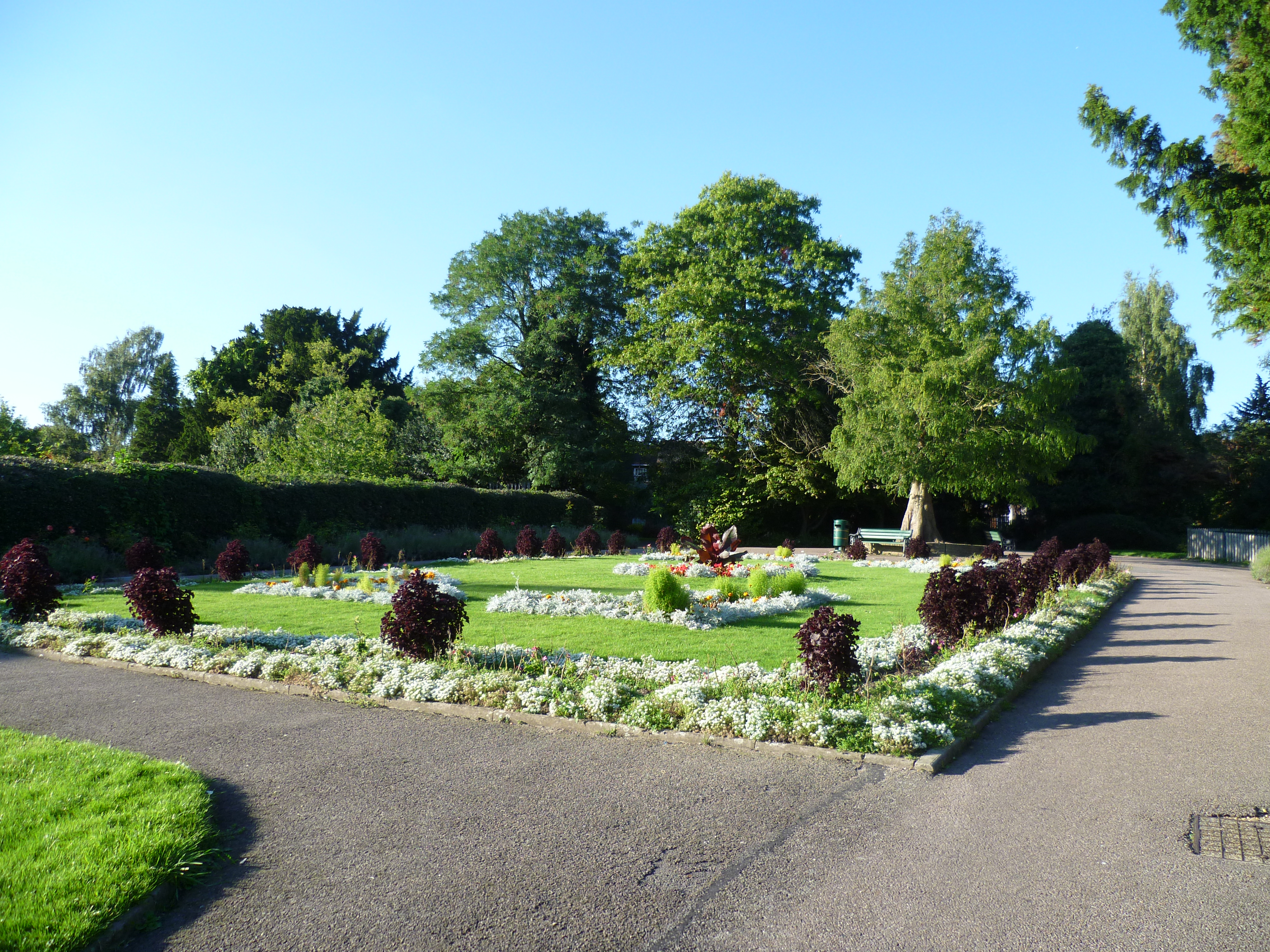
Old Court House Recreation Ground

Old Court House Recreation Ground is a public park in High Barnet in the London Borough of Barnet. It is one of the borough's Premier Parks and received a Green Flag Award for 2009–2010.

The park has six free tennis courts, a bowling green with a pavilion, a children's playground, a café and a car park (off Manor Close). It has formal gardens, grassed areas, rockeries, and a tree trail. Some of the trees are from California, such as a Monterey pine and a Brewer's weeping spruce, planted in the nineteenth century.

== Conservation areas ==
A refurbishment plan carried out since 2007 included the introduction of three conservation areas. The Orchard Conservation Area was formerly an orchard and some fruit trees survive. Old varieties of fruit trees have also been planted and some parts, which were formerly mown short, are now managed for a variety of flowers and herbs. The Bungalow Conservation Area was formerly the park keeper's lodge. It has now been cleared and is managed for nature conservation studies by local schools. A former tennis court has been dug up and left to develop its own wildlife as the Old Disused Tennis Court Conservation Area.

== History ==
The park is named after a county court adjacent to the site which was held until the First World War. In the nineteenth century, the land was owned by the Rumball family and leased as pasture, a brewery and stables. In 1912 the brewery site was purchased by Barnet Urban District Council, and in 1923 the council purchased the Old Court House estate. The park was opened in 1926.

== Access ==
The park is open from 8 a.m. until dusk. There is access from Wood Street, Manor Close, Mays Lane and Orchard Road.

== Gallery ==
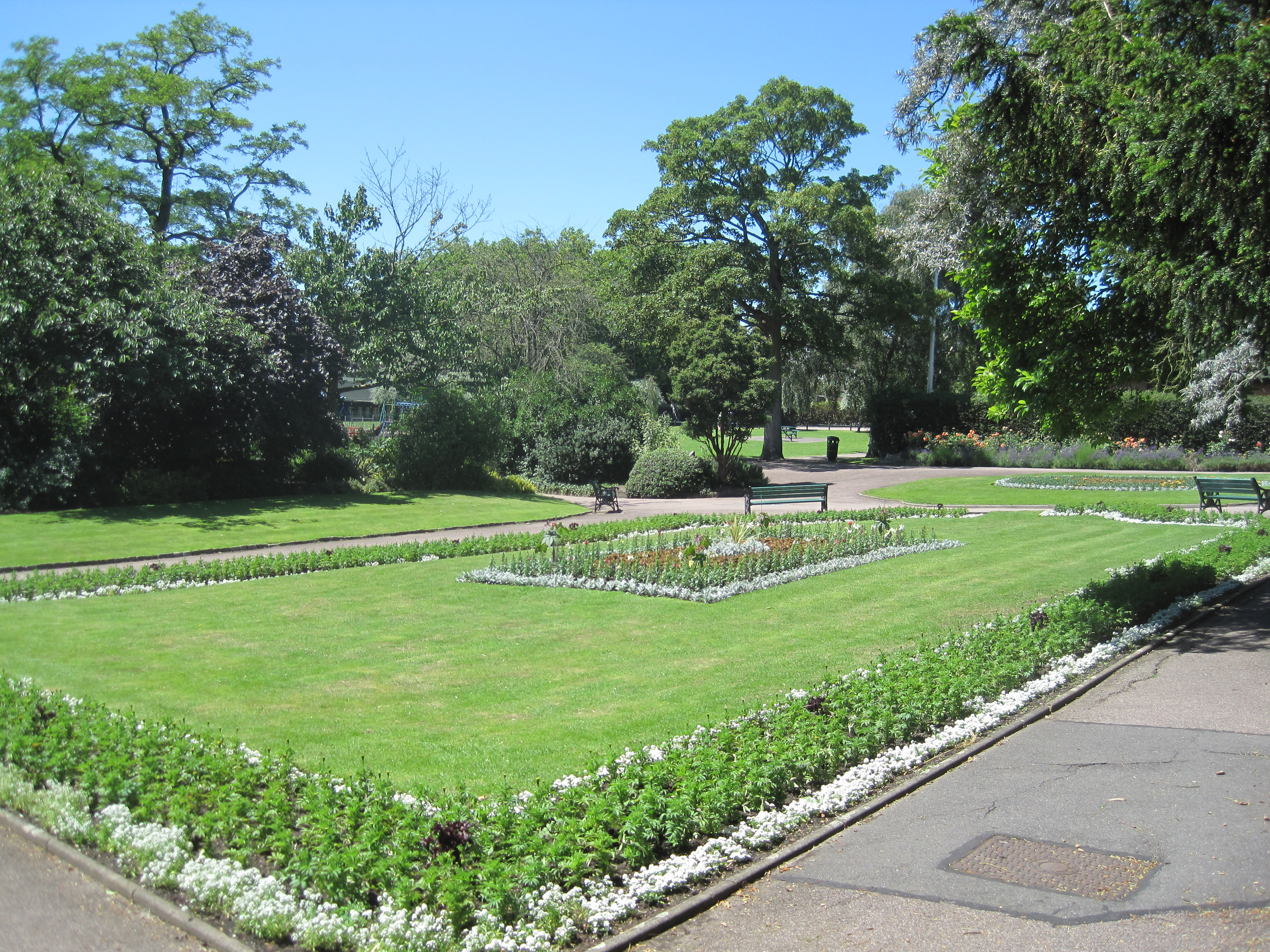
Formal flowerbeds

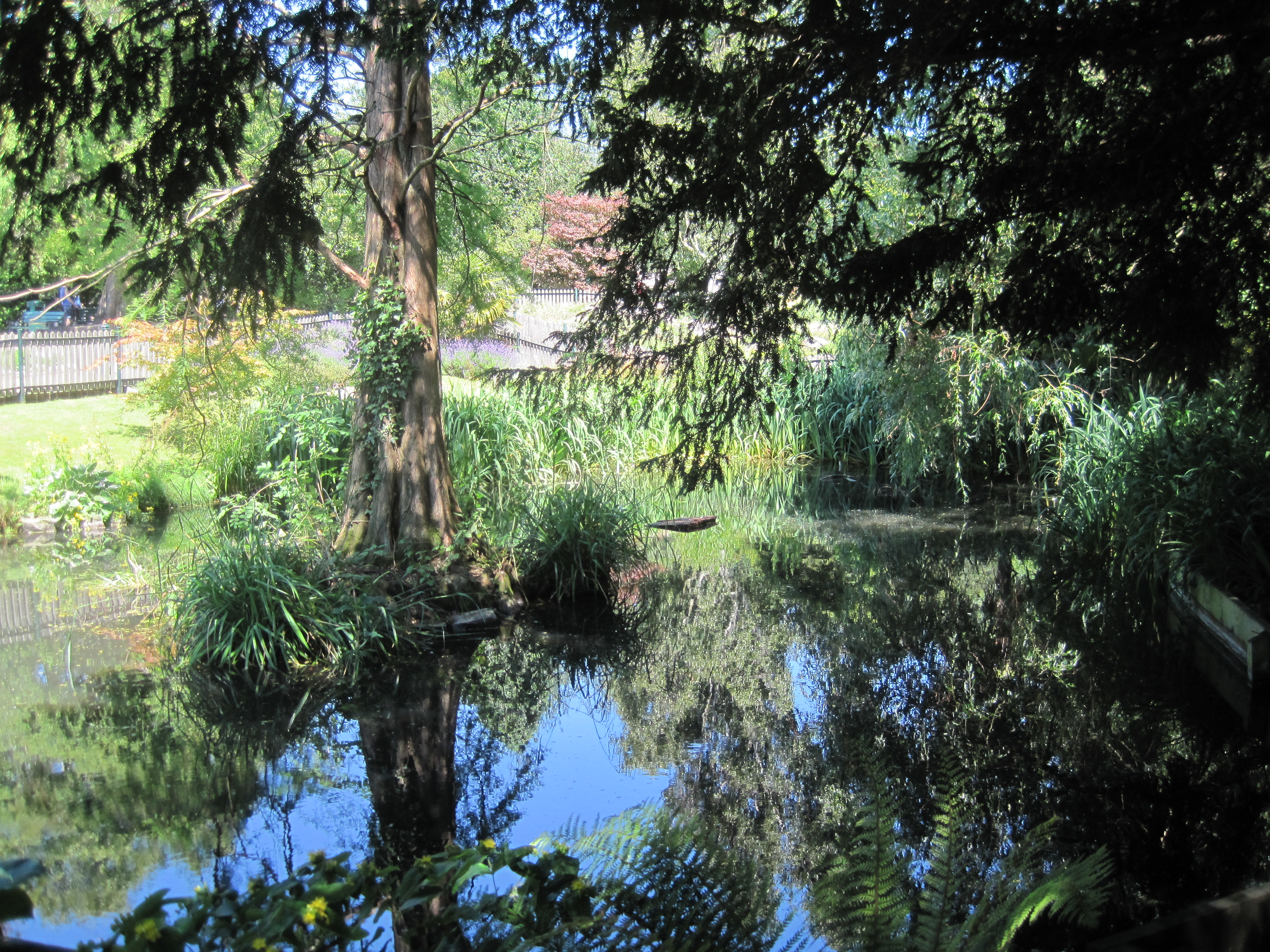
Pond

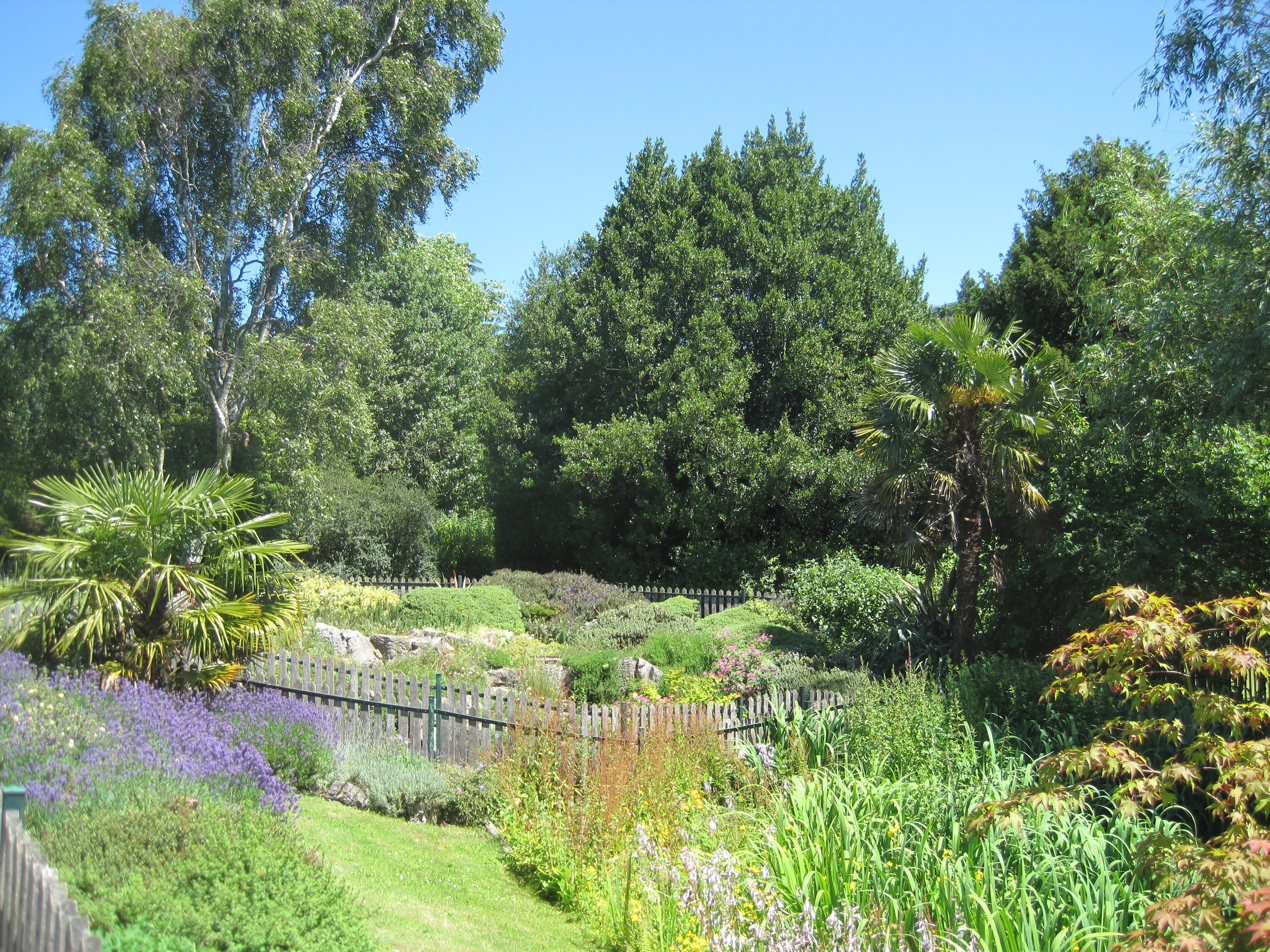
Rockery

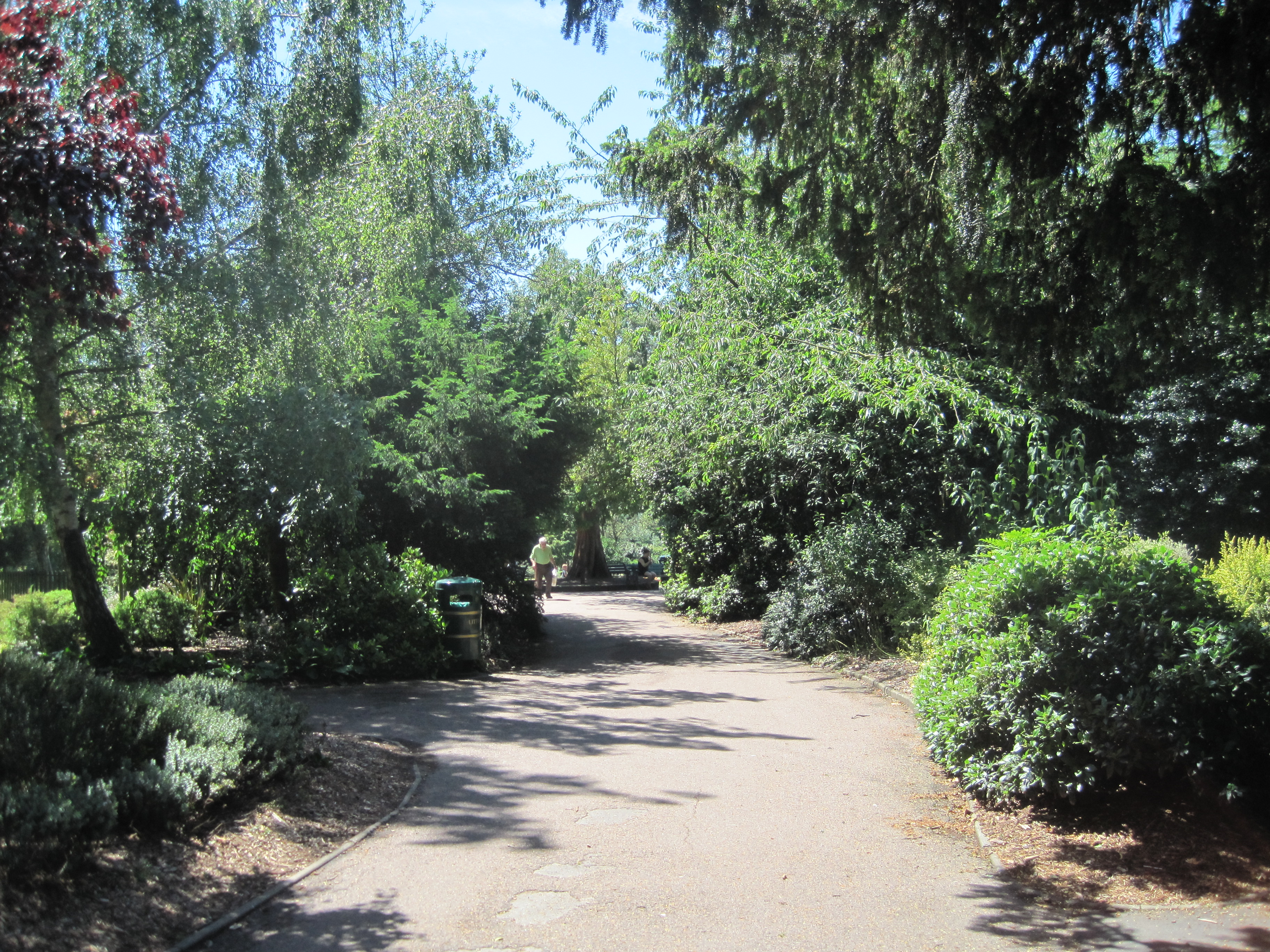
Path

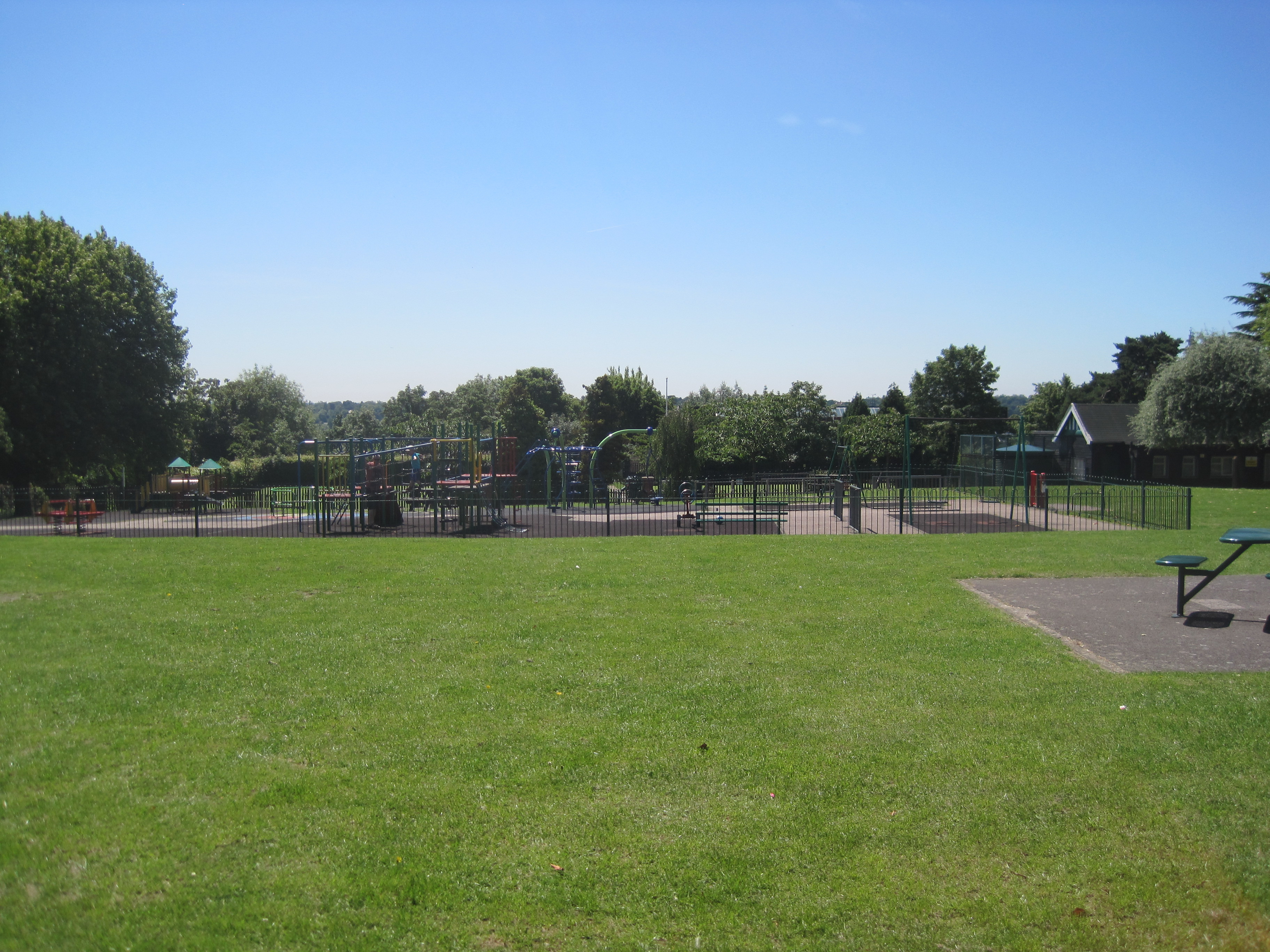
Playground

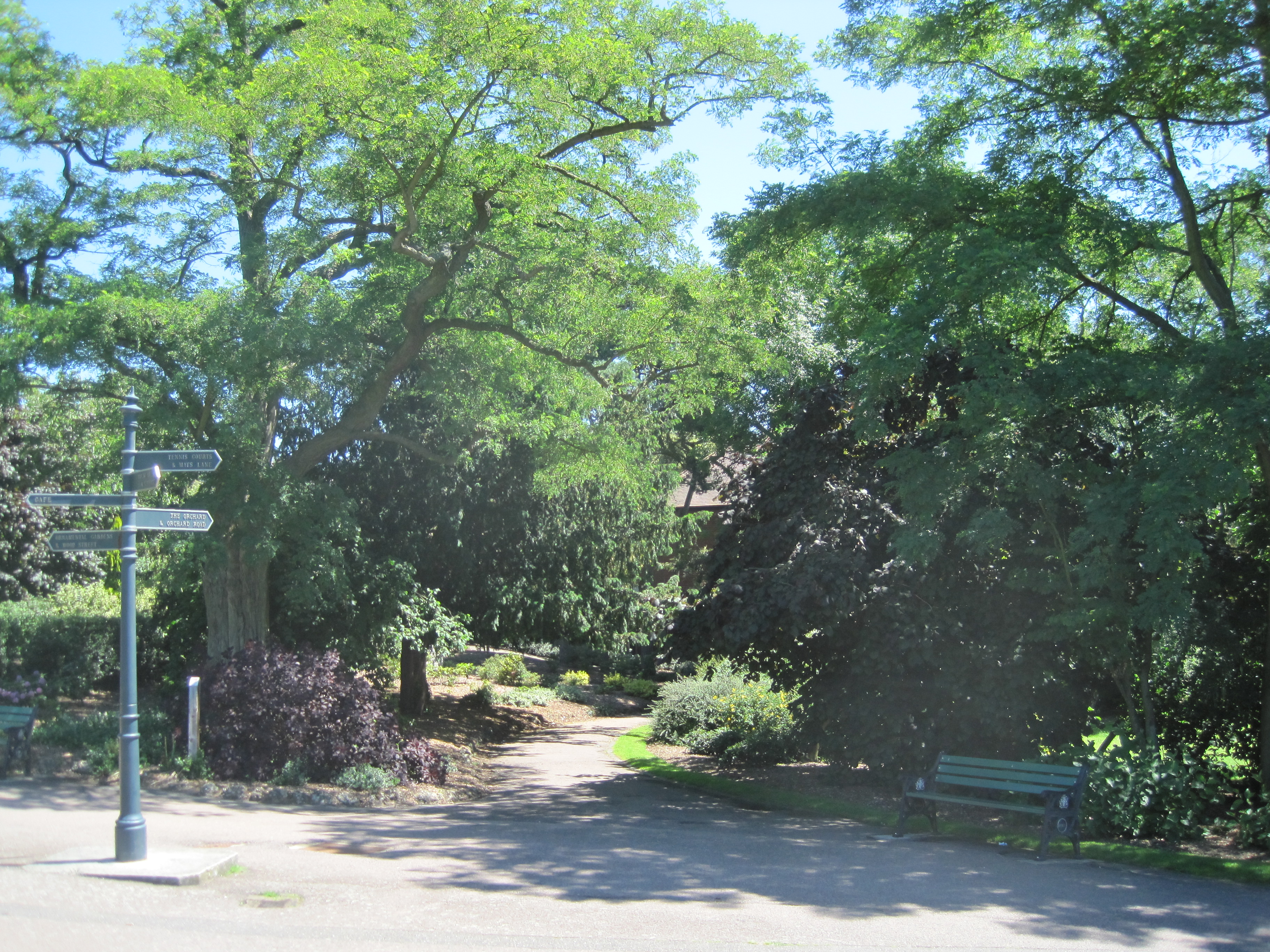
Junction

== See also ==
- Barnet parks and open spaces
