= Whitings Hill Open Space =

Public open space in Barnet, London, England

Coordinates: 51°38′39″N 0°13′16″W

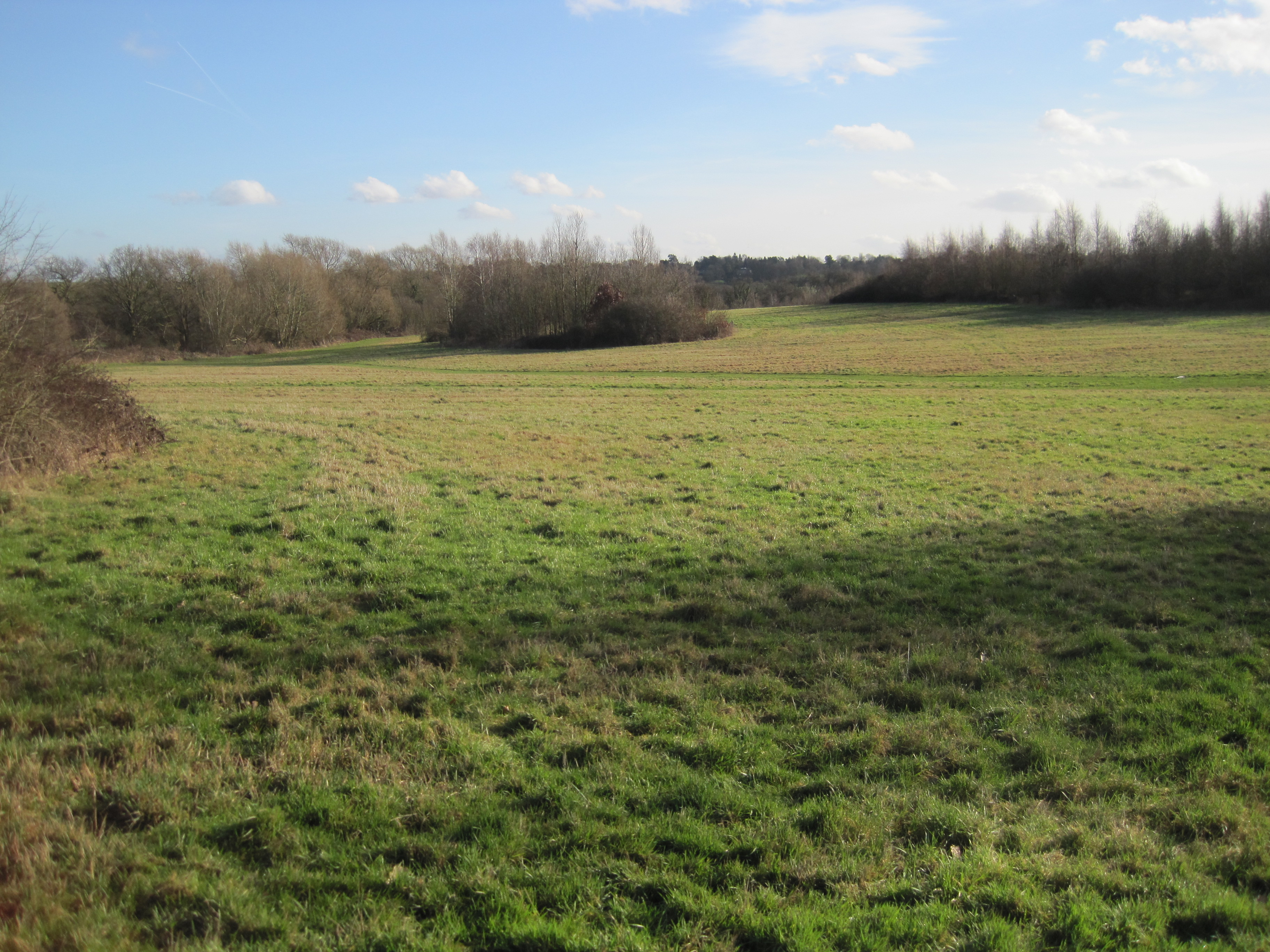
Whitings Hill Open Space

Whitings Hill Open Space is a large public open space in Chipping Barnet in the London Borough of Barnet.

It is mainly grassed with clumps of young trees, planted as part of the Watling Chase Community Forest, and a few mature trees. There are good views in all directions from the top of Whitings Hill. A small stream, a tributary of Dollis Brook, flows through the site.

There is access from Shelford Road, Quinta Drive, Brett Road and Hackforth Close.

== Whitings Wood ==
Whitings Wood is a seven hectare site adjacent to Whitings Hill Open Space on the south west side. It was planted with trees by the Woodland Trust on former grassland in 1996. It is mainly oak, ash, field maple and woody shrubs. There is access from Mays Lane and from the Open Space.

== Gallery ==
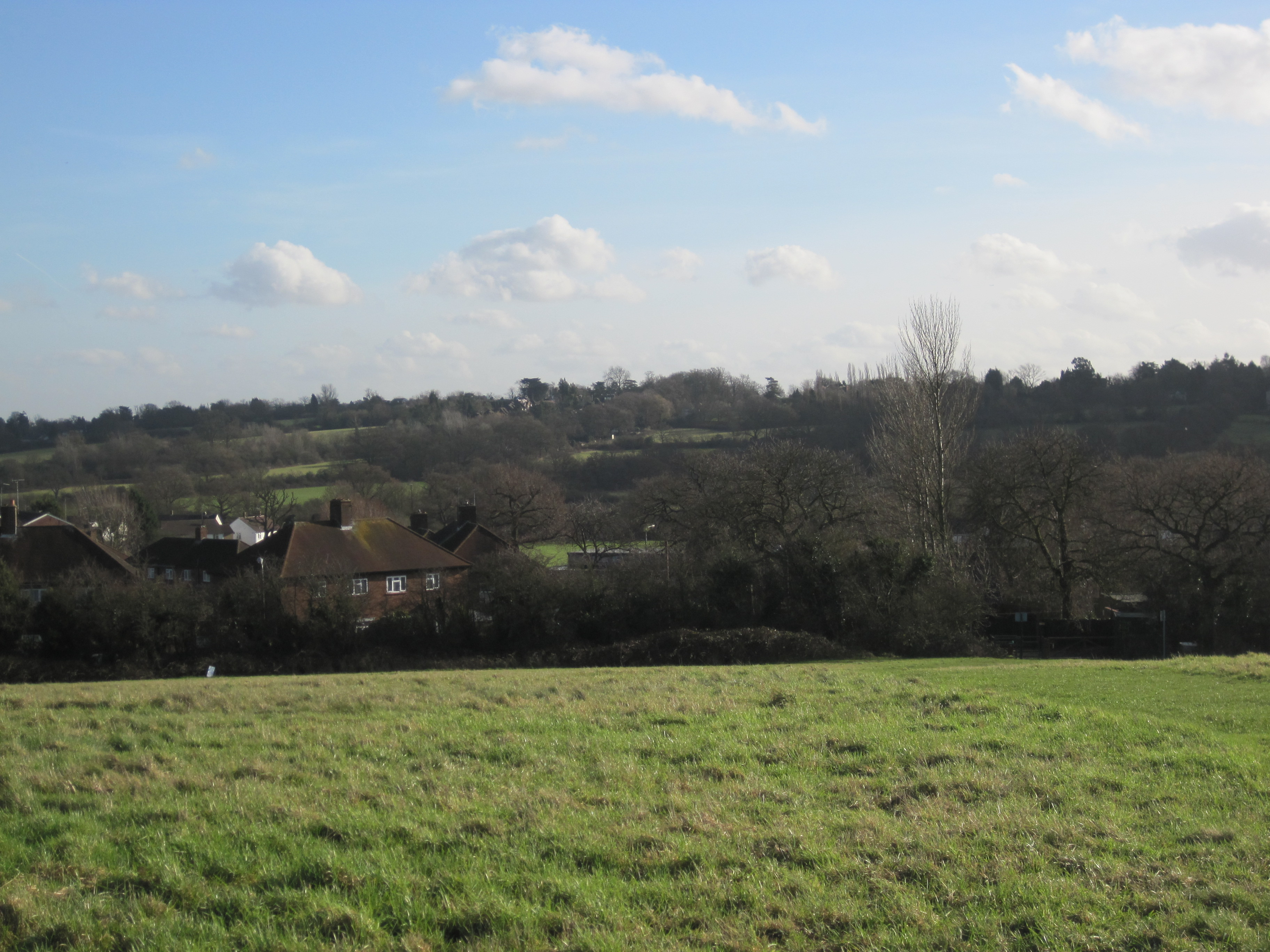
View from Whitings Hill

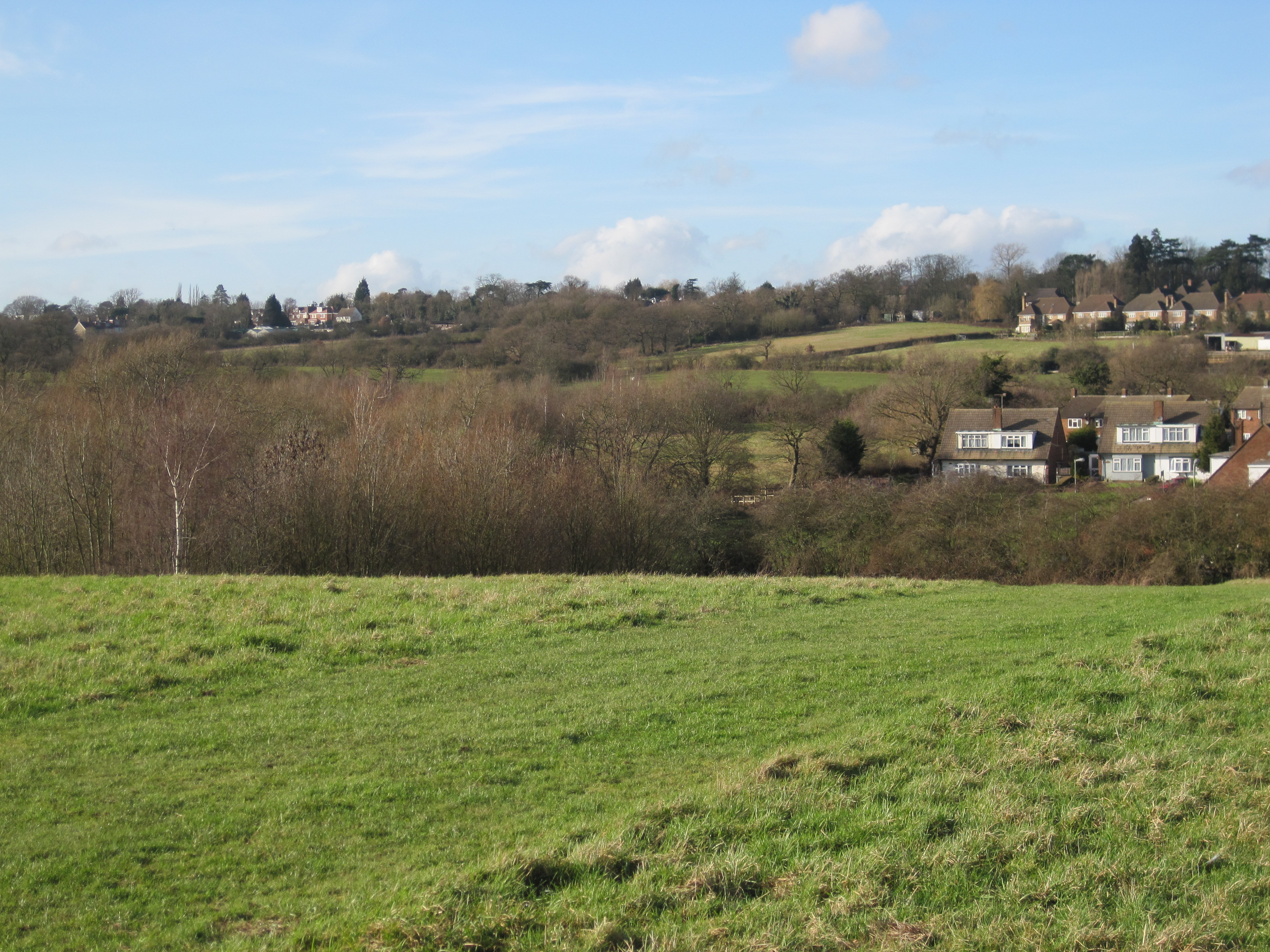
View from Whitings Hill

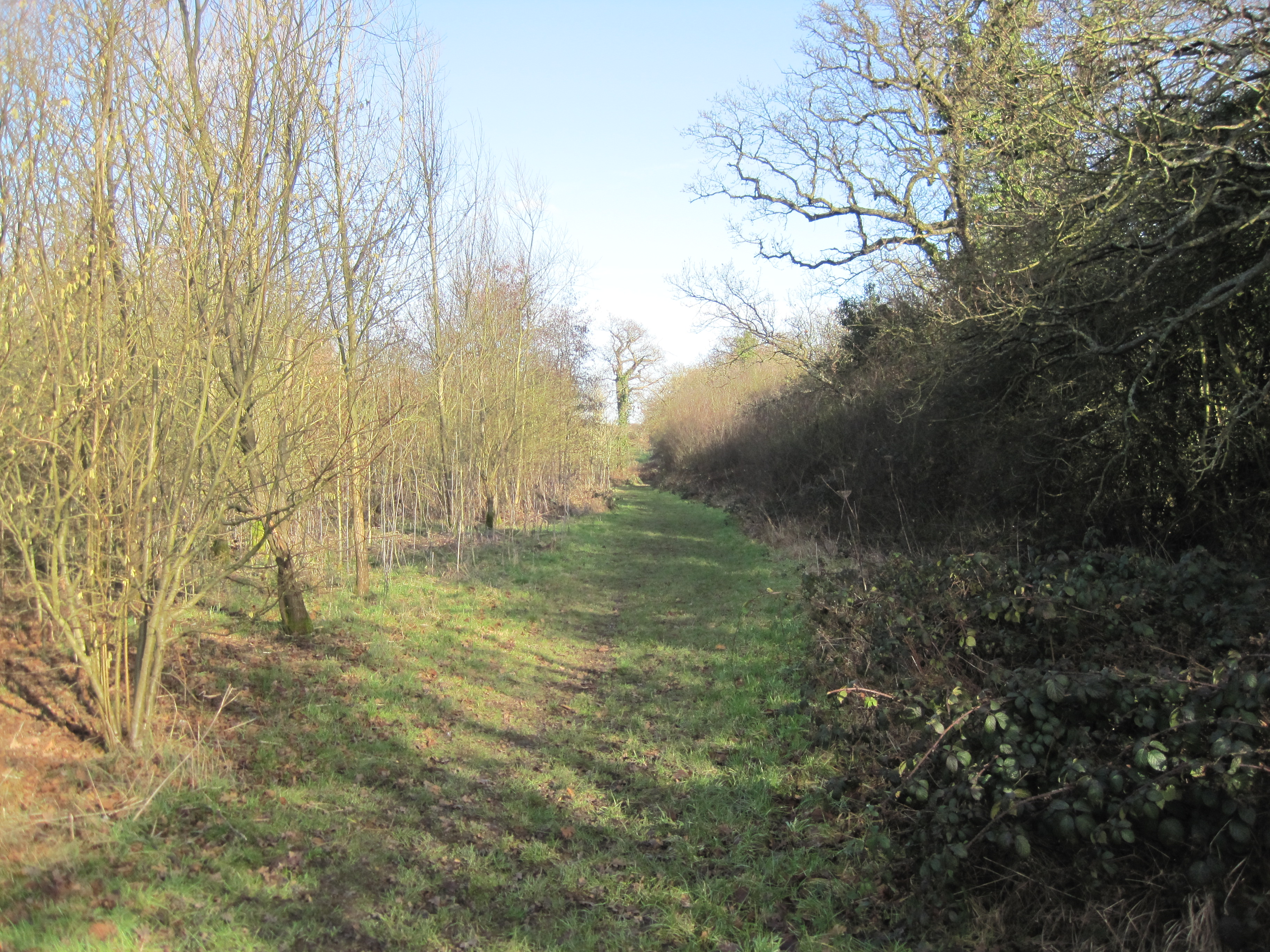
Whitings Wood

== See also ==
- Barnet parks and open spaces
