= Highlands Gardens =

Park in England

Coordinates: 51.6483°N 0.1864°W

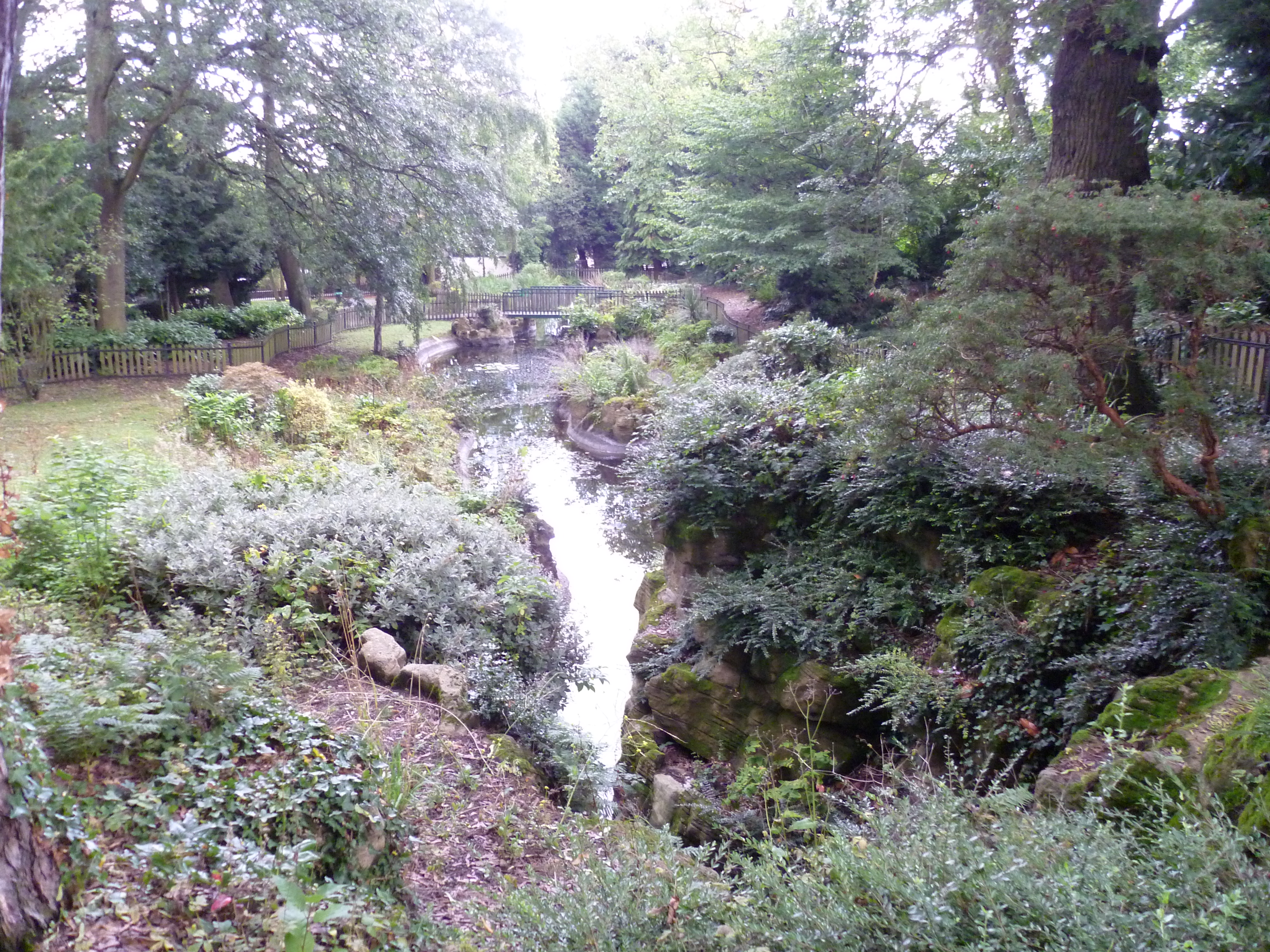
Rockworks at Highlands Gardens.

Highlands Gardens is a small park in New Barnet at the western end of Leicester Road, on the corner with Abbotts Road. The park was opened in 1931 in the grounds of Highlands House which was demolished in about 1972 and replaced by flats.

== The park ==
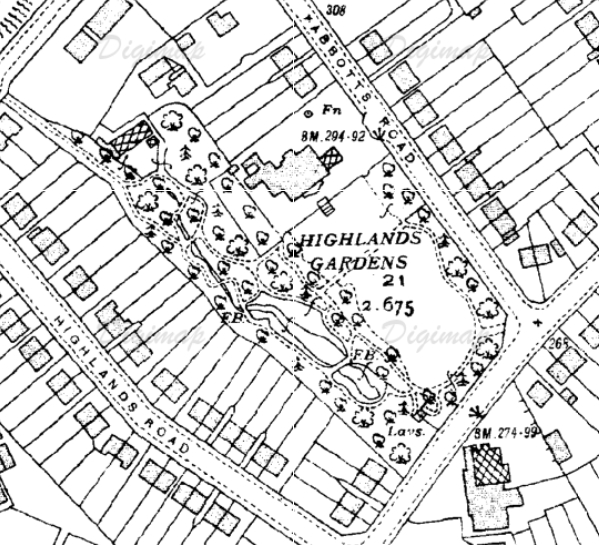
Highlands Gardens and house on a 1930s Ordnance Survey map.

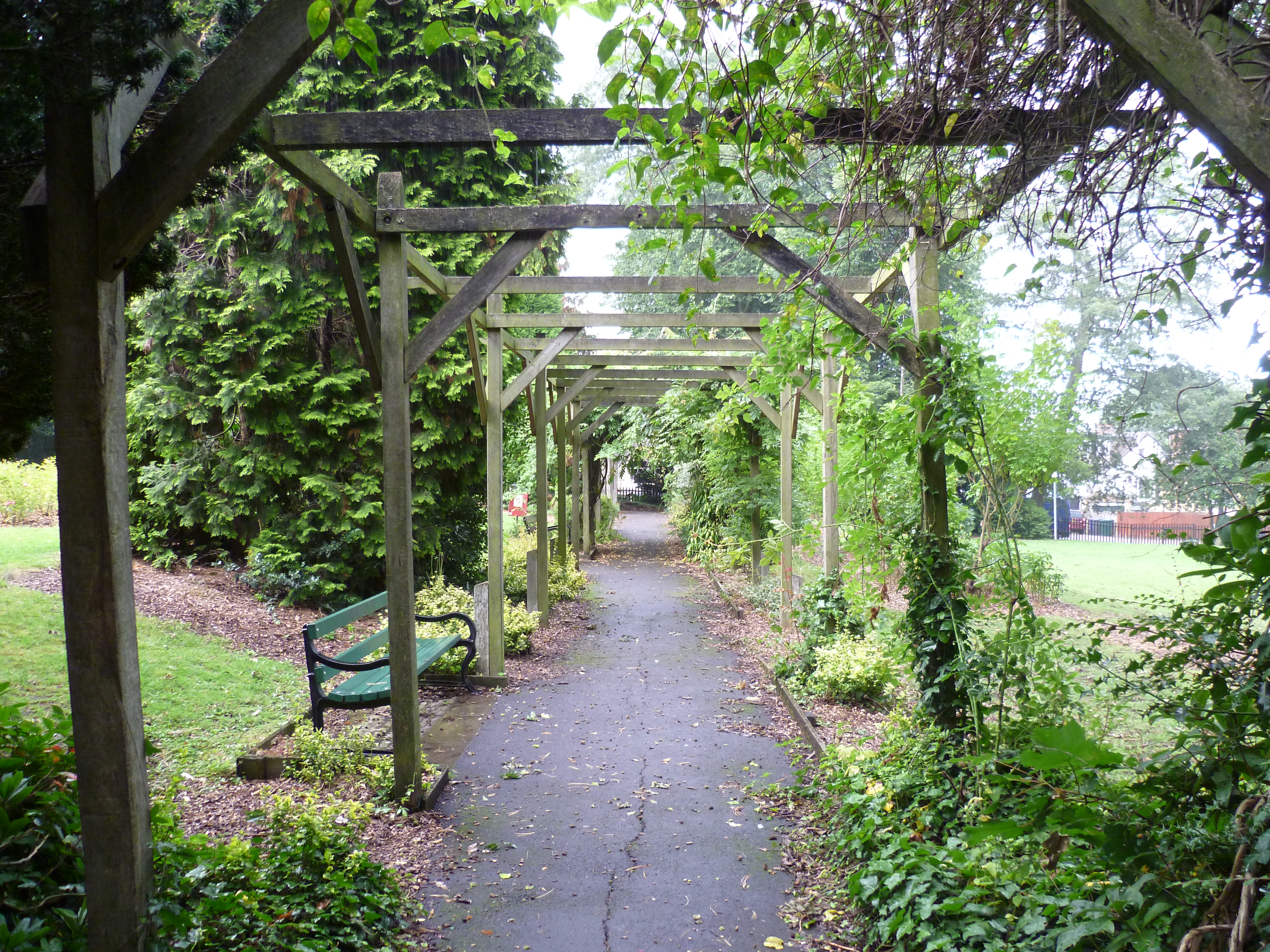
The pergola.

The park was opened in 1931 in the grounds of Highlands House which already had a well-established set of gardens. The entrance is on the corner of Leicester Road and Abbotts Road. The gardens consist of a lawn terrace with a pergola walk on the north side and water and rock features on the western side. All four sides of the gardens include mature trees. The rockworks were probably the work of James Pulham and Son, around 1871, of nearby Broxbourne. An aviary by the name of the "Bird World Display Centre" existed on the northern edge of the gardens until the late 1990s. The gardens are maintained by the London Borough of Barnet with help from the Friends of Highlands Gardens.

== Highlands House ==
Highlands House, c. 1960s, showing the domed observatory.

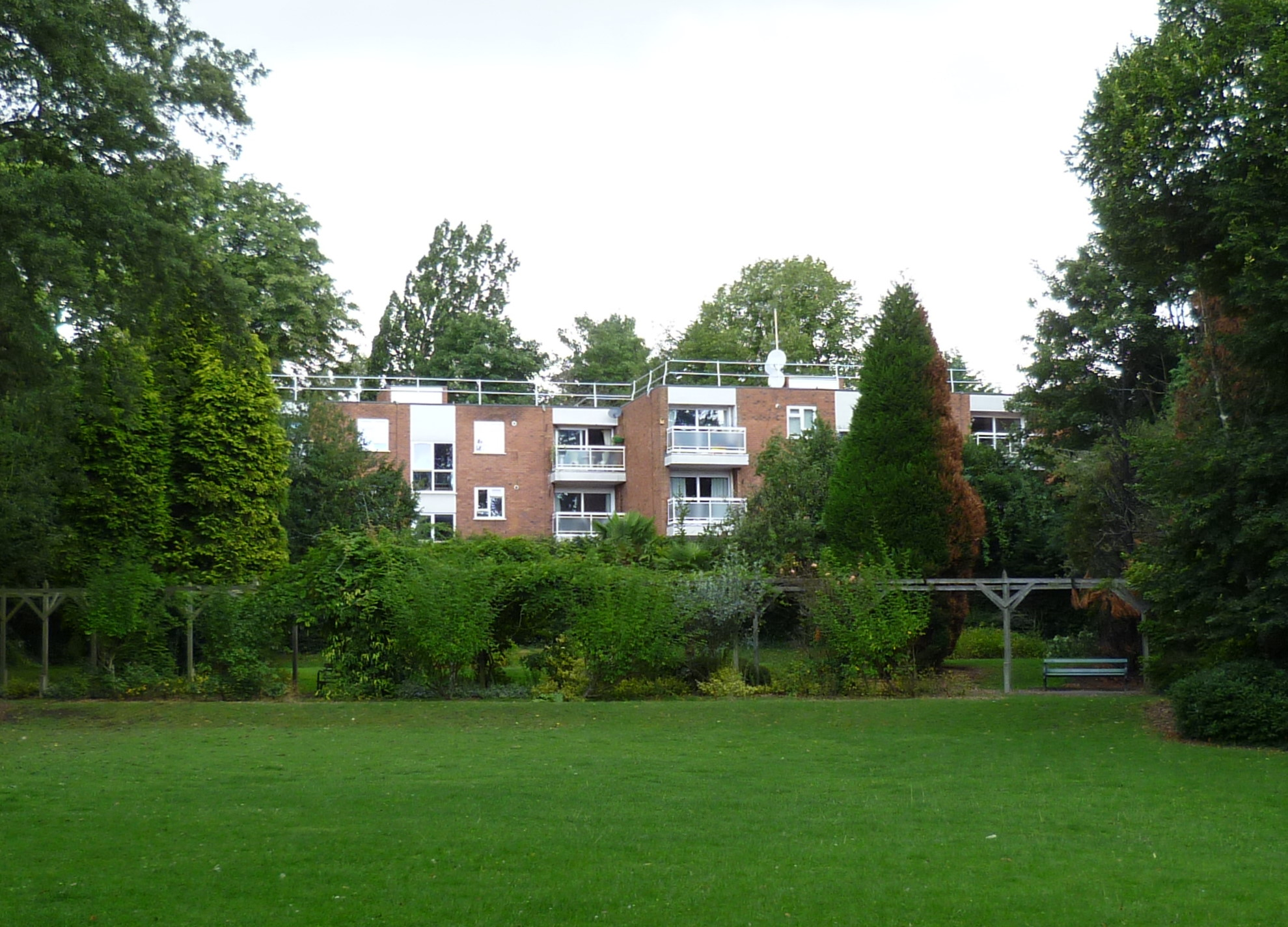
The Highlands flats that replaced Highlands House.

Highlands House was built in 1897 for the banker Joseph Bevan Braithwaite (1855-1934) who is thought to have designed the gardens. The house was south facing on high ground that overlooked Leicester Road, New Barnet. Braithwaite was an amateur astronomer who had a copper-domed observatory built at the house with a telescope on rails offering 360 degree views of the sky. During the Second World War, the dome was painted black in order to prevent it being visible to enemy aircraft in moonlight.

In 1930, George P. Howe bought the house, or part of it, and converted it to eight flats that he rented out. Around 1951, the house became a family home again after Howe allowed his married children and his grandchildren to live there. His daughter, Joan Cochrane, recalled:

"The windows were by Crittall, and some contained leaded lights; the staircase of oak; the ground floor parquet. Terrazzo flooring was in the foyer and on the terrace. The walls in the hall and on the upper two landings were panelled. This was a substantial house, with the roof fully lined with wood beneath the tiles and the lofts boarded. There were several immense cellars linked by hatches and one of them contained a huge boiler which provided hot air to the ground floor via brass gratings in the parquet flooring. Drains and sewers were lined with glazed white tiles."

By 1972 the house had deteriorated and it was demolished, eventually being replaced by a block of flats known as The Highlands.
