= Kitty da Costa =

18th century breach of contract defendant

- Born: Catherine Rachel da Costa; 1710; London
- Died: 19 March 1747 (aged 36–37); Blyth, Nottinghamshire
- Other names: Catherine da Costa, Catherine (Kitty) Villareal, Catherine Da Costa Villa Real, Kitty da Costa Villareal, Catherine (Kitty) Mellish
- Spouse(s): Joseph Isaac Villareal, William Mellish
- Children: 4 including Charles Mellish
- Parent(s): Leonora Sara Mendes, Joseph da Costa

Kitty da Costa (born Catherine Rachel da Costa; 1710–1747), also known by the names Kitty Villareal and Kitty Mellish after her marriages, was an English Sephardi Jew who converted to Christianity. She was sued by her suitor and first cousin Philip Jacob Mendes da Costa for breach of contract, in a court case which caused controversy at the time. She had four children, three of whom survived into adulthood.

== Early life ==
Catherine (Kitty) Rachel da Costa was born in London in 1710 to Joseph da Costa and Leonora Sara Mendes. Her father was a wealthy Sephardi Jew who traded in gold and coral. In 1690, there were approximately 800 Sephardis in England and by 1720 there were 1,000; most had moved in order to avoid the Spanish Inquisition. Kitty da Costa lived on Budge Row in the City of London and at the family's country retreat, the Manor of Copped Hall in Totteridge, Hertfordshire. The Budge Row house belonged to her grandfather until his death in 1716, whereupon it was inherited by her father.

== Life ==
Around 1724, the possibility of marriage between Kitty da Costa and her first cousin Philip Jacob Mendes da Costa was raised; however, her parents forbade the match. In 1727, she was instead married to Joseph Isaac Villareal, the son of the comptroller of the Portuguese Army, who had been forced to flee Lisbon after being accused of Judaizing. She was almost 17 and he was 54. The couple had two children, Sarah (born 1728) and Abraham (born 1729), then Joseph Villareal died on 27 December 1730. Earlier that year in April, Villareal had altered his will to make his wife and children the sole heirs; this meant that Kitty da Costa Villareal became a rich young widow.

Kitty da Costa Villareal spent winters at Budge Row, living there with her eight servants. She also had a house of her own at College Hill in London. Her confidante Anna Webb claimed that on 18 January 1731 (just three weeks after the death of her husband), Kitty da Costa Villareal had invited her former suitor Philip Jacob Mendes da Costa for breakfast, telling him they should be married after the mourning period and giving him a kiss. Kitty and Philip exchanged passionate letters and attempted to elope, but her father would not permit the marriage. Angered, Philip da Costa decided to sue Kitty da Costa for breach of promise at the Arches Court in 1732 (De Costa v. Villareal), arguing that a contract had been broken and he was entitled to damages of £100,000 (equivalent to £22,000,000 in 2023). The case caused a scandal at the time. Evidence was not heard in court but affidavits were supplied. On 25 June 1733, Doctor Bettesworth handed down the judgement that Philip was not entitled to damages since even if Kitty had wanted to marry, her father's agreement had not been given. Philip da Costa then published his score-settling account of what had happened under the pseudonym Philalethes as The proceedings at large in the Arches Court of Canterbury, between Mr. Jacob Mendes Da Costa, and Mrs. Catherine Da Costa Villa Real: Both of the Jewish religion and cousin Germans, relating to a marriage contract. Having failed in the ecclesiastical court, Philip da Costa claimed for the same damages at the Court of King's Bench, only to lose again. Lord Chief Justice Hardwicke threw the case out without hearing any evidence and Philip da Costa had to pay £180 in costs (equivalent to £39,000 in 2023).

In 1735, Kitty da Costa married for a second time, to William Mellish. She then converted to Christianity and had two more children, Joseph (died as an infant) and Charles Mellish (born 1737). Her children from her first marriage were living with her father, and after another legal battle (Villareal v. Mellish), she regained custody of them. It helped her case that she was now Christian and followed the religion of the land. Hardwicke, now Lord Chancellor, commented that he gave judgement with reluctance but there was no reason to keep the children away from their mother. They were subsequently baptised in April 1738 at St Anne's Church, Soho, with Sarah becoming Elizabeth and Abraham becoming William. Elizabeth later married William Monckton-Arundell, who became 2nd Viscount Galway, making her Lady Galway; she was the first peer to have been born Jewish.

The Mellishes lived in Nottinghamshire. William Mellish used his wife's money to become a Member of Parliament for East Retford in 1741. Kitty Mellish died on 19 March 1747 in Blyth, Nottinghamshire. She left her entire estate to her husband.
