= Woodridge Nature Reserve =

Nature reserve in London, England

Coordinates: 51.6227°N 0.1955°W

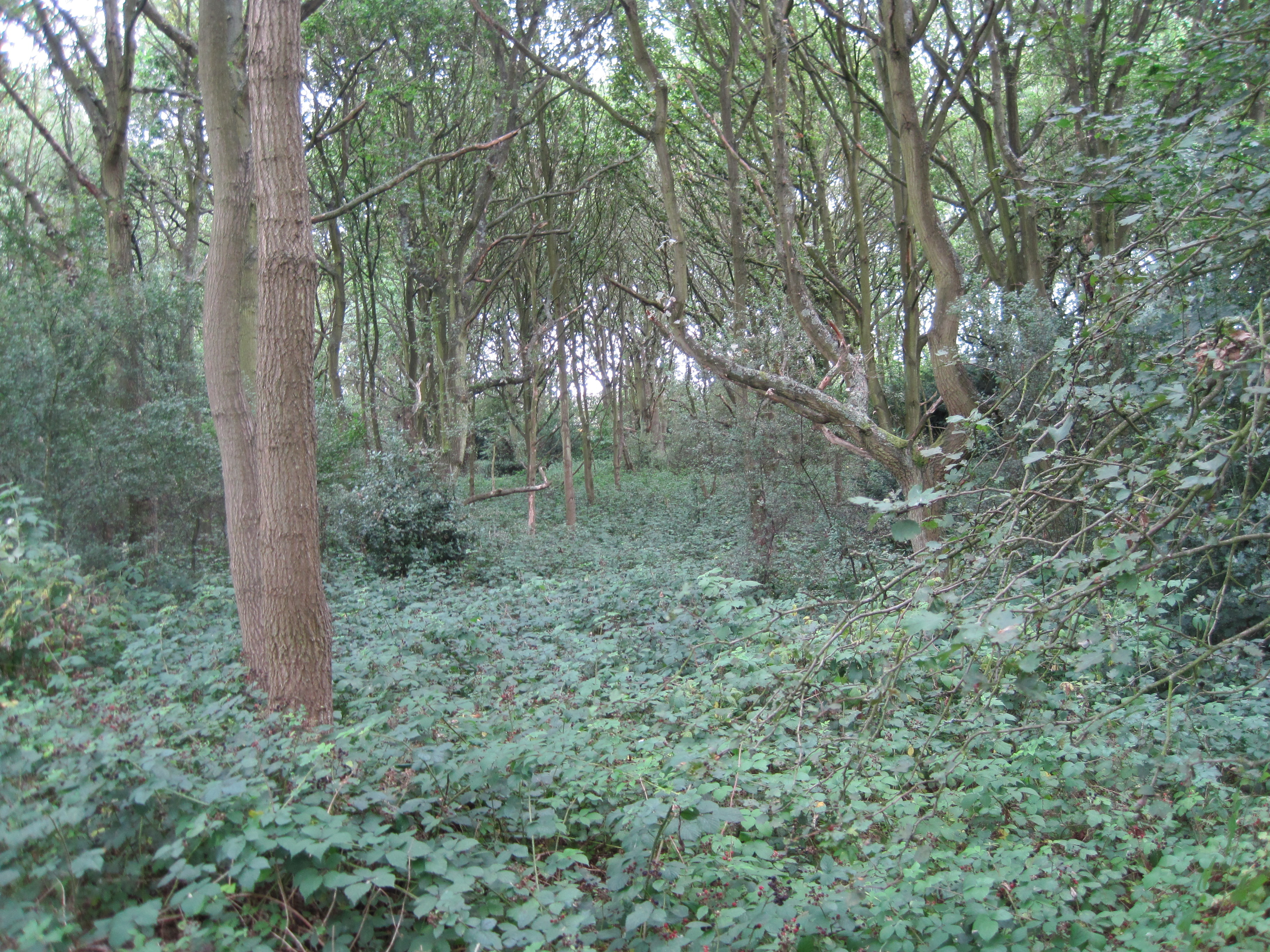
Woodridge Nature Reserve

Woodridge Nature Reserve or Woodridge School Nature Reserve is a 0.7-hectare (1.7-acre) Site of Local Importance for Nature Conservation in Woodside Park, London, owned and managed by the London Borough of Barnet. It was designed as a nature trail for local primary schools, but is now very neglected.

It lies predominantly on London clay, and comprises oak woodland and grassland. It was originally farmed as pasture, and is a haven for wildlife such as woodland birds, insects and amphibians.

The reserve is close to Folly Brook in Folly Brook Valley, a large area of woods and grassland which is public open space between Woodside Park and Totteridge. Access is by a kissing gate in a pasture area close to the Michleham Down entrance to the Valley.

== See also ==
- Barnet parks and open spaces
- Nature reserves in Barnet
