= Totteridge Green =

Nature reserve in Totteridge, London, England

Coordinates: 51.6281°N 0.1953°W

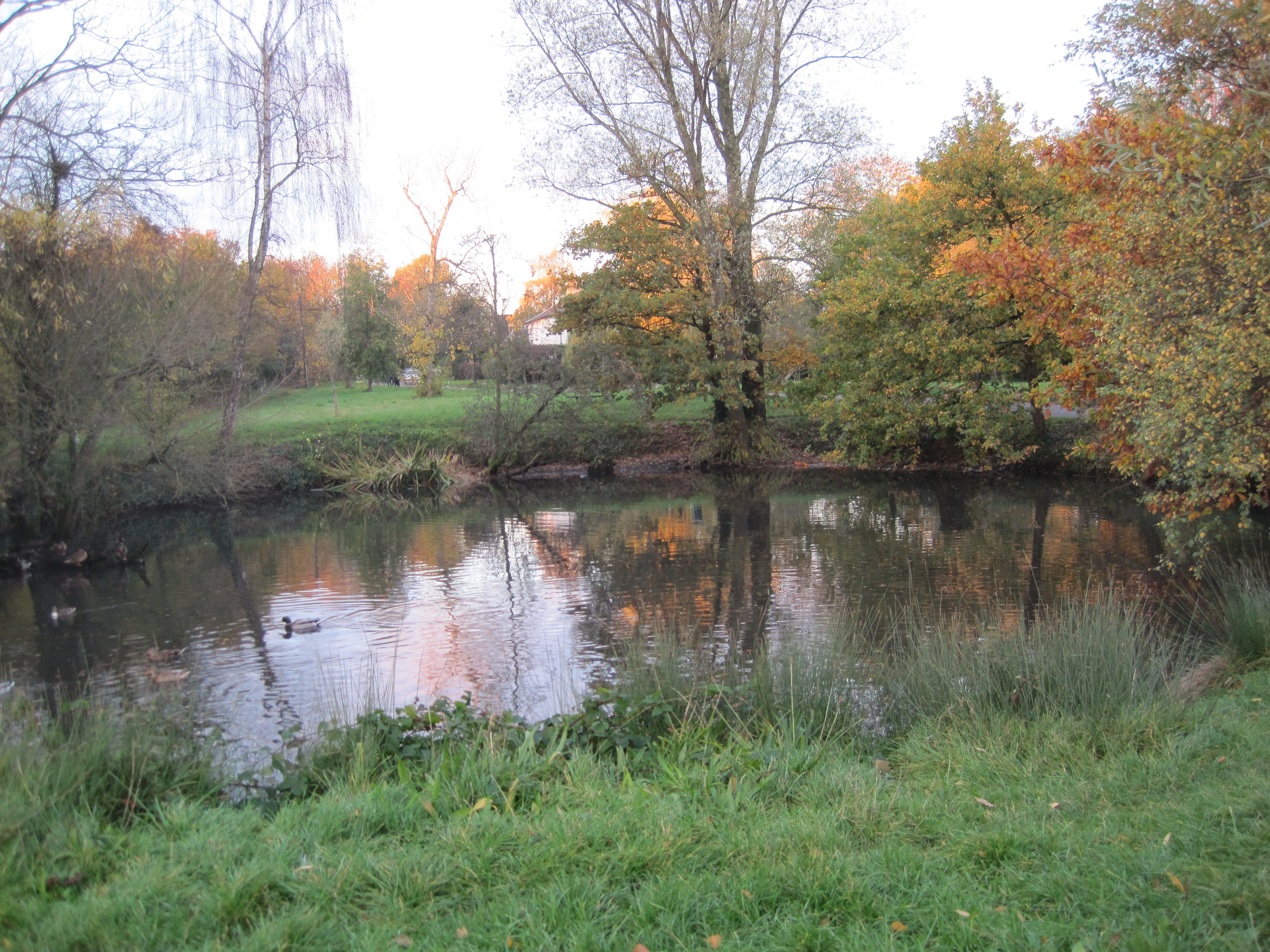
Laurel Farm Pond, Totteridge Green

Totteridge Green is a five hectare Site of Borough Importance for Nature Conservation, Grade II, in Totteridge in the London Borough of Barnet. It is also registered common land.

The nature reserve is the land on both sides of the road, Totteridge Green. A typical English village green, it comprises open grassland, small pockets of scrubby woodland and a pond.

Much of the grassland is dominated by perennial rye-grass, with a good diversity of common wild flowers, and there are also areas of dry acid grassland. Several damp hollows, probably former ponds, contain tussocky grassland with uncommon wild flowers such as great burnet, bog stitchwort and common marsh-bedstraw. A map of the 1840s shows fourteen ponds, but only Laurel Farm Pond survives. This is frequented by large numbers of geese and mallards. Trees include pedunculate oak, beech and horse chestnut.

The site includes a short footpath through woods to Coppice Walk, and there is also access from Totteridge Village and Laurel Way. A footpath which starts next to Laurel Farm Pond goes through Folly Brook Valley to Woodside Park.

== Totteridge Croft Field (or Dell's Down Acre) ==
Totteridge Croft Field is a 2.4-hectare (5.9-acre) Site of Borough Importance for Nature Conservation, Grade I, between Totteridge Green and Darland's Lake at Grid Ref TQ248 934. It was a field bounded by tall unmanaged hedges on unimproved clay grassland. It appears to have been a hay meadow in the past which reverted to rough grassland and scrub. Much of the field was covered with tufted hair-grass, and it had scattered oak and crab apple trees and a good variety of wild flowers. There were some uncommon species, such as sneezewort and pignut. The field provided a good habitat for birds and cover for mammals such as rabbits and muntjac. It was private land with no public access.

As of March 2024 it is publicly accessibly woodland and scrub crossed by footpaths. It is between Folly Brook and a track leading south from Totteridge Green.

== Gallery ==
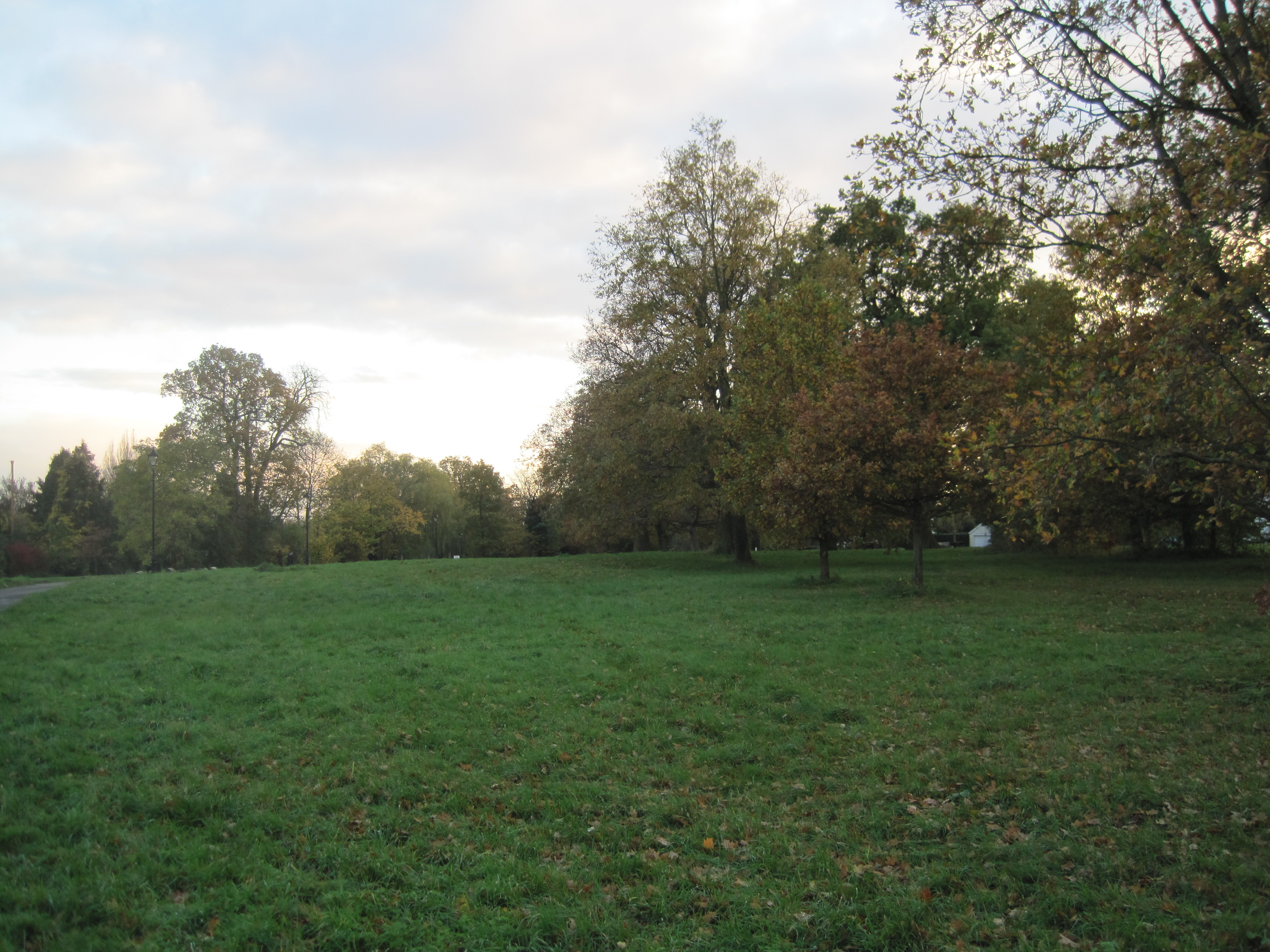
Totteridge Green

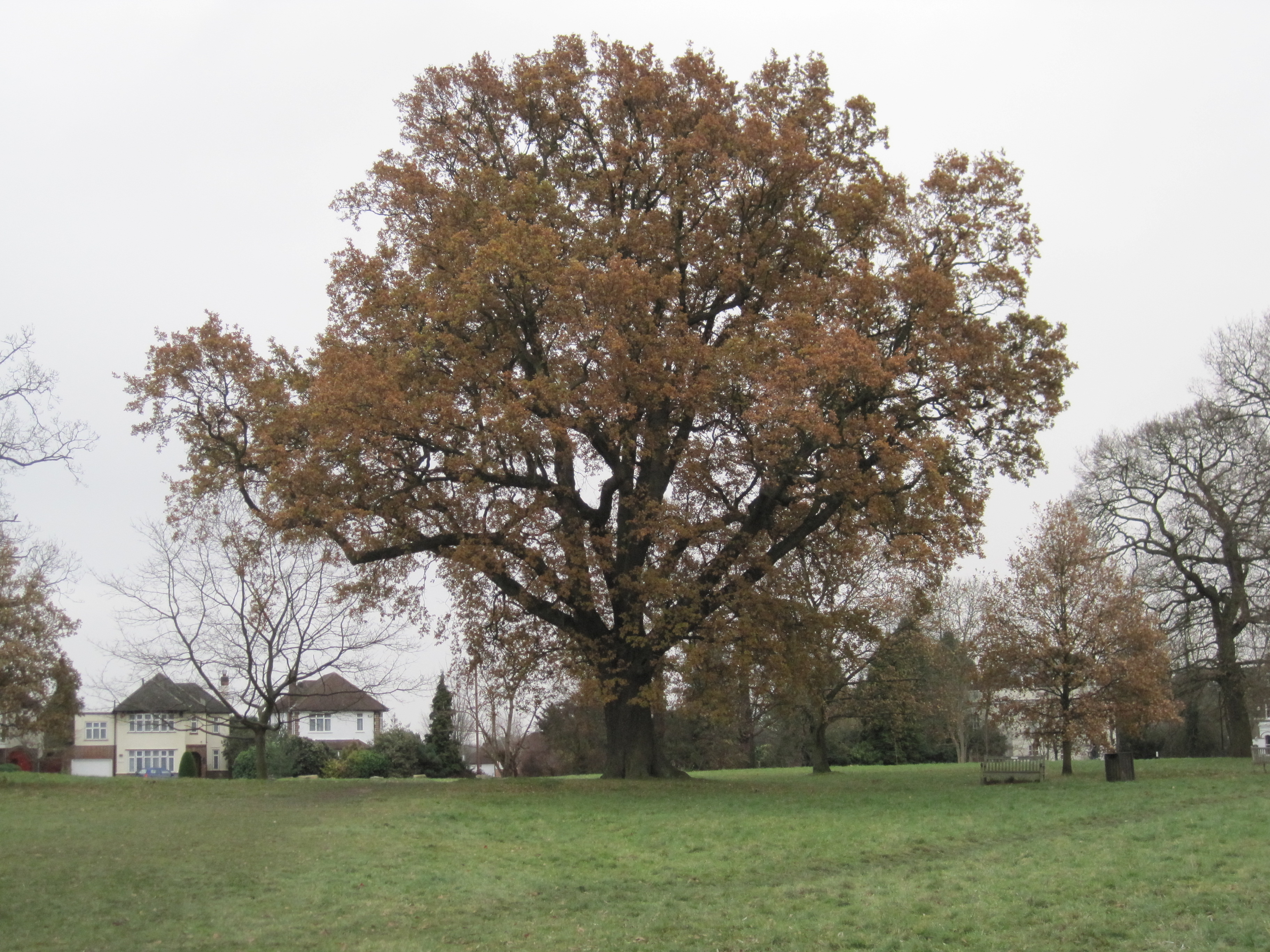
Oak tree on Totteridge Green

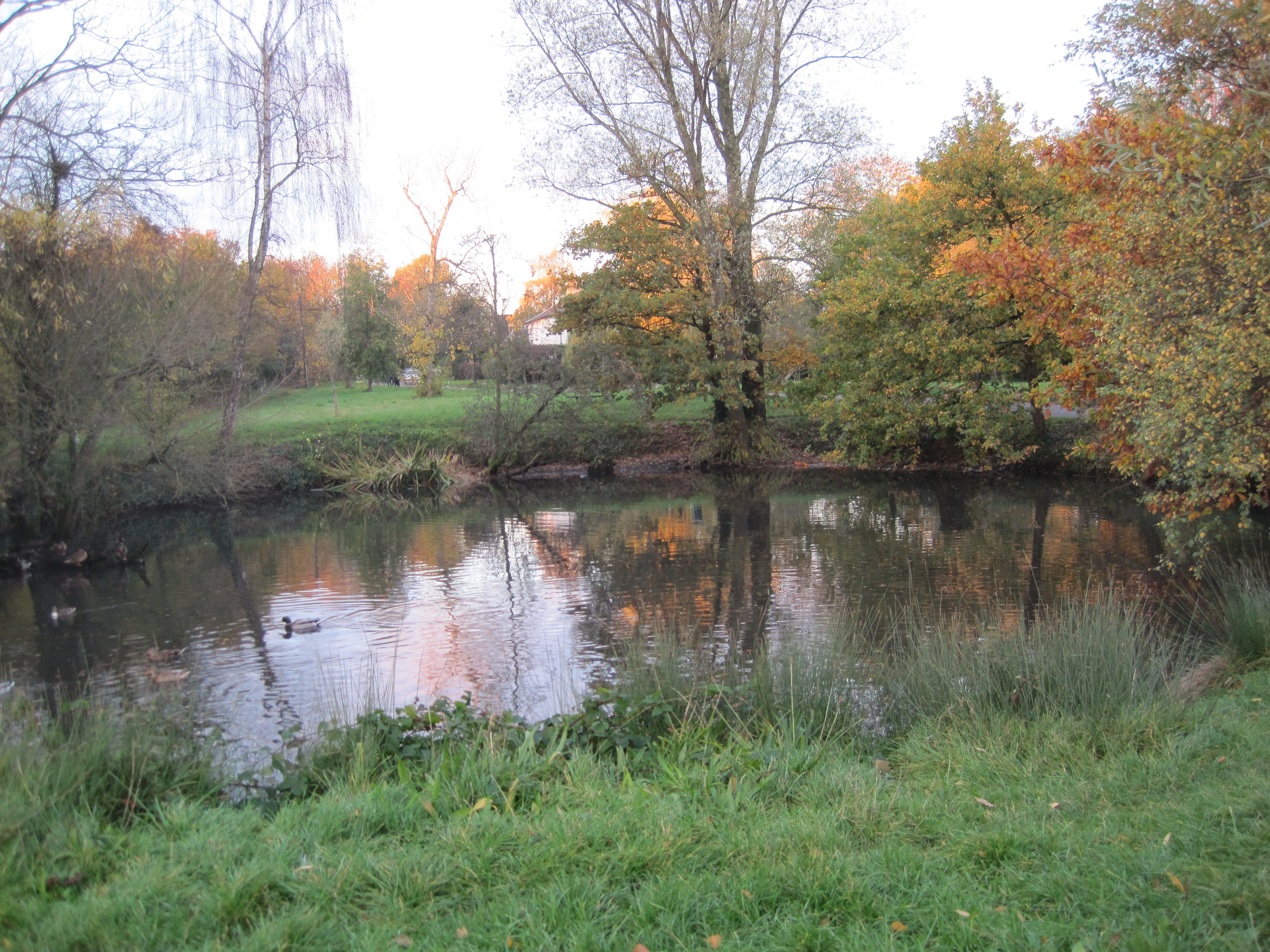
Laurel Farm Pond

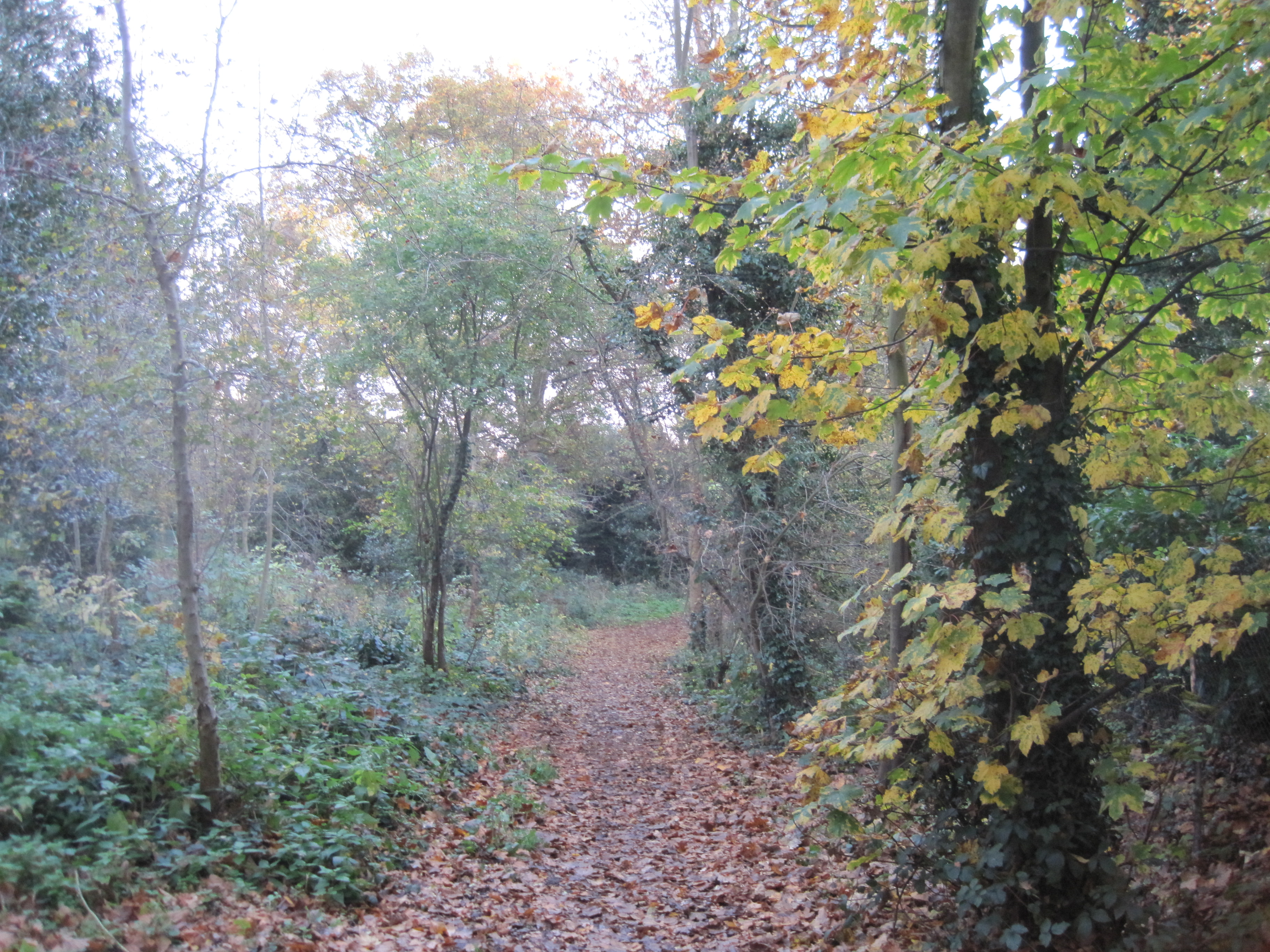
Footpath to Coppice Walk

== See also ==
- Nature reserves in Barnet
