= Chipping Barnet (constituency) =

UK Parliament constituency (since 1974)

Coordinates: 51.640°N 0.194°W

- Borough constituency for the House of Commons
- Interactive map of boundaries from 2024
- Boundary within Greater London
- County: Greater London
- Population: 111,973 (2011 census)
- Electorate: 78,038 (2024 general election)
- Major settlements: High Barnet/Chipping Barnet, Whetstone, New Barnet, East Barnet, Totteridge, Arkley, Brunswick Park

Current constituency
- Created: 1974
- Member of Parliament: Dan Tomlinson (Labour Party)
- Seats: One
- Created from: Barnet

Chipping Barnet is a constituency (Note: A borough constituency (for the purposes of election expenses and type of returning officer).) created in 1974 and represented in the House of Commons of the UK Parliament since 2024 by Dan Tomlinson of the Labour Party. (Note: As with all constituencies, the constituency elects one Member of Parliament (MP) by the first past the post system of election at least every five years.) It is part of the London Borough of Barnet, on the border with Hertfordshire.

== Constituency profile ==
The Chipping Barnet constituency is located on the outskirts of Greater London within the Borough of Barnet. The area was traditionally part of Hertfordshire and consisted of the agricultural market town of Chipping Barnet (often shortened to simply Barnet). Today the area is well-connected to central London by the Northern line of the London Underground and is predominantly commuter suburbia. The constituency also includes the neighbourhood of Whetstone and part of Edgware, which is separated from Barnet by a rural area. The constituency is predominantly affluent, particularly in Barnet and parts of Brunswick Park. House prices are higher than the rest of London and more than double the national average.

Residents of the constituency are generally older than the rest of London and, compared to national averages, have high levels of income, education and professional employment. The constituency is ethnically diverse; 45% of residents are White British, 15% Other White, 17% Asian and 6% Black. There is a large Jewish community (10%) concentrated in Edgware. At the local borough council, Barnet and the residential areas to its east are represented by Labour Party councillors, whilst the more rural areas around Edgware, Totteridge and Woodside Park elected Conservatives. Voters in the constituency were generally supportive of remaining in the European Union in the 2016 referendum; an estimated 60% voted to remain compared to 48% nationwide.

== Boundaries ==
=== Historic ===
The seat was created from the parts of the former Barnet constituency which were in the London Borough of Barnet.

1974–1997: The London Borough of Barnet wards of Arkley, Brunswick Park, East Barnet, Hadley, and Totteridge.

1997–2010: As above plus Friern Barnet.

2010–2024: The London Borough of Barnet wards of Brunswick Park, Coppetts, East Barnet, High Barnet, Oakleigh, Totteridge, and Underhill.

=== Current ===
Further to the 2023 review of Westminster constituencies, which came into effect for the 2024 general election, the constituency is composed of:

- The London Borough of Barnet wards of Barnet Vale, Brunswick Park, East Barnet, Edgwarebury, High Barnet, Totteridge and Woodside, Underhill and Whetstone.

The new boundaries reflect the local authority boundary review which came into effect in May 2022. The community of Friern Barnet was moved to the new constituency of Hornsey and Friern Barnet; to compensate, the Edgewarebury ward was transferred in from Hendon.

== Members of Parliament ==
Election	Member	Party
1974	Reginald Maudling	Conservative
1979	Sydney Chapman	Conservative
2005	Theresa Villiers	Conservative
2024	Dan Tomlinson	Labour

== History ==
The seat was held by a Conservative after its creation for the February 1974 general election, and withstood the Labour landslide in 1997 by just over 2% (1,035 votes). However, this would come to a close after the 2024 general election, when Chipping Barnet was won by the Labour Party; it was the first time in the constituency's history that it was not represented by a Conservative MP.

At the 2019 general election, the seat was seen as an important potential gain for the Labour Party, due to Theresa Villiers' small majority and high-profile (as the Environment Secretary), in addition to the seat's vote to remain in the 2016 European Union membership referendum. Nevertheless, Villiers retained the seat with a majority increased threefold, albeit still a small one. Villiers finally lost her seat at the 2024 election to Labour's Dan Tomlinson, the first Labour MP to represent the constituency, and the area, in Parliament since 1945.

== Elections ==
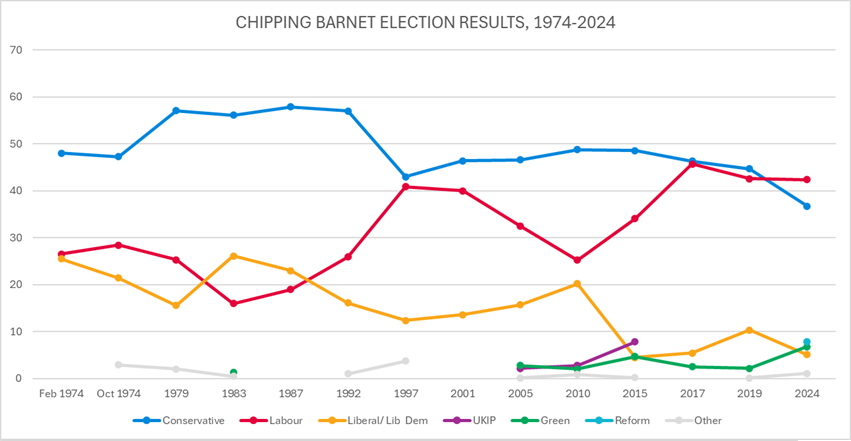
Election results 1974–2024

=== Elections in the 2020s ===
General election 2024: Chipping Barnet
Party	Candidate	Votes	%	±%
Labour	Dan Tomlinson	21,585	42.4	+2.1
Conservative	Theresa Villiers	18,671	36.7	−10.8
Reform	Hamish Haddow	3,986	7.8	N/A
Green	David Farbey	3,442	6.8	+4.6
Liberal Democrats	Mark Durrant	2,614	5.1	−4.7
Rejoin EU	Richard Hewison	379	0.7	N/A
Independent	Kay Lauer	182	0.4	N/A
Majority		2,914	5.7	
Turnout		50,859	65.2	−11.50
Registered electors		78,038		
Labour gain from Conservative		Swing	+6.5	

=== Elections in the 2010s ===
2019 notional result
Party	Vote	%
Conservative	27,777	47.5
Labour	23,568	40.3
Liberal Democrats	5,745	9.8
Green	1,261	2.2
Others	71	0.1
Turnout	58,422	76.7
Electorate	76,187	

General election 2019: Chipping Barnet
Party	Candidate	Votes	%	±%
Conservative	Theresa Villiers	25,745	44.7	−1.6
Labour	Emma Whysall	24,533	42.6	−3.1
Liberal Democrats	Isabelle Parasram	5,932	10.3	+4.9
Green	Gabrielle Bailey	1,288	2.2	−0.3
Advance	John Sheffield	71	0.1	N/A
Majority		1,212	2.1	+1.5
Turnout		57,569	72.0	+0.2
Registered electors		79,960		
Conservative hold		Swing	+0.7	

General election 2017: Chipping Barnet
Party	Candidate	Votes	%	±%
Conservative	Theresa Villiers	25,679	46.3	−2.3
Labour	Emma Whysall	25,326	45.7	+11.6
Liberal Democrats	Marisha Ray	3,012	5.4	+0.9
Green	Phil Fletcher	1,406	2.5	−2.2
Majority		353	0.6	−13.9
Turnout		55,423	71.8	+3.7
Registered electors		77,218		
Conservative hold		Swing	−6.9	

General election 2015: Chipping Barnet
Party	Candidate	Votes	%	±%
Conservative	Theresa Villiers	25,759	48.6	−0.2
Labour	Amy Trevethan	18,103	34.1	+8.9
UKIP	Victor Kaye	4,151	7.8	+5.0
Green	Audrey Poppy	2,501	4.7	+2.7
Liberal Democrats	Marisha Ray	2,381	4.5	−15.7
Independent	Mehdi Akhavan	118	0.2	N/A
Majority		7,656	14.5	−9.1
Turnout		53,013	68.1	+3.0
Registered electors		77,807		
Conservative hold		Swing	−4.5	

General election 2010: Chipping Barnet
Party	Candidate	Votes	%	±%
Conservative	Theresa Villiers	24,700	48.8	+2.9
Labour	Damien Welfare	12,773	25.2	−8.6
Liberal Democrats	Stephen Barber	10,202	20.2	+4.9
UKIP	James Fluss	1,442	2.8	+0.8
Green	Kate Tansley	1,021	2.0	−0.8
Independent	Philip Clayton	470	0.9	N/A
Majority		11,927	23.6	+9.5
Turnout		50,608	65.1	+2.3
Registered electors		75,120		
Conservative hold		Swing	+5.77	

=== Elections in the 2000s ===
General election 2005: Chipping Barnet
Party	Candidate	Votes	%	±%
Conservative	Theresa Villiers	19,744	46.6	+0.2
Labour	Pauline A. Coakley-Webb	13,784	32.5	−7.5
Liberal Democrats	Sean Hooker	6,671	15.7	+2.1
Green	Audrey M. Poppy	1,199	2.8	N/A
UKIP	Victor Kaye	924	2.2	N/A
Rainbow Dream Ticket	Rainbow George Weiss	59	0.1	N/A
Majority		5,960	14.1	+7.7
Turnout		42,381	64.1	+3.7
Registered electors		66,222		
Conservative hold		Swing	+3.8	

General election 2001: Chipping Barnet
Party	Candidate	Votes	%	±%
Conservative	Sydney Chapman	19,702	46.4	+3.4
Labour	Damien Welfare	17,001	40.0	−0.9
Liberal Democrats	Sean Hooker	5,753	13.6	+1.2
Majority		2,701	6.4	+4.3
Turnout		42,456	60.4	−11.3
Registered electors		70,239		
Conservative hold		Swing	+2.2	

=== Elections in the 1990s ===
General election 1997: Chipping Barnet
Party	Candidate	Votes	%	±%
Conservative	Sydney Chapman	21,317	43.0	−14.0
Labour	Geoff N. Cooke	20,282	40.9	+15.0
Liberal Democrats	Sean Hooker	6,121	12.4	−3.7
Referendum	Victor G. Ribekow	1,190	2.4	N/A
Monster Raving Loony	Brian L. Miskin	253	0.5	N/A
ProLife Alliance	Brian D. Scallan	243	0.5	N/A
Natural Law	Diane Derksen	159	0.3	−0.2
Majority		1,035	2.1	−29.0
Turnout		49,565	71.7	−6.9
Registered electors		69,088		
Conservative hold		Swing	−14.5	

General election 1992: Chipping Barnet
Party	Candidate	Votes	%	±%
Conservative	Sydney Chapman	25,589	57.0	−0.9
Labour	Alan J. Williams	11,638	25.9	+6.9
Liberal Democrats	David H. Smith	7,247	16.1	−6.9
Natural Law	Diane Derksen	222	0.5	N/A
Funstermentalist	Christopher V. Johnson	213	0.5	N/A
Majority		13,951	31.1	−3.8
Turnout		44,909	78.6	+8.6
Registered electors		57,153		
Conservative hold		Swing		

=== Elections in the 1980s ===
General election 1987: Chipping Barnet
Party	Candidate	Votes	%	±%
Conservative	Sydney Chapman	24,686	57.9	+1.8
Liberal	James Skinner	9,815	23.0	−3.1
Labour	David Perkin	8,115	19.0	+3.0
Majority		14,871	34.9	+4.9
Turnout		42,616	70.0	−0.7
Registered electors		60,876		
Conservative hold		Swing		

General election 1983: Chipping Barnet
Party	Candidate	Votes	%	±%
Conservative	Sydney Chapman	23,164	56.1	−1.0
Liberal	Christopher Perkin	10,771	26.1	+10.5
Labour	Nigel Smith	6,599	16.0	−9.3
Ecology	E. Parry	552	1.3	N/A
Independent	J. Hopkins	195	0.5	N/A
Majority		12,393	30.0	−1.8
Turnout		41,281	70.7	−4.9
Registered electors		58,423		
Conservative hold		Swing		

=== Elections in the 1970s ===
General election 1979: Chipping Barnet
Party	Candidate	Votes	%	±%
Conservative	Sydney Chapman	25,154	57.1	+9.8
Labour	Peter Dawe	11,147	25.3	−3.1
Liberal	David Ive	6,867	15.6	−5.8
National Front	Ronald Cole	865	2.0	−0.9
Majority		14,007	31.8	+12.9
Turnout		44,033	75.6	+2.0
Registered electors		58,254		
Conservative hold		Swing		

General election October 1974: Chipping Barnet
Party	Candidate	Votes	%	±%
Conservative	Reginald Maudling	19,661	47.3	−0.7
Labour	John Mills	11,795	28.4	+1.9
Liberal	Nesta Wyn Ellis	8,884	21.4	−4.1
National Front	Ronald Arthur Cole	1,207	2.9	N/A
Majority		7,866	18.9	−2.6
Turnout		41,547	73.6	−8.6
Registered electors		56,487		
Conservative hold		Swing		

General election February 1974: Chipping Barnet
Party	Candidate	Votes	%	±%
Conservative	Reginald Maudling	22,094	48.0	
Labour	John Mills	12,183	26.5	
Liberal	Nesta Wyn Ellis	11,714	25.5	
Majority		9,911	21.5	
Turnout		45,991	82.2	
Registered electors		55,984		
Conservative win (new seat)				

== See also ==
- List of parliamentary constituencies in London
