= Joseph da Costa =

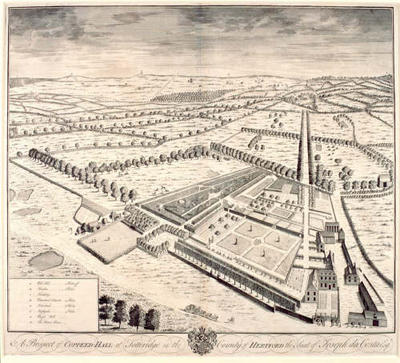
A Prospect of Coppeed Hall at Totteridge in the County of Hertford seat of Joseph Da Costa, Esq. 1739.

Fernando Joseph da Costa (1683–1753), alias Joseph Curiel, was a member of a wealthy family of merchants in London of Portuguese-Jewish origins, and the son of Alvaro Jacob da Costa, sometimes considered the founder of the Anglo-Sephardi community in London. He was able to buy Copped Hall in Totteridge, Hertfordshire, and thus became the lord of the Manor of Copped Hall.

== Early life and family ==
Da Costa was born in 1683, the second son of Alvaro Jacob (Rodrigues) da Costa (1646–1716), sometimes considered the founder of the Anglo-Sephardi community in London, and Leonor Mendes Gutiérres (1651–1727). He had brothers Anthony Moses da Costa (1667x9–1747) and John Benjamin da Costa (1674–1752). He married his cousin Leonora Mendes and they had six children who survived infancy.

Their daughter Catherine (Kitty) (1709-1746), married Joseph (Isaac) da Costa Villareal who died three years later. She then married William Mellish, member of Parliament for East Retford but was sued for breach of promise by her cousin Jacob (Philip) Mendes da Costa. (1707-86) in the ecclesiastical Consistory Court of Arches, the first time a Jew had brought a case in that forum.

Their son (Anthony) Moses da Costa (1712-80) was elected a fellow of The Royal Society.

== Career ==
The da Costa family had extensive mercantile interests that included the import of diamonds from India, wood from the Azores, and the export of coral from Italy to India. They were brokers for customers in European trading centres and shippers of bullion.

== Houses ==
In 1716, da Costa inherited a house in Budge Row, London, on the death of his father. By 1722, he owned Copped Hall (or Coppeed Hall) in Totteridge, Hertfordshire and was lord of the manor of Copped Hall. The house in Totteridge had extensive grounds and was significant enough to appear in Badeslade and Roqeu's Vitruvius Brittanicus in 1739. In 1758 the house was sold to Abraham Chambers, London Banker.

== Death ==
Da Costa died in 1753.
