= John Hey Puget =

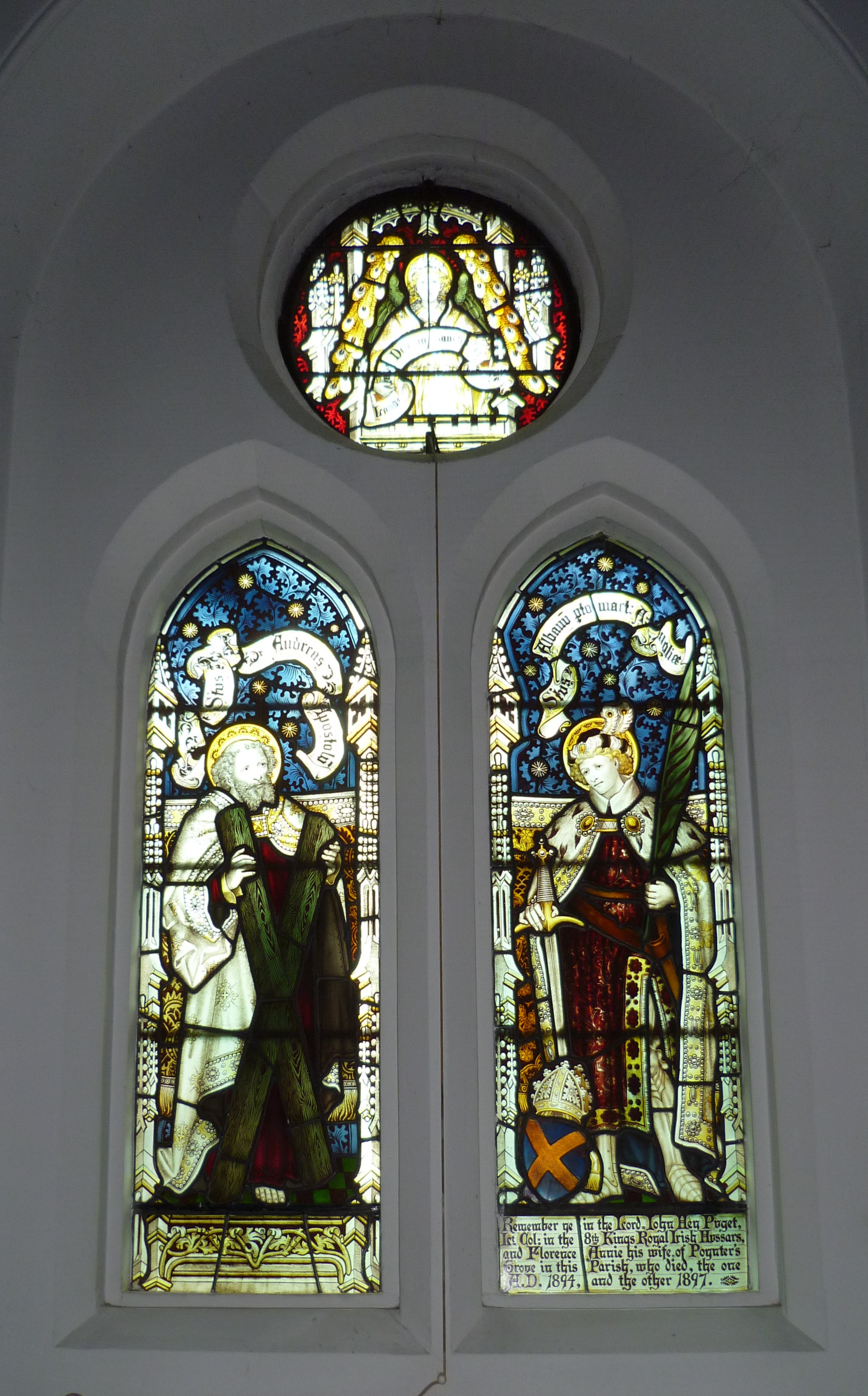
The Puget window at St Andrew's church, Totteridge.

John Hey Puget (1829–1894) was a colonel in the 8th King's Royal Irish Hussars. He was a fellow of the Royal Geographical Society.

Puget was the eldest son of John Hey Puget Sr. and Isabella Hawkins (c. 1797–1882), the daughter of a judge in India. He was educated at Trinity College, University of Cambridge (BA 1849, MA 1854). He married Florence Annie de Arroyave (died 1897) in 1863. They resided at Poynter's Grove, Totteridge.

Puget and his wife are remembered in a stained-glass window by Kempe, located on the north wall of St Andrew's church, Totteridge. The window that depicts St Alban, patron saint of the diocese, and St Andrew.
