= Burtonhole Lane and Pasture =

Nature reserve in north London, England

Coordinates: 51.620°N 0.207°W

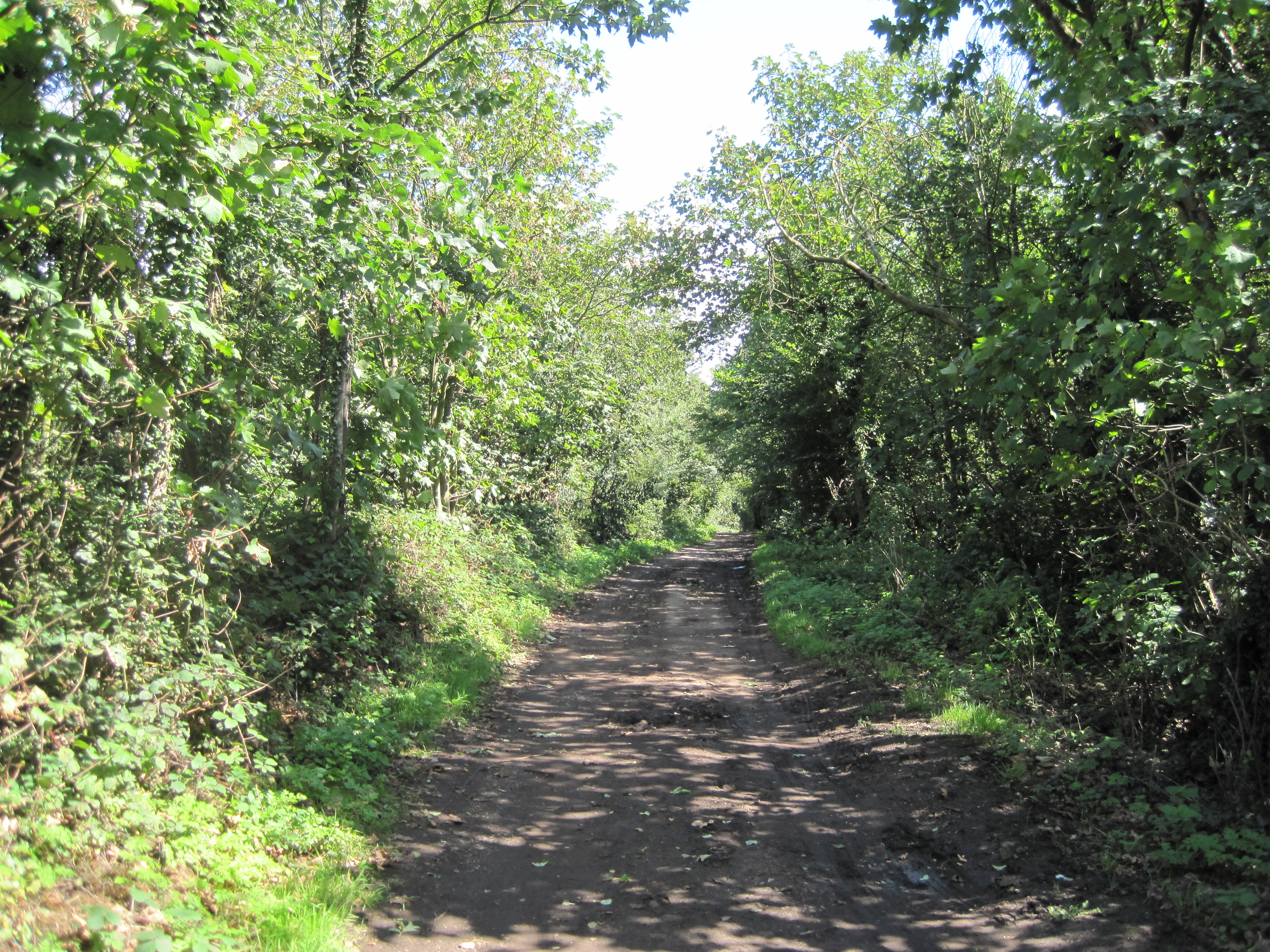
Burtonhole Lane

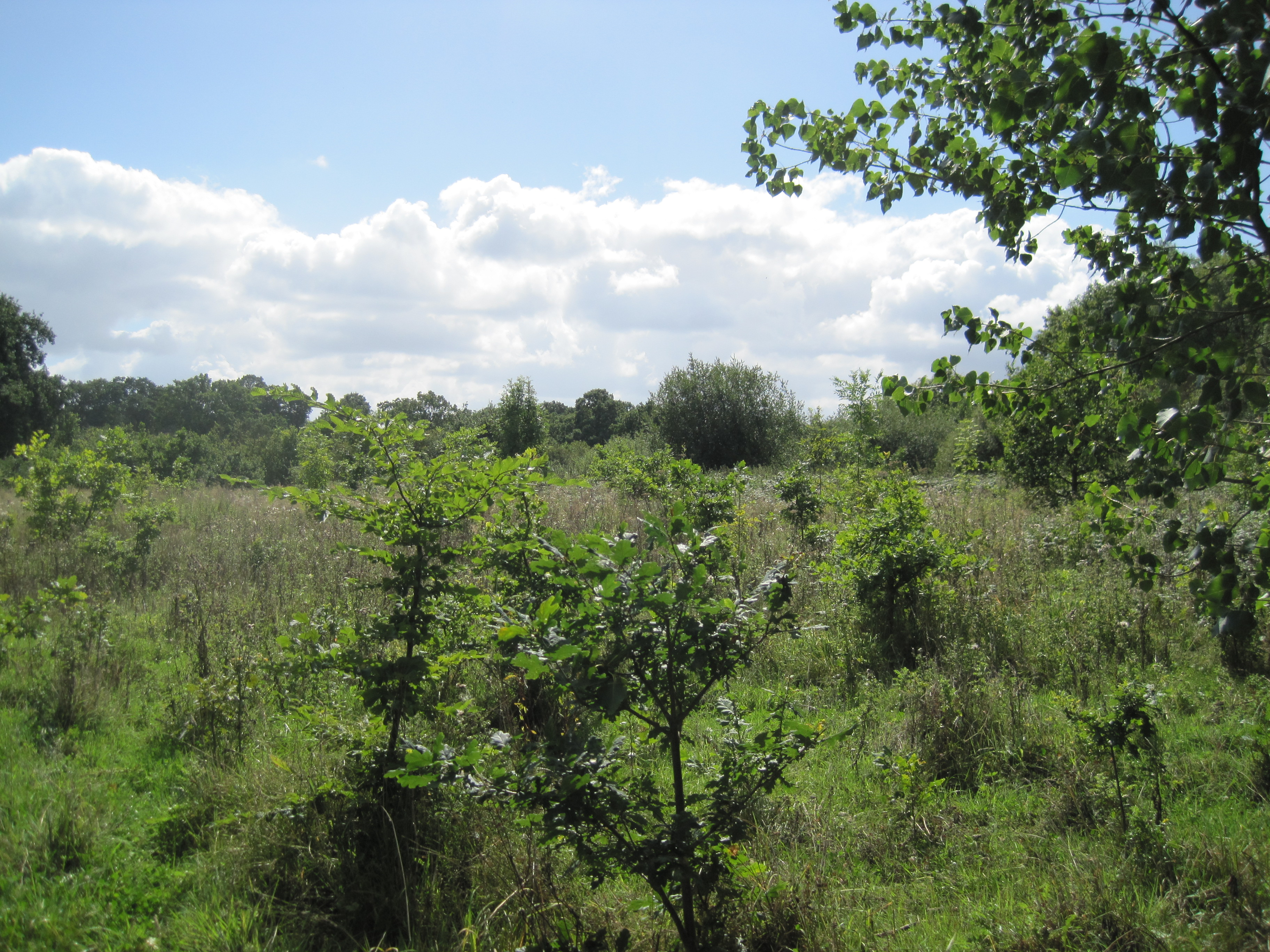
Field south of footpath

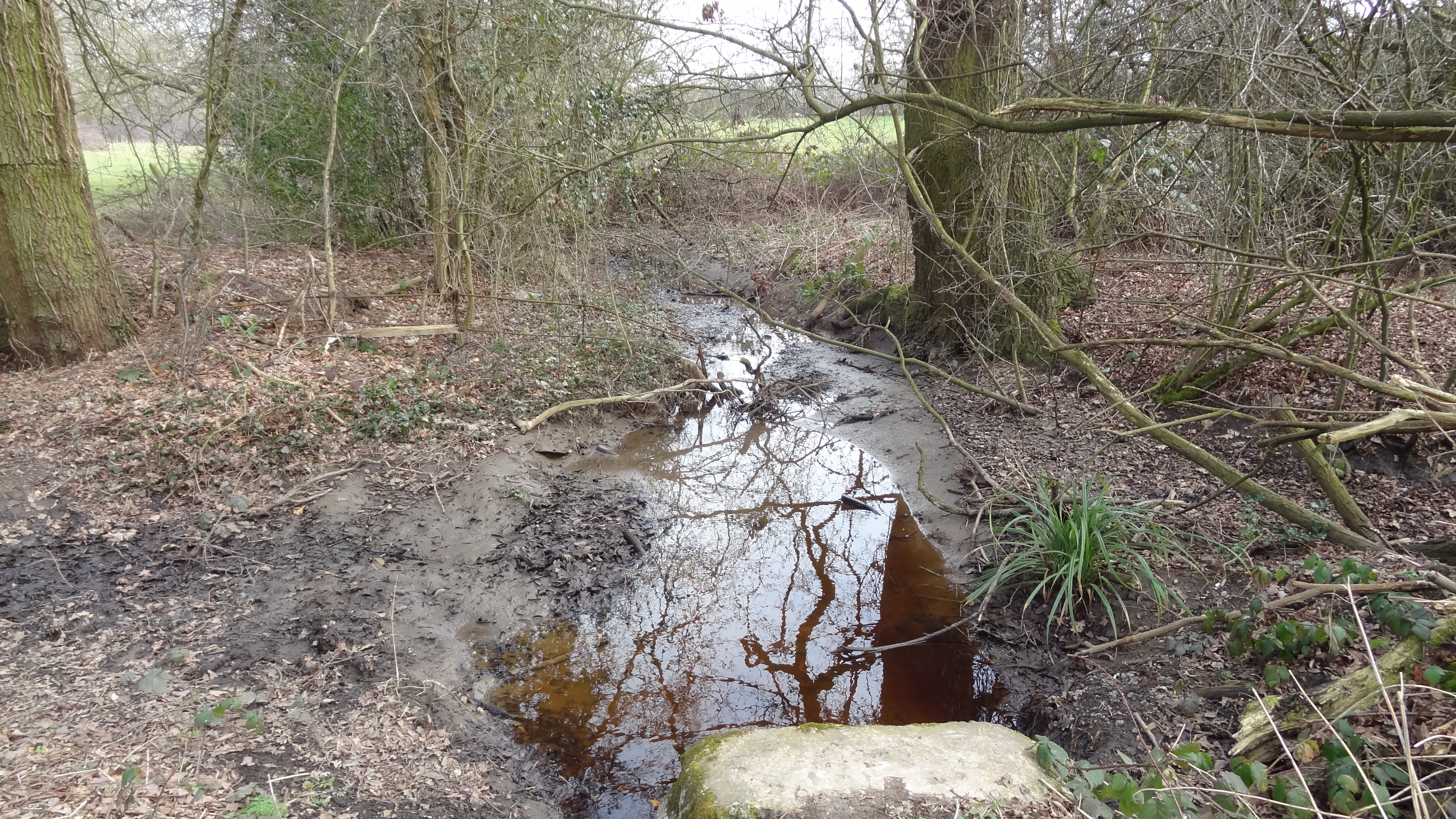
Burtonhole Brook

Burtonhole Lane and Pasture is a 6.5-hectare (16-acre) Site of Borough Importance for Nature Conservation, Grade II, between Mill Hill and Totteridge in the London Borough of Barnet. It consists of Burtonhole Lane between Partingdale Lane and Burtonhole Close, a footpath east from Burtonhole Lane towards Folly Brook, two fields south of the footpath, and a narrow belt of privately owned woodland north of the footpath. Burtonhole Brook, a tributary of Folly Brook, crosses Burtonhole Lane and the fields.

Burtonhole Lane is an old green lane which is now a public footpath and bridleway. It is flanked by tall hedgerows and woodland strips, which support a good variety of shrubs and a number of stately trees, most of them oak and ash. Birds include chaffinch, goldcrest, and green woodpecker, while mammals include stoat, weasel and bank vole. Frogs breed in a wet ditch at the base of the hedgerows.

The fields are old London clay grassland, dominated by Yorkshire fog with some tufted hair-grass. Damper areas and Burtonhole Brook support a much more diverse flora.

== See also ==
- Barnet parks and open spaces
- Nature reserves in Barnet
