= Edward Gordon Smith =

English photographer and postcard publisher

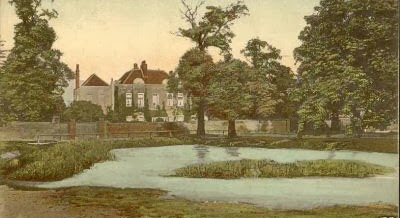
Edward Gordon Smith postcard of Poynter's Grove, Totteridge, London

Edward Gordon Smith (15 June 1857 – 30 May 1906) was an English photographer and postcard publisher. He produced photographs of London and its suburbs, as well as theatrical, railway and tramway subjects, and began publishing postcards in London in late 1902.

== Early life ==
Edward Gordon Smith was born in Westminster St James’s on 15 June 1857, the son of Edward Smith (1825 – 1895) and Helen Smith née Farrar (1820 – 1888). The 1881 England Census recorded Smith living at 5 Somerset Villas in Stoke Newington and working as a “Fancy Goods Salesman”. His father was described in the same census as a “Fancy Goods Warehouseman & Photographer Master employing 7 men and 4 women”, showing that photography was already part of the family business.

Advertisements and directories from the 1880s show his father operating at 3 Cheapside. In 1882, The Era (newspaper) advertised “Edward Smith, The Art Studio, 3, Cheapside”, offering photographic services to actors and actresses. Other advertisements identified the premises as “Edward Smith, The City Toy Shop, 3, Cheapside”, selling toys, games and other fancy goods. A photograph of Cheapside reproduced in J. K. Fisher’s City of London Past and Present (1976), dated to 1899, shows the premises with the signs “The City Toy Shop”, “E. Smith Photographer” and “Smith’s Studio”. A directory of London photographers, based on contemporary Post Office directories, lists Edward Smith as a photographer at the same address from 1881 to 1899. Photographs bearing the printed studio attribution “Edward Smith, The Art Studio, 3 Cheapside, E.C.” and contemporary copyright registrations identifying Edward Smith as both author and copyright owner of photographs from 3 Cheapside.

Gordon Smith worked in the family business; in 1886 he described himself as his father’s “late buyer and manager”. By 1901, Smith was recorded in the census as a photographer and employer, living at 68 Allerton Road, Stoke Newington, with his wife, Elizabeth Ellen Smith née Fox (1857 – 1912), and their two daughters Dorothy Fox Smith and Ethel Gladys Smith.

== Photography and postcard publishing ==
Smith photographed views of London, the surrounding counties, events, theatres, railways and tramways. His photographs were reproduced in contemporary publications. In 1902, The Sketch published a photograph of a scene from Paolo and Francesca at the St James's Theatre credited to “Gordon Smith, Allerton Road, N.” A report on the King’s Dinner to the Poor (1902) in celebration of the Coronation of Edward VII and Alexandra also included a photograph credited to “Gordon Smith, Allerton Road, N.”, showing guests and helpers in Stoke Newington. His photographs of the former New Providence Chapel in Gray's Inn Lane and Hermes Hill House, Pentonville, were reproduced later in Thomas Wright's The Life of William Huntington, S.S. (1909).

His photographs were variously marked or credited as “G. Smith”, “Gordon Smith” and “E. Gordon Smith”, and surviving attribution records are not always consistent. Some of his photographs were registered for copyright. Records held by The National Archives identify Edward Gordon Smith as the author or copyright owner of photographs, including scenes from The Great Millionaire at Drury Lane Theatre, registered in 1901, and views of the Bank and Mansion House and St Paul’s Cathedral, registered in 1906.

Smith began publishing postcards in late 1902 from 68 Allerton Road, Stoke Newington. His early cards depicted London and the countryside of Hertfordshire and Essex. The first series comprised 24 London views printed as lithographs; later cards included collotypes printed in Bavaria.

In 1905 he moved to 15 Stroud Green Road, Finsbury Park, where the business expanded its range, including the Types of London Life, Photorprint series, Gems of British Scenery, Beauty Spots of the British Isles, the colour Pinachrome series, London cards with twin views, and sets of railway-engine cards covering several British railway companies. The Pinachrome series included reproductions of paintings by the artist Walter Hayward-Young (also known as “Jotter”).

Smith died on 30 May 1906. His widow, Elizabeth, and daughters carried on the business. Sources differ on when it ceased: Anthony Byatt gives about 1916, while a later specialist account states that the family continued until the beginning of the 1920s. Further series including Beauty Spots of the British Isles and Gems of British Scenery were produced after his death.

Many of the firm’s postcards were numbered, but the numbering was not sequential: numbers were sometimes reused, while alphabetical suffixes identified variant cards. Cards with numbers as high as 6021 have been recorded, although the complete numbering sequence and chronology is uncertain. The attribution of material bearing the name “E. Gordon Smith” after Smith’s death is also uncertain. The name appears in a 1912 letter to the British Journal of Photography from 15 Stroud Green Road, demonstrating that the name continued to be used at the address after Smith’s death. Because the family continued the business, later uses of the “E. Gordon Smith” name do not necessarily identify Smith personally.

== Collections and legacy ==
Smith’s photographs and postcards provide a visual record of late-Victorian and early-Edwardian London, its people, places, transport and changing urban landscape. His photographs and postcards are preserved in institutional and local collections and reproduced in local-history literature.

The Victoria and Albert Museum’ Gabrielle Enthoven Collection contains photographs catalogued under “Gordon, E (photographers)”; several bear the printed attribution “Gordon Smith, 68 Allerton Road, N.” Its records include photographs of theatrical stage sets and productions at Drury Lane Theatre, including The Great Ruby (1898), Hearts and Trumps (1899), The Price of Peace (1900), The Best of Friends (1902), and The Flood Tide (1903).

The Historic England Archive’s Nigel Temple Collection contains historic postcards attributed to Edward Gordon Smith. The Canterbury Museum collection also attributes three London postcards to Edward Gordon Smith: views of the Tower and Mint, London Bridge and Victoria Embankment.

The London Transport Museum likewise catalogues multiple postcards attributed to Gordon Smith. The National Tramway Museum identifies Gordon Smith as the photographer of a commemorative postcard showing the inauguration of London County Council electric tramcar operations on 15 May 1903.

Local-history collections also preserve examples of postcards attributed to Smith, including collections documented by the Finchley Society and Basildon History Online.

His photographs have been reproduced in later local-history works. Brian Girling’s Westminster’s Villages (1996) includes a view of Wellington Buildings in Pimlico, while his Pimlico Through Time (2011) reproduces a photograph of Passmore Street; both bear the inscription “Gordon Smith”. David Mander’s Stoke Newington, Stamford Hill & Upper Clapton (1992) includes two photographs attributed to Smith. One shows Seven Sisters Road and Woodberry Down and is described as a view by local postcard publisher “G. Smith” from around 1900. The other shows Clapton Common and St Thomas’s Church and is dated to around 1901. Ian Finlay's London in Old Picture Postcards (1985) reproduces a Gordon Smith postcard of Winchmore Hill, published from 15 Stroud Green Road and postally used in March 1908.
