= Poynter's Grove =

House in North London, now demolished

Coordinates: 51.630466°N 0.194763°W

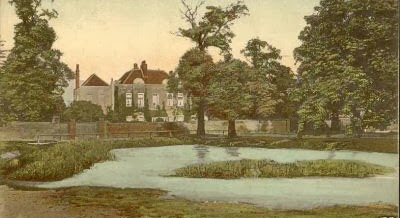
Postcard of Poynter's Grove, Totteridge, in the early 1900s, published by Edward Gordon Smith.

Poynter's Grove, sometimes known as Pointers Grove or Poynters Hall, was a house that once existed in Totteridge, north London.

The house was originally in the ownership of Sir Richard Gurney, a royalist in the English Civil War and Lord Mayor of London, who died in the Tower of London in 1647.

The house then had a succession of largely aristocratic owners before entering the ownership of the Puget Family. By the late nineteenth century, the house was owned by Colonel John Hey Puget of the 8th King's Royal Irish Hussars. It was sold around the time of his death in 1894 and had several other owners before being demolished around 1925. The tower clocks from the stables were donated to nearby St.Andrew’s church and still showing a correct time at the church tower. The other reminder of the Poynters Hall is a line of trees along the former approach road crossing Totteridge Green.

In 1876, Lewis Gordon died here. It was also the birthplace of the publisher Cecil Harmsworth King in 1901, whose grandmother, Geraldine Harmsworth, was the then-owner of the house.

== See also ==
- Peter Meyer (merchant)
