= Manor of Copped Hall =

Former manorial estate in Totteridge, Hertfordshire

Coordinates: 51.63188°N 0.20116°W

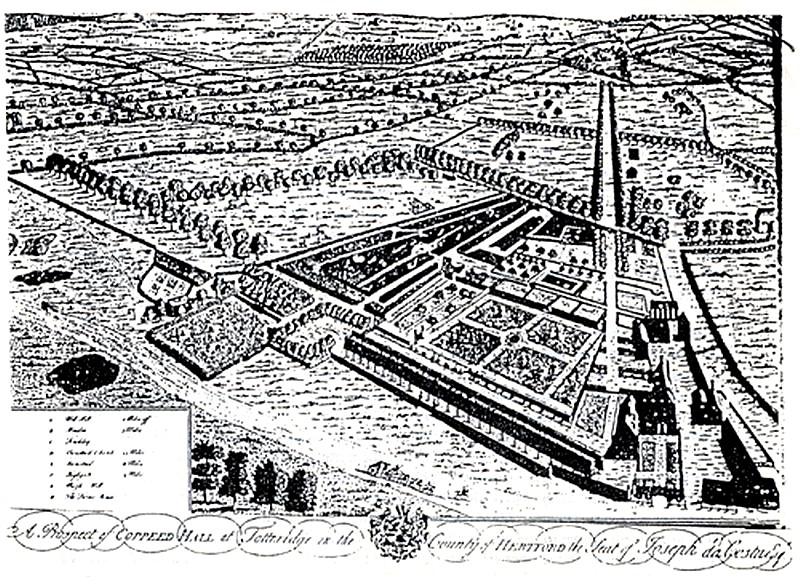
A Prospect of Coppeed Hall at Totteridge in the County of Hertford seat of Joseph Da Costa, Esq. 1739.

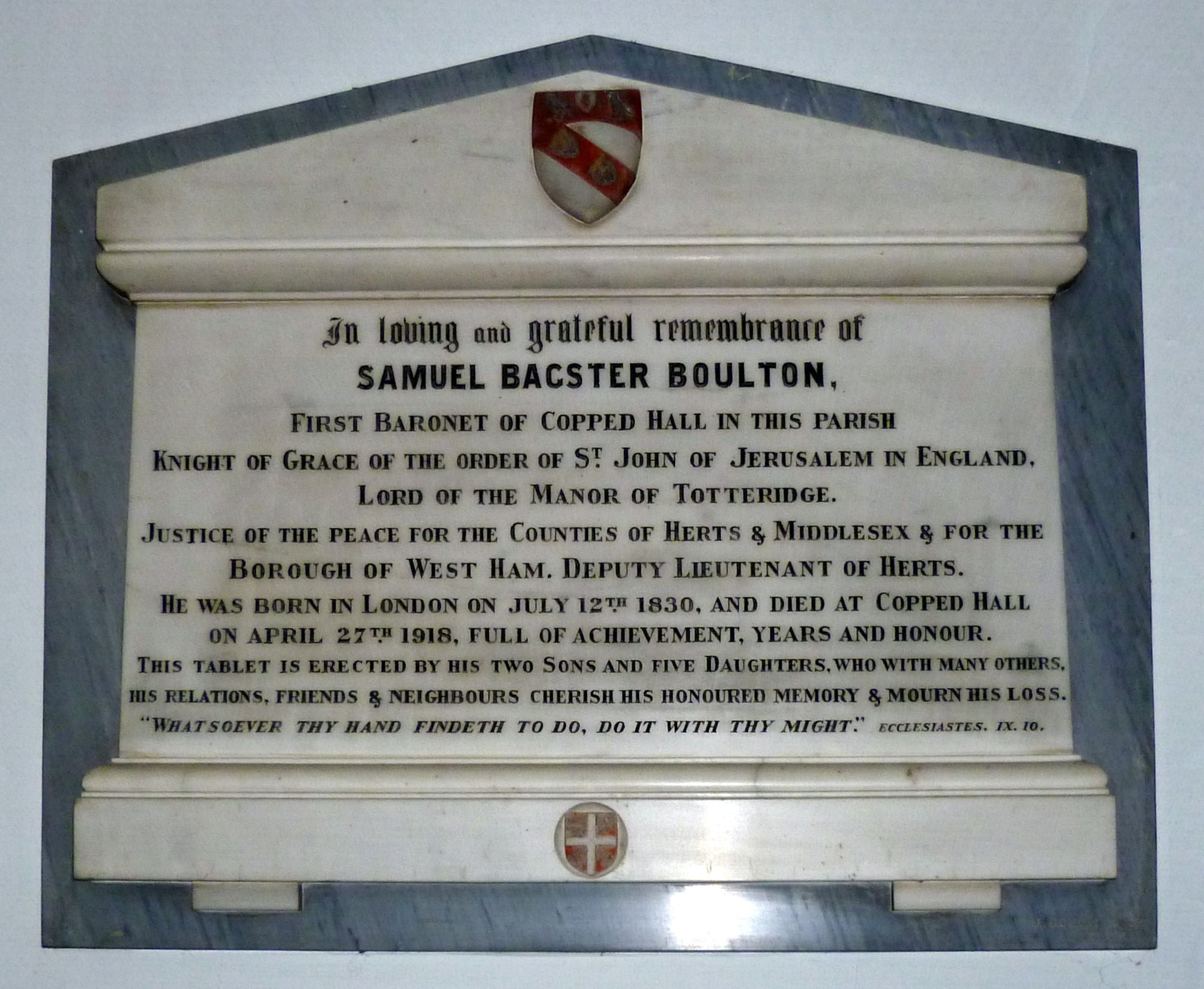
Samuel Bagster Boulton plaque in St Andrew's church, Totteridge.

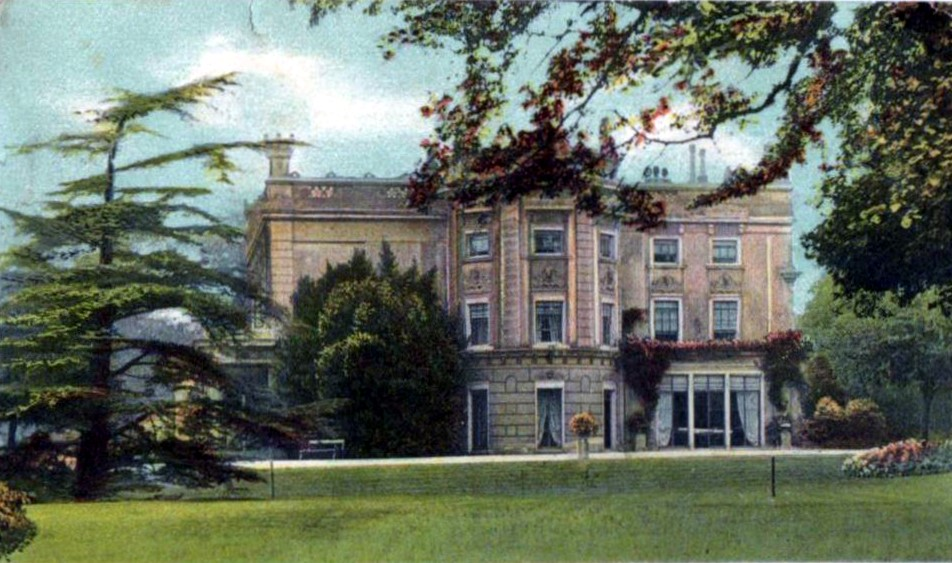
Copped Hall, c. 1905.

The Manor of Copped Hall (or Coppeed Hall) was located to the south of St Andrew's church in Totteridge, Hertfordshire, in an area that is now part of the London Borough of Barnet.

== Early history ==
The early history of the manor is uncertain but it may be the capital messuage or dwelling held in the 16th century by John Copwood who owned it at the time of his death in 1543, leaving a daughter, Sophia. It seems to have passed soon afterwards into the possession of the family of Clyffe. Richard Clyffe held a "manor or capital messuage" in Totteridge at his death in 1566, leaving it to his illegitimate son William Clyffe or Smyth, with remainder to Richard's brother Geoffrey and his son Richard. In the following century it was held by Edward Clyffe, who died about 1635, leaving two sons, William, on whom the property was settled, and Edward.

== Later history ==
The manor was bought by Joseph da Costa (1683–1753), a wealthy Portuguese-Jewish merchant, in 1722, when it had formal gardens and a large house. In 1758 it was bought by Abraham Chambers, a London banker. The grounds were later reworked by Humphry Repton to give a more natural appearance.

In the nineteenth century, Copped Hall was for some time owned by William Manning, father of Henry Edward Manning (Cardinal Manning), who was born there in 1808 and sold it in 1831. William's wife Mary Hunter re-designed the grounds, probably with the advice of Humphry Repton, damming the Folly Brook to create the ornamental Darland's Lake.

It was sold by auction in 1850. From 1875 it was occupied by Sir Samuel Bagster Boulton (1830–1918), who enlarged the house.

The house was later known as Darlands. It was demolished in 1928 by George Herbert Kemp, a biscuit entrepreneur. The grounds became a nature reserve in 1971 and currently is a Site of Nature Conservation Interest.
