= William Mellish (died 1791) =

William Mellish (c.1710 – 16 December 1791) was a British government administrator and Member of Parliament.

He was born the second son of Joseph Mellish of Doncaster, Yorkshire and Blyth Hall, Nottinghamshire and was educated at Eton School (1725) and Peterhouse, Cambridge (1726). He studied law in Lincoln's Inn (1725) and the Inner Temple (1734). He succeeded to Blyth in 1757 on the death of his elder brother Edward. His younger brother Joseph was MP for Great Grimsby.

He was employed as the Lord Treasurer’s remembrancer in the Exchequer from 1733 to 1754. He was appointed a Commissioner of Excise for 1751-1760 and Receiver General of Customs from 1760 to January 1763 and from 1765 to 1786. He served as Joint Secretary to the Treasury in July 1765.

Mellish was elected the Member of Parliament for East Retford from 1741 to 18 December 1751.

He died on 16 December 1791 and was buried at St Mary and St Martin's Church, Blyth, Nottinghamshire. He had married twice, firstly Kitty da Costa, the daughter of Joseph da Costa, with whom he had 2 sons and secondly Anne, the daughter of John Gore of Bush Hill Park, Enfield, London, with whom he had 5 sons and a daughter. His son Charles by his first wife became MP for Pontefract and then Aldborough. His third son William (by his second wife) was MP for Great Grimsby.
