= Charles Mellish =

British lawyer and politician

Charles Mellish (6 July 1737 – 29 December 1796) was a British lawyer and politician who sat in the House of Commons from 1774 to 1784.

== Early life ==
Mellish was born in 1737 in London, England. He was the only surviving son of William Mellish, MP, of Blyth, Nottinghamshire, and his first wife, Kitty da Costa. He entered Lincoln's Inn in 1761 and was called to the Bar in 1766. He inherited Blyth Hall, Nottinghamshire on the death of his father in 1791.

== Career ==
Mellish was Recorder of Newark, Nottinghamshire from 1770 to 1777, and again from 1779 to 1794. He was Commissioner of Stamps from 1793 to 1796.

Mellish managed the Yorkshire estates of Viscount Galway, with whom he was connected by marriage and was thereby eligible to be, and was elected as, Member of Parliament for Pontefract in the 1774 general election. In the 1780 general election Mellish was placed by the Duke of Newcastle as MP for Aldborough, Yorkshire. Initially a loyal supporter in Parliament of Newcastle and Lord North, his political career ended in 1784 when he had a disagreement with Newcastle and was asked to resign his seat. Mellish did not stand in the 1784 general election, and stood unsuccessfully for Pontefract in 1790. His will, proved in 1798, bequeaths an annuity of £100 pa from the Iter Boreale estate in Jamaica. This was a plantation producing sugar and rum which held 278 enslaved people in 1809.Legacies of British Slave Ownership

== Personal interests and family life ==
Mellish was interested in antiquarian study, particularly in the history of Nottinghamshire. He was working on an unfinished county history at the time of his death in late 1796.

Mellish married Judith Stapleton (died 1806) with whom he had two sons and two daughters. Eventually, Mellish disinherited his elder son, Joseph Charles, due to the latter's extravagance. The Blyth estate passed to his second son, Henry Francis, who lost it due to gambling. The neighbouring property, known as Hodsock Priory, and which Mellish had also owned, ended up in the hands of his oldest daughter, Anne, who rebuilt the house there.

Parliament of Great Britain
Preceded by Henry Strachey; Robert Monckton	Member of Parliament for Pontefract; 1774 – 1780; With: Sir John Goodricke, Bt	Succeeded by William Nedham; 4th Viscount Galway
Preceded by Hon. William Hanger; William Baker	Member of Parliament for Aldborough; 1780 – 1784; With: Sir Richard Sutton, Bt to November 1780; Edward Onslow 1780–81; Sir Samuel Brudenell Fludyer, Bt from 1781	Succeeded by Sir Samuel Brudenell Fludyer, Bt; John Gally Knight
