= Darland's Lake Nature Reserve =

Lake in Barnet, England

Coordinates: 51.6254°N 0.2047°W

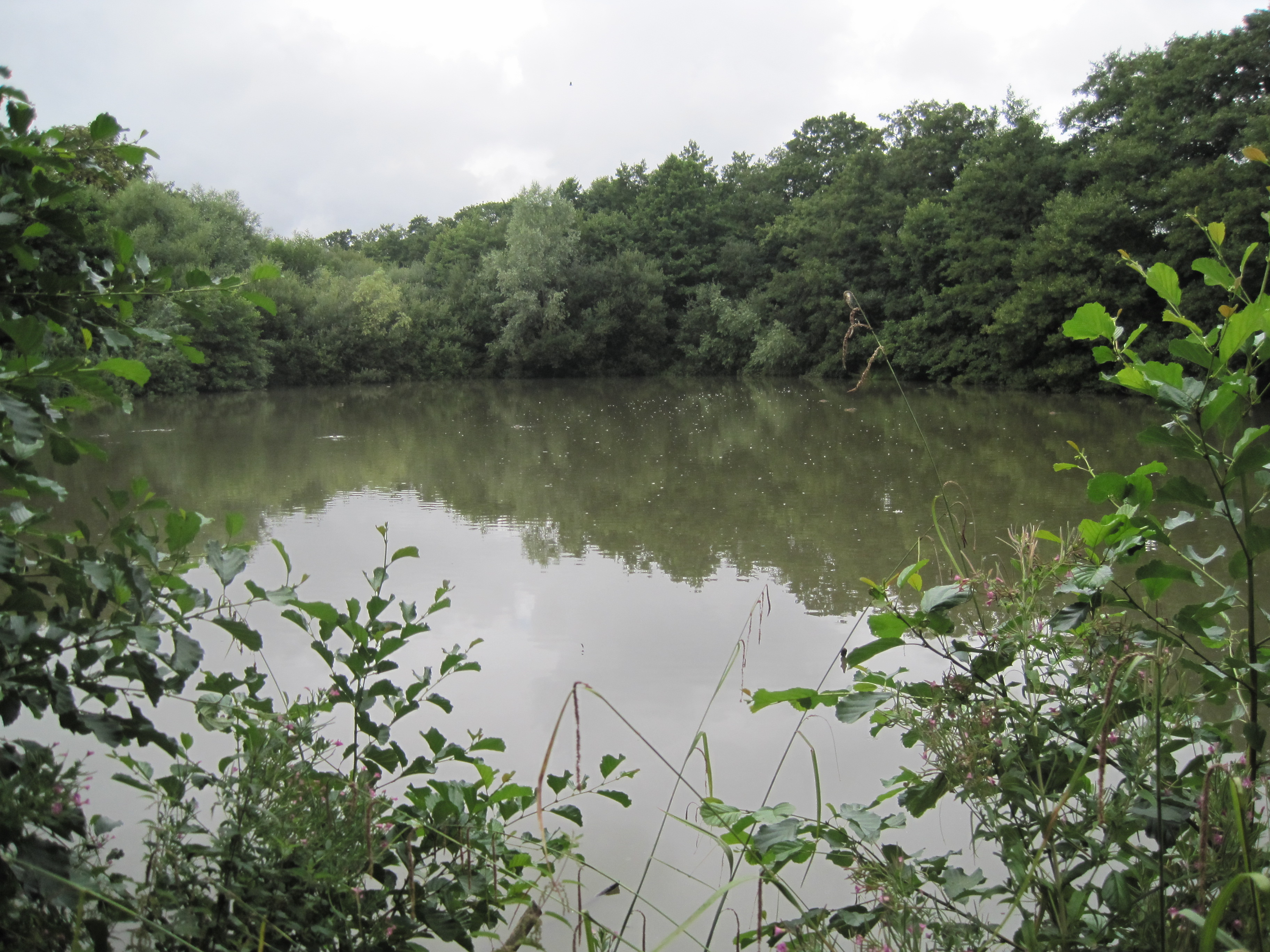
Darland's Lake

Darland's Lake Nature Reserve is a nature reserve south of Totteridge Village in Barnet, England. It is owned by the London Borough of Barnet and was managed from 1971 by the Hertfordshire and Middlesex Wildlife Trust, and more recently by the borough council. In 2007 the council spent £215,000 on repairing the dam and other works, and then proposed leasing the reserve to the Wildlife Trust. The transfer did not take place and in September 2017 a trust was set up by the London Wildlife Trust and local residents associations which took over the management of Darland's Lake. In 2020, the Darlands Conservation Trust launched an appeal to raise £450,000 for excavation to prevent the lake drying up.

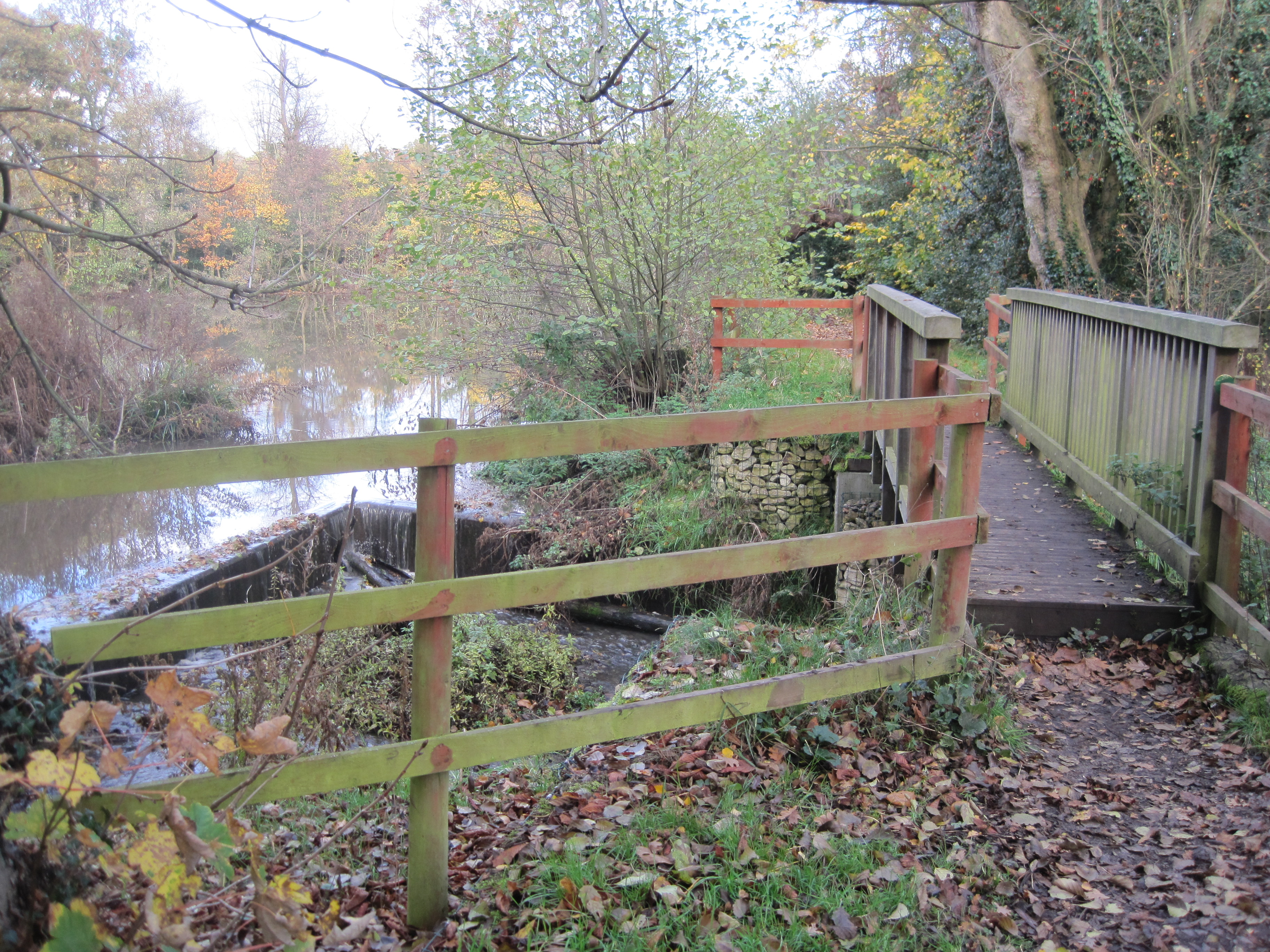
Darland's Lake dam and footbridge

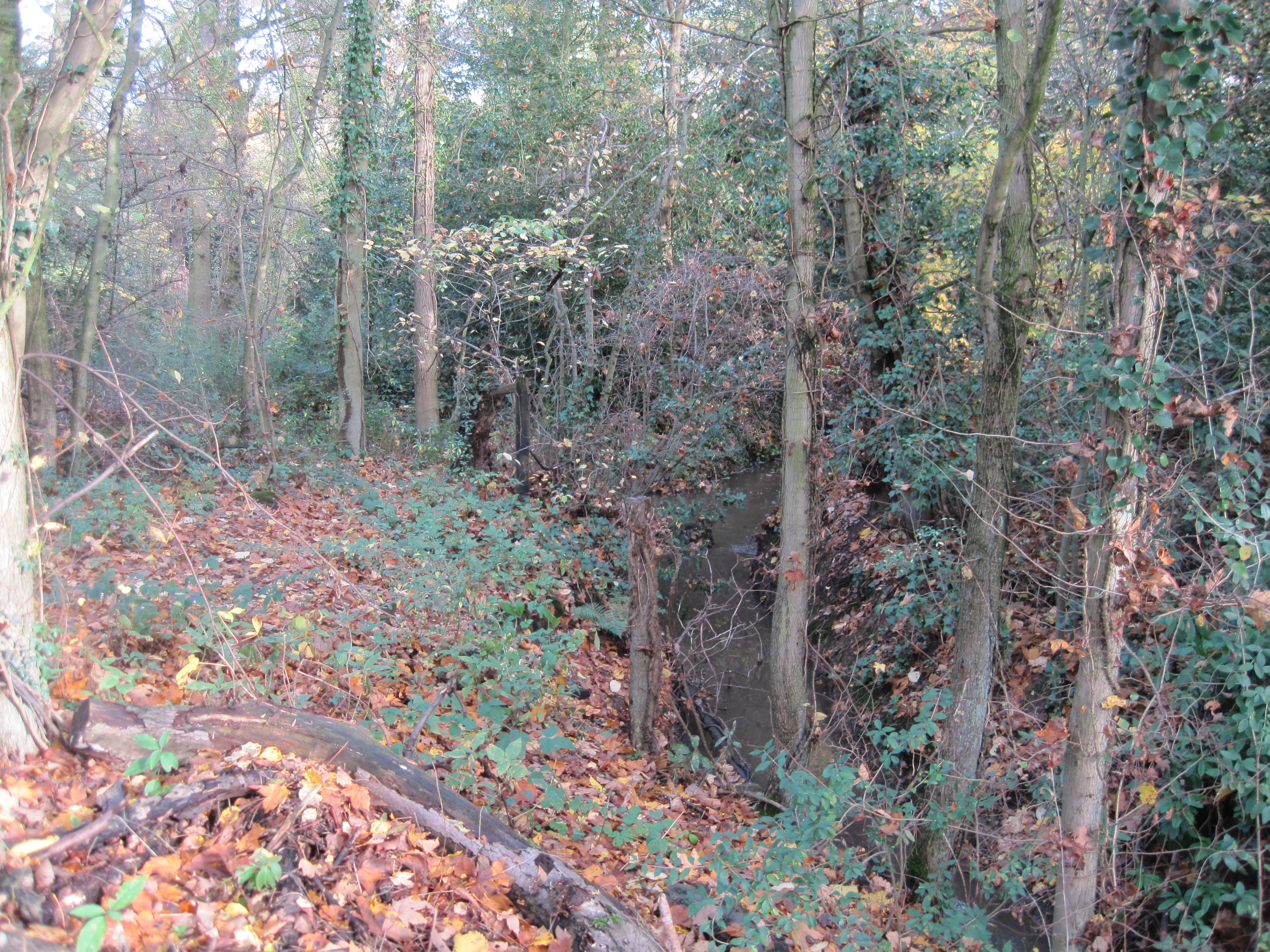
Folly Brook in Darland's Lake Nature Reserve

The site was once part of Copped Hall, an estate dating from the sixteenth century. From 1780 it was occupied by William Manning MP, and his son Cardinal Manning was born there. Darland's Lake was created as an ornamental lake by damming Folly Brook, probably planned by William Manning's wife, Mary, with advice from Humphry Repton.

The lake is very shallow, with extensive reed beds, and the reserve also includes woodland. It has a diverse range of breeding birds and eighteen species of mammal have been recorded, including stoat and weasel. It is also of value for grass snakes, amphibians, fungi and invertebrates.

Folly Brook and Darland's Lake Nature Reserve are together designated a Site of Borough Importance for Nature Conservation, Grade 1. Darland's Lake was formerly a Site of Special Scientific Interest, but the designation was withdrawn when it was discovered that the rarest plants had been introduced. According to the London Ecology Unit's Nature Conservation in Barnet, published in 1997, Darland's Lake was one of seven sites identified by Barnet Council as meeting the criteria for designation as a Local Nature Reserve, and it is the only one of the seven which the Council has not designated.

There is access by a path from The Close, Totteridge Village, and by a footpath from Southover which follows Folly Brook to the lake, as well as by footpaths opposite St.Andrew’s church and from Mill Hill.

== See also ==
- Barnet parks and open spaces
- Nature reserves in Barnet
