= Totteridge and Woodside =

Electoral ward in Barnet, London, England

- Electoral ward for the Barnet London Borough Council
- Borough: Barnet
- County: Greater London
- Population: 14,493 (2021)
- Major settlements: Mill Hill
- Area: 9.541 km²

Current electoral ward
- Created: 2022
- Councillors: 3
- Created from: Totteridge

Totteridge and Woodside is an electoral ward in the London Borough of Barnet. The ward was first used in the 2022 elections. It elects three councillors to Barnet London Borough Council.

== Geography ==
The ward is named after the suburbs of Totteridge and Woodside Park.

== Councillors ==
Election	Councillors		
2022	Alison Cornelius (Conservative)	Caroline Stock (Conservative)	Richard Cornelius (Conservative)

== Elections ==
=== 2022 Barnet London Borough Council election ===
Totteridge and Woodside (3 seats)
Party	Candidate	Votes	%	±%
Conservative	Alison Cornelius*	2,041	49.2	
Conservative	Caroline Stock*	1,986	47.8	
Conservative	Richard Cornelius*	1,975	47.6	
Labour	Vanessa David	1,435	34.6	
Labour	Parmodh Sharma	1,310	31.6	
Labour	Laurie Williams*	1,283	30.9	
Liberal Democrats	Jack Cohen	555	13.4	
Green	Fabio Vollono	455	11.0	
Liberal Democrats	Tanya Spensley	443	10.7	
Liberal Democrats	Oliver Rodwell	403	9.7	
Rejoin EU	Brendan Donnelly	213	5.1	
Turnout		4,151	40.0	
Conservative win (new seat)				
Conservative win (new seat)				
Conservative win (new seat)				
