= London Ecology Unit =

The London Ecology Unit (LEU) provided advice to London boroughs on nature conservation issues between 1986 and 2000. It published a series of handbooks, some on specific conservation issues, and some which gave detailed descriptions of Sites of Importance for Nature Conservation (SINCs) in each borough. The handbooks provided a basis for addressing nature conservation in the boroughs' Unitary Development Plans, and for policy decisions in planning and leisure services.

== History ==
In 1982 the Greater London Council (GLC) established an Ecology Team, which commissioned the London Wildlife Trust to undertake a survey of wildlife sites in London. The GLC was abolished in 1986, but the work of the Ecology Team was carried on by the LEU, with oversight provided by a joint committee of London boroughs, the London Ecology Committee. In April 2000 the LEU was merged into the newly established Greater London Authority.

The London Ecology Unit was responsible for identifying a site as a site of Metropolitan importance for nature conservation.

== Publications ==
The London Ecology Unit published several documents including on promoting nature conservation across London, habitat creation and nature conservation in each borough. The London Ecology Unit also published Building Green - A Guide to using plants on roofs, walls and pavements.
