= Woodside Park, Barnet =

Area in London, England

Coordinates: 51.617°N 0.185°W

Woodside Park
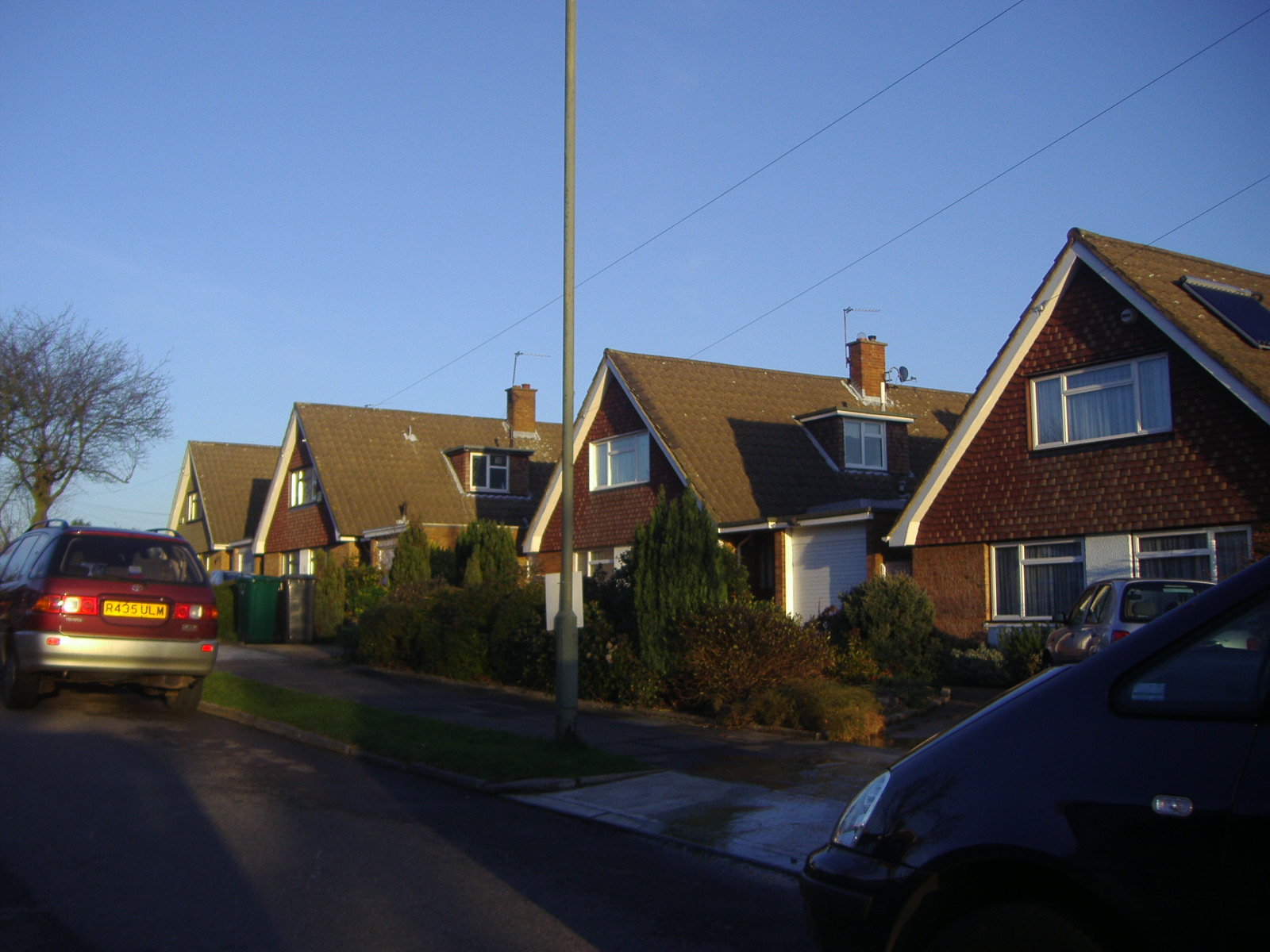
- Houses on Arlington

- Location within Greater London
- OS grid reference: TQ256925
- London borough: Barnet
- Ceremonial county: Greater London
- Region: London
- Country: England
- Sovereign state: United Kingdom
- Post town: LONDON
- Postcode district: N12
- Dialling code: 020
- Police: Metropolitan
- Fire: London
- Ambulance: London
- UK Parliament: Chipping Barnet
- London Assembly: Barnet and Camden

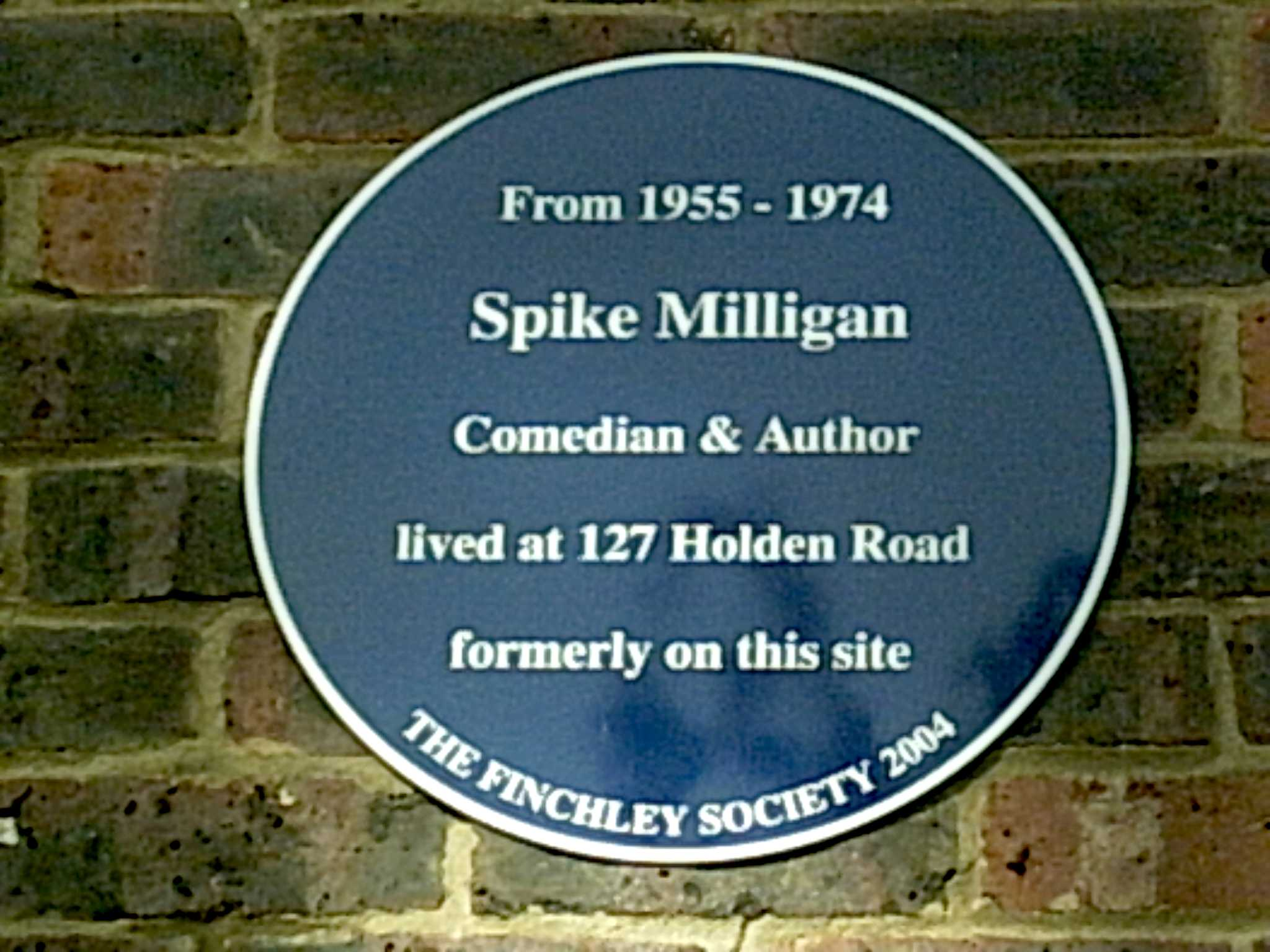
Spike Milligan plaque (erected 2004, pictured September 2005)

Woodside Park is a suburban residential area in the London Borough of Barnet, in the North Finchley postal district of N12.

== Description ==
The area to the east of the tube station consists predominantly of large Victorian and Edwardian houses, many of which have been converted into flats. The area also features Woodside Park Synagogue and a Jewish school operating from the synagogue.

The western and north-western part of the area, which can also be regarded as the part of Totteridge in N12 rather than N20, is sometimes called Woodside Park Garden Suburb and consists of semi-detached or detached 3 to 4 bedroom houses built in the 1950s. It includes the Woodside Park Club. The eastern boundary of the Garden Suburb is the Dollis Brook and the southern boundary is the Folly Brook. To the south of this suburb is Woodside Park Garden Suburb proper, an area of 1920s and 1930s houses, where all but one of the roads (Linkside) are named after places in Sussex, where the developer, Fred Ingram, came from.

Between the Garden Suburb and the Northern line is an area originally of Victorian housing. Many of the houses, including the former residence of Spike Milligan (now marked by a blue plaque placed in 2004 - see picture in this article), have been replaced by modern housing or flats. The estate where Emma Bunton grew up is also located in the area.

Sussex Ring is a small commercial area situated around the mini roundabout at Chanctonbury Way, formerly the primary shopping hub of Woodside Park in North London. Initially, it provided essential services, including a post office, butcher, and ironmonger, catering to the needs of the local community.

Following the development of the North Finchley shopping parade, many of Sussex Ring's original shops closed and were replaced by more specialised businesses. Despite this shift, Sussex Ring remains a focal point for the local community. It hosts a selection of cafés, hair salons, and beauty services, maintaining its role as a social gathering spot.

Community events, such as traditional Christmas carol singing, are frequently held at Sussex Ring, reinforcing its significance as a local meeting place.

== History ==
A house of special interest is Woodside Grange, built in the late 19th century. Pevsner describes it as: "Battlemented, with an irregular E entrance front of 3-2-2 bays, with stair tower rising behind." It was built by James Turle as a home and consultancy, and later owned by Sir Arthur Douglas Derry, the owner of Derry and Toms store. In 1927, it was acquired by the Finchley Catholic Grammar School.

== Politics and government ==
Woodside Park is covered by the Chipping Barnet constituency for elections to the House of Commons of the United Kingdom.

Woodside Park is covered by the Totteridge and Woodside ward for elections to Barnet London Borough Council.

== See also ==
- Woodside Park tube station
