= Folly Brook =

Stream in North London, England

Coordinates: 51.6174°N 0.1897°W

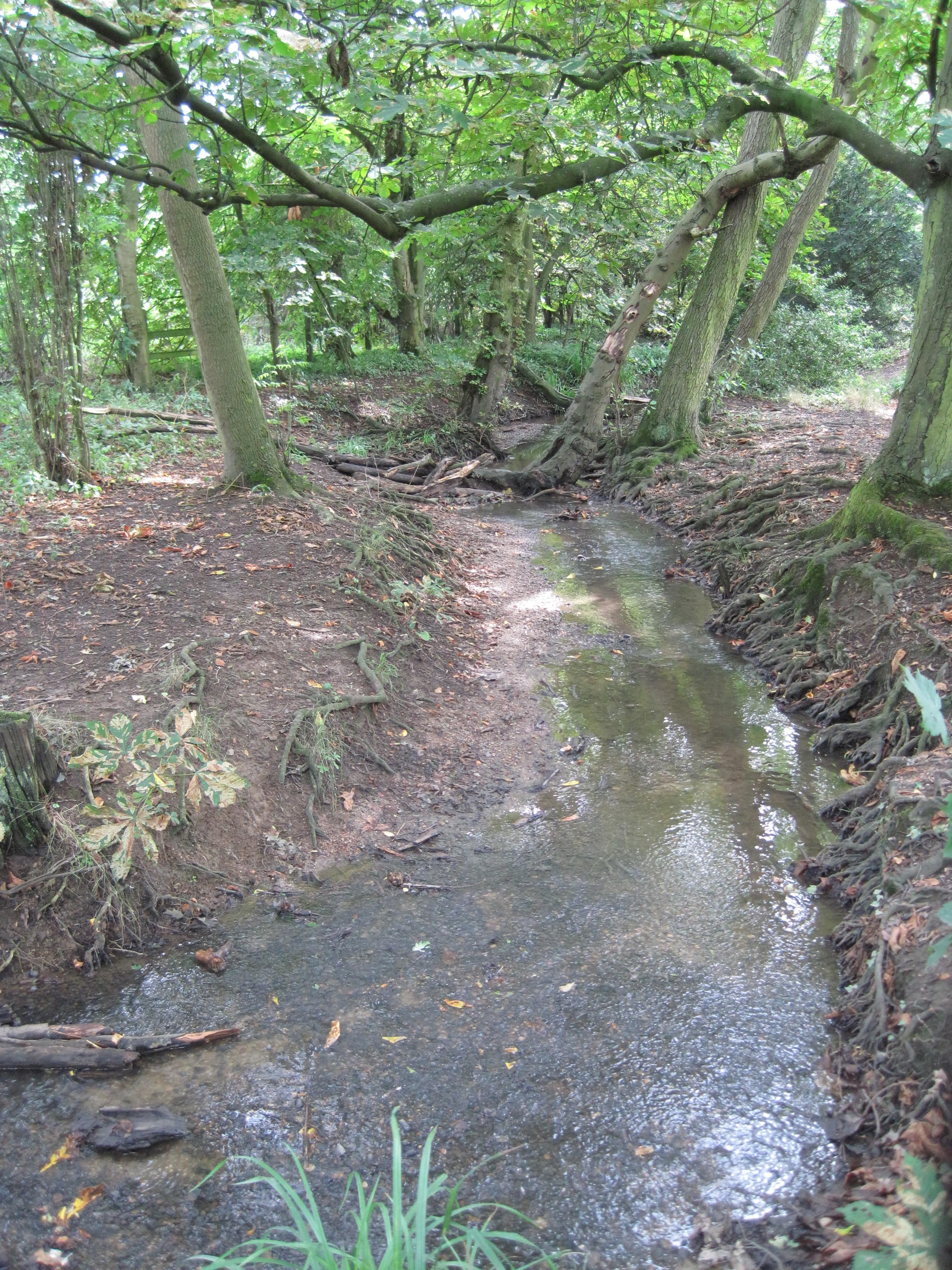
Folly Brook

Folly Brook is a 2 1/4-mile (3.6 km) long brook in the London Borough of Barnet. It is a tributary of Dollis Brook, which is a tributary of the River Brent, which is a tributary of the River Thames. Folly Brook is lined for most of its length by narrow strips of woodland and scrub, with a good variety of trees and shrubs. It is one of the best streams in Barnet for small aquatic invertebrates, including several species of caddis fly and a stonefly, which are only found in unpolluted waters.

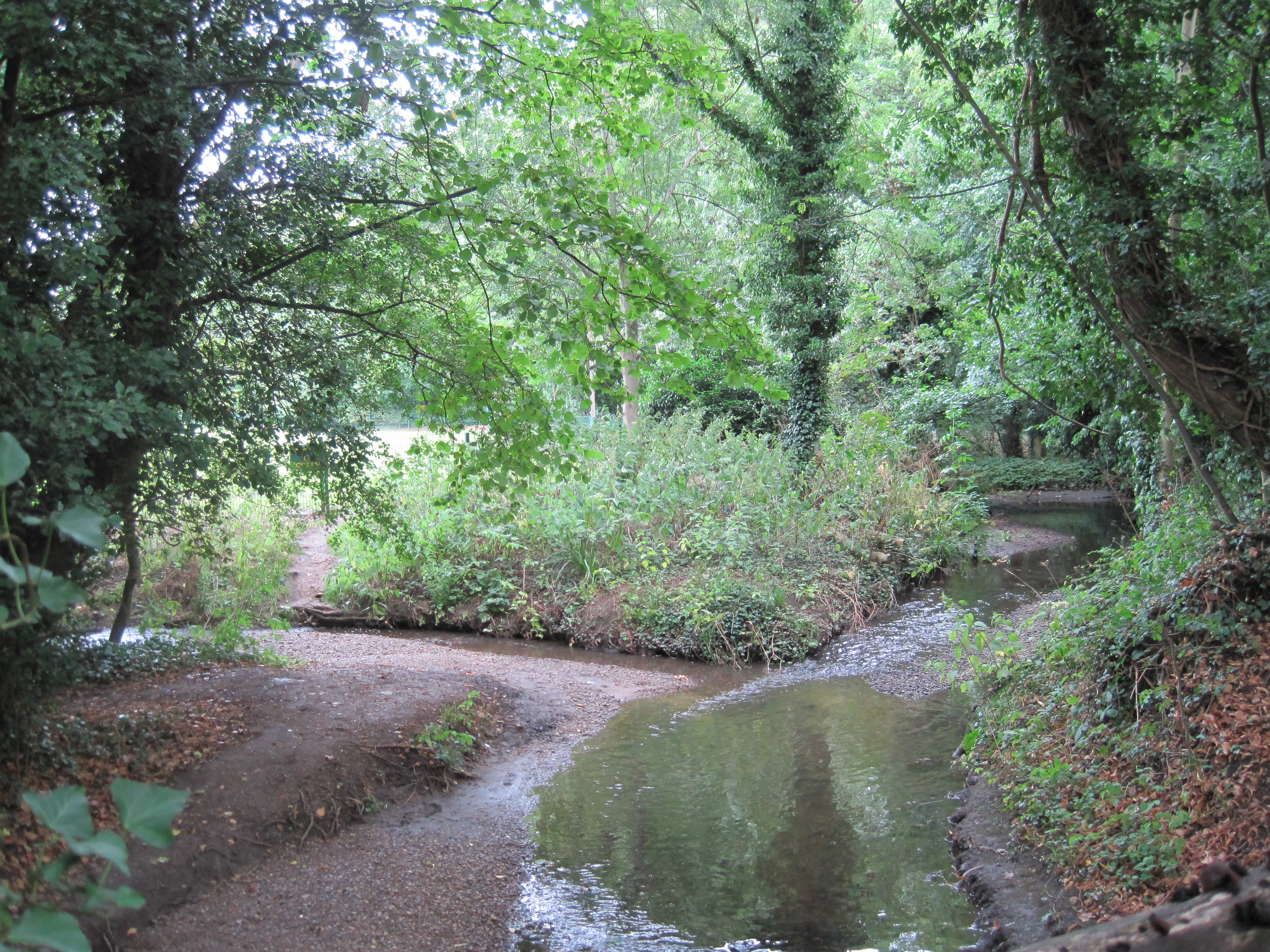
Confluence of Folly Brook (left) with Dollis Brook

== The upper brook ==
Folly Brook rises near the bottom of Highwood Hill, Mill Hill, and flows east through fields and public open spaces to Woodside Park. From Highwood Hill to Darland's Lake Nature Reserve the brook passes through private land which is not open to public access, apart from a short section next to a footpath through Folly Farm. Darland's Lake was originally ornamental, created by damming the brook, but the lake and surrounding woods are now a nature reserve.

== The lower brook ==
The lower part of the brook from Darland's Lake through Folly Brook Valley to the junction with Dollis Brook is public open space. A footpath alongside the brook starts close to the Darland's noticeboard east of the lake, and goes through woods to grassland between Burtonhole Lane and Pasture and Woodridge Nature Reserve, where it is joined by its tributary, Burtonhole Brook. Folly Brook then goes under Southover to meet Dollis Brook not far from Woodside Park Underground station, connecting it with the Dollis Valley Greenwalk.

Folly Brook and Darland's Lake Nature Reserve are a Site of Borough Importance for Nature Conservation, Grade I.

== Boundary ==
Until 1965 the brook marked the boundary between the boroughs of Hendon to the south and Totteridge to the north. Hendon was in Middlesex and Totteridge in Hertfordshire, and the brook was thus also the boundary between the two counties.

== See also ==
- Nature reserves in Barnet
