= Totteridge =

Area of the London Borough of Barnet

Coordinates: 51.6354°N 0.2000°W

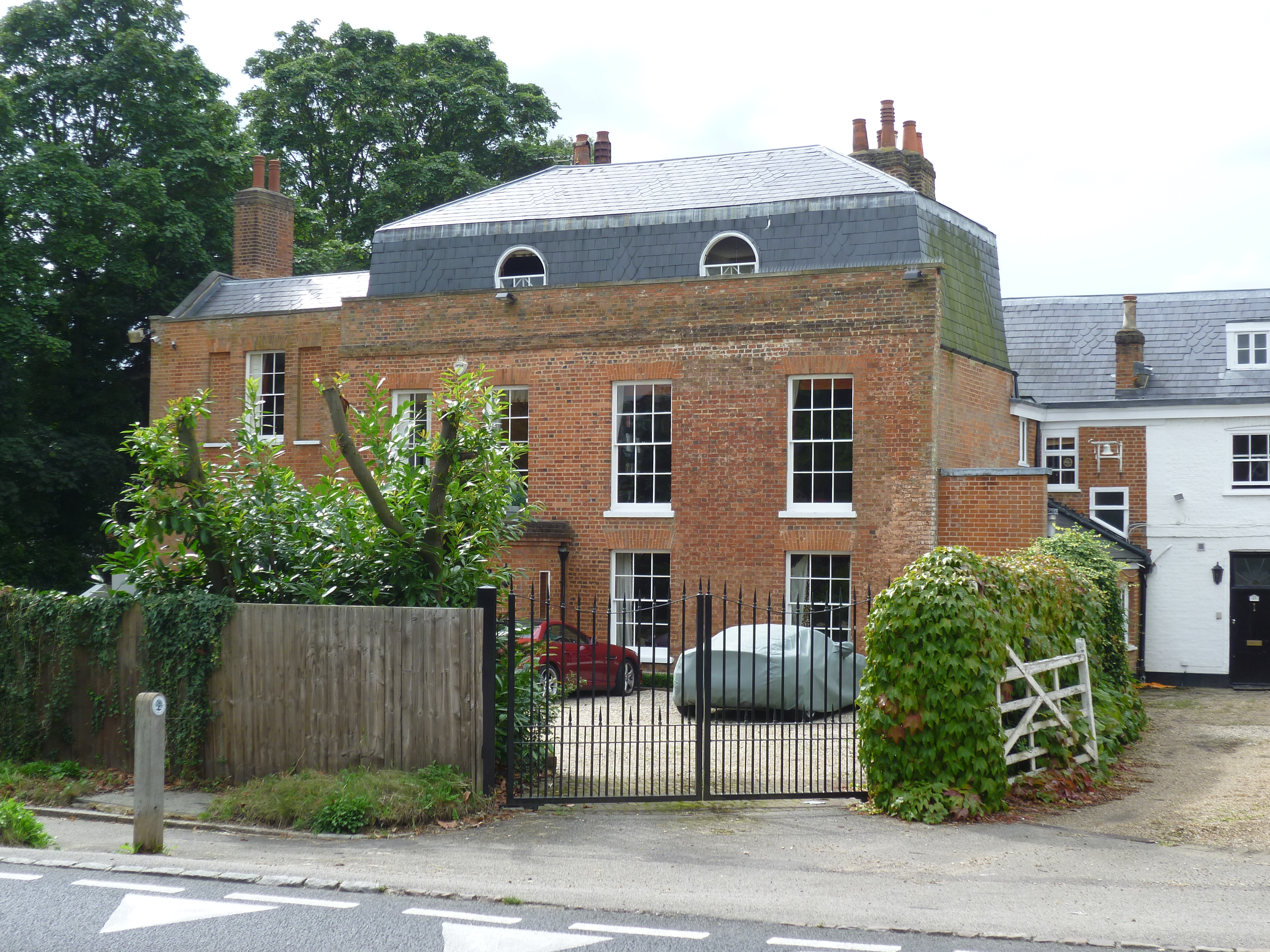

- Location within Greater London
- Population: 15,159 (2011 Census. Ward)
- OS grid reference: TQ245945
- London borough: Barnet
- Ceremonial county: Greater London
- Region: London
- Country: England
- Sovereign state: United Kingdom
- Post town: LONDON
- Postcode district: N20
- Dialling code: 020
- Police: Metropolitan
- Fire: London
- Ambulance: London
- UK Parliament: Chipping Barnet
- London Assembly: Barnet and Camden

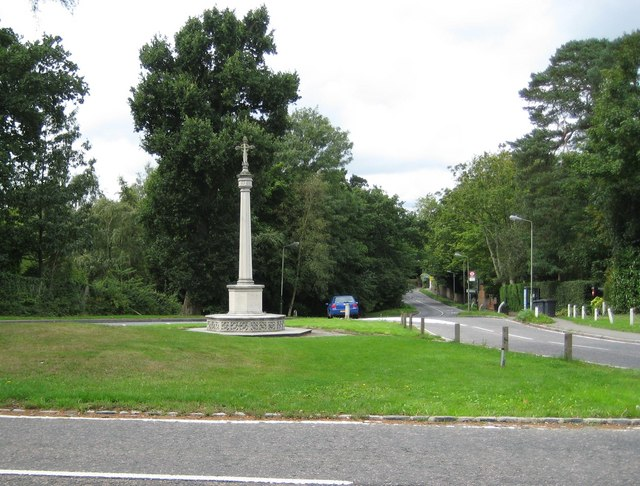
Totteridge War Memorial

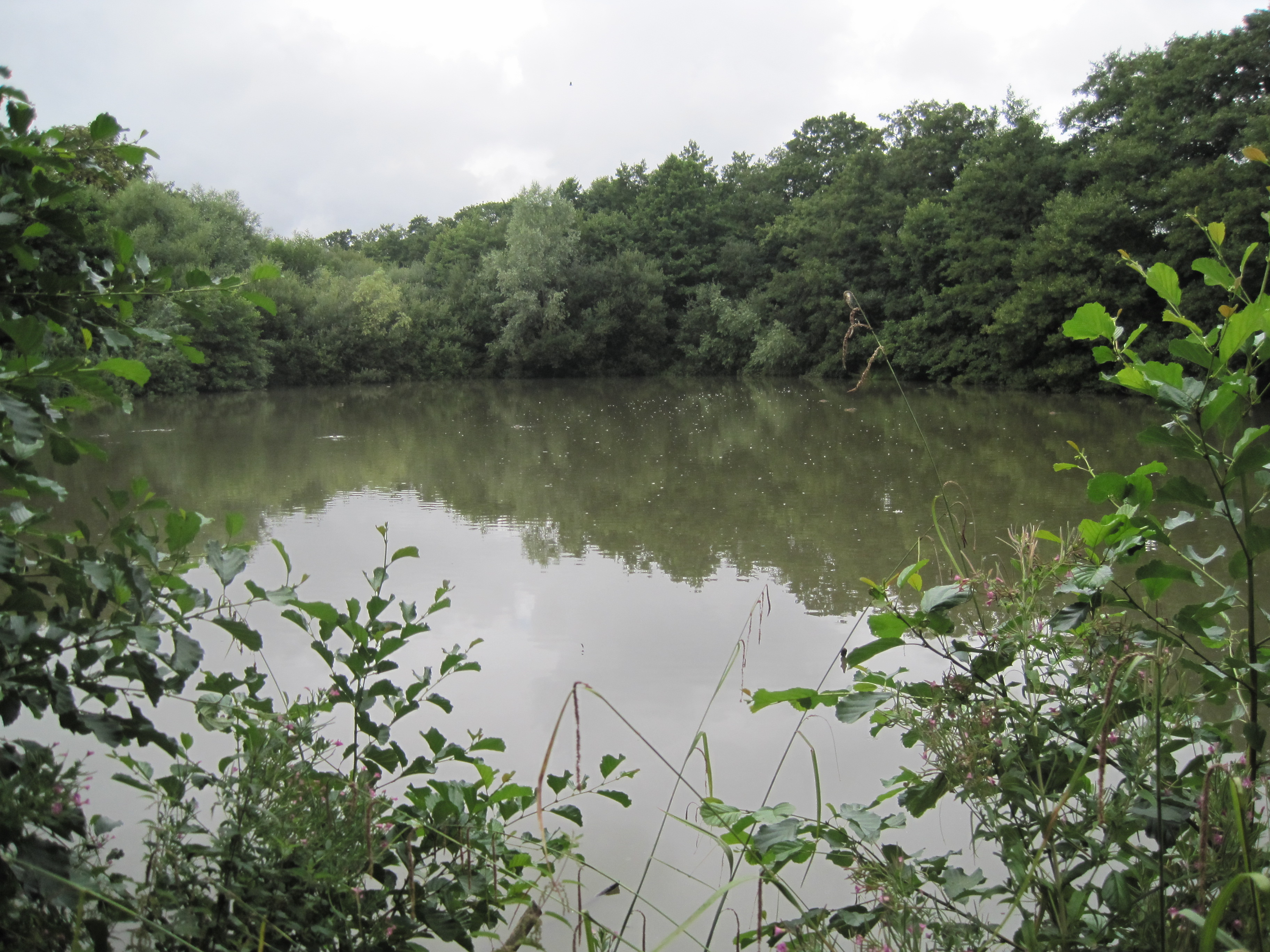
Darland's Lake

Totteridge is a residential area and former village in the London Borough of Barnet, England. It is a mixture of suburban development and open land (including some farmland) situated 8 miles (13 km) north north-west of Charing Cross. It is part of the Whetstone postal district (N20).

It gives its name to the St Andrew, Totteridge ecclesiastical parish of the Diocese of St Albans. It is part of the Totteridge and Woodside ward.

== History ==
Totteridge (parish) population
1881	657
1891	785
1901	844
1911	895
1921	801
1931	1,024
1941	war #
1951	4,500
# no census was held due to war
source: UK census

A map showing Totteridge parish in 1935.

This area was called Tataridge in the 13th century. It may have been named after someone called Tata. The ridge is the high ground between the valleys of the Dollis Brook and Folly Brook. Over the centuries the rural qualities of Totteridge have attracted well-to-do families. Cardinal Manning was born at Copped Hall in Totteridge in 1808. With the opening of the Great Northern Railway station in 1872, late-Victorian and Edwardian mansions were built around the old village. In line with overall trends in the late 1930s, following the conversion of the railway station (in operation from 1872 until 1941) into a London Underground station (from 1940) on the Northern line, smaller properties were built within walking distance of the station (Totteridge and Whetstone tube station). In 1968 much of Totteridge was designated a Conservation Area, and no major developments have taken place since then.

Totteridge was a detached part of the parish of Hatfield, Hertfordshire covering an area of 1,604 acres (6.49 km^{2}) and formed part of a narrow salient into Middlesex. It became part of Barnet Rural District and had a parish council from 1894 to 1914. It then formed part of Barnet Urban District from 1914 to 1965. On 1 April 1965, the parish and urban district were abolished by the London Government Act 1963 and the area was transferred from Hertfordshire to Greater London, to become part of the London Borough of Barnet. In 1901 the parish had a population of 844 and by 1951 it had risen to 4,500.

== Geography and landmarks ==
The boundary to the north and east is the Dollis Brook and the boundary to the south is that river's tributary, the Folly Brook. While these rivers define the area covered by the residents' association, the southern part of the area (with postcode N12 rather than N20) is often regarded as being in Woodside Park.

The main road is the A5109, which runs roughly east–west. The western part is called Totteridge Common, the next part is called Totteridge Village, the central part by the village green is called Totteridge Green, and the eastern part is called Totteridge Lane; the Lane continues into Whetstone, terminating at its junction with High Road, Whetstone (the A1000). At the western end of Totteridge Common is a set of traffic lights; the road to the north from these lights, Hendon Wood Lane, is just to the west of the western boundary.

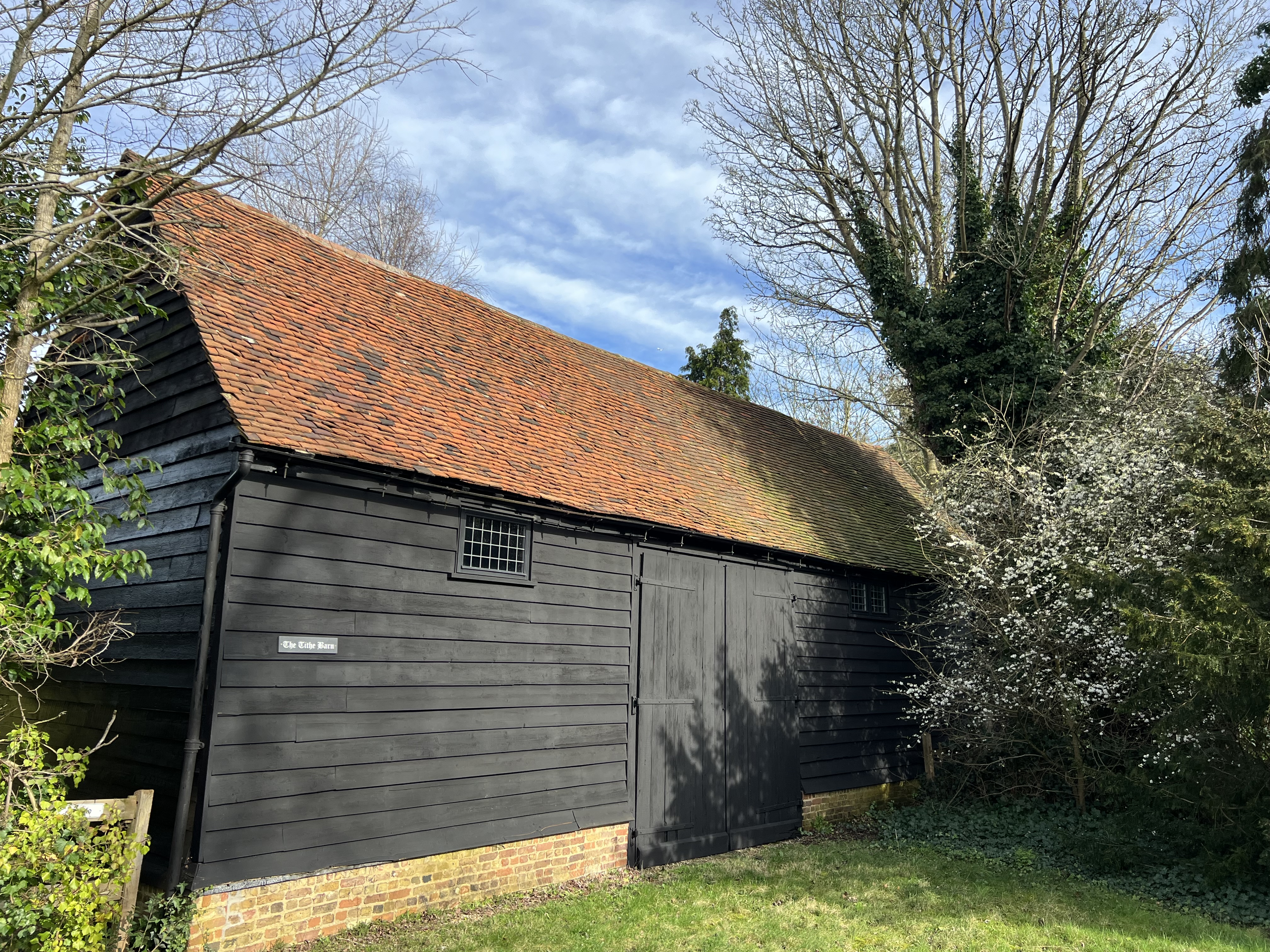
Former tithe barn in Totteridge

St. Andrew's Church stands on the ancient circle site, with a chapel known to have been located here from 1250. The rounded boundaries of the churchyard imply an underlying mote and ancient meeting place. The ancient yew tree in the churchyard is about 2,000 years old (as estimated by Kew Gardens experts) and is the oldest tree in London (also included in the book 100 Greatest Trees of London). The Tithe Barn and the adjacent animal pound (for lost and strayed livestock), now both part of the Pound House (built in 1907 by prominent Arts & Crafts architect J L Williams), date from the 17th and 16th centuries respectively. In 1790–1791, during the church renovation, all church services were conducted in the Tithe Barn. The West End House barn and Laurel Farm barn were built in the 17th century, and have now been converted into private houses. Timber-framed buildings from the Tudor era also include Willow House and Rose Cottage.

Several important local houses were demolished by developers between the two World Wars, including Copped Hall and Poynters Hall.

Totteridge has many spacious detached properties in a green setting; some of them are among the most expensive houses in London. Its past and present residents have included Arsène Wenger, Frankie Vaughan, Des O'Connor, Cliff Richard, Mickie Most, Hank Marvin, David Dein, Mike Ashley, Bruce Forsyth, David Ginola, and Lord Levy. More modest housing, much of it semi-detached, predominates at the eastern end of Totteridge.

== Transport ==
=== Buses ===
Transport for London bus route 251 towards Edgware bus/tube station (westbound), or towards Arnos Grove tube station (eastbound), passes through Totteridge Village along the A5109.

Route 326 towards Barnet (the Spires), or towards Brent Cross Shopping Centre, skirts the eastern fringe of the area, operating a service along the eastern section of Totteridge Lane, and a hail and ride service along Longland Drive.

=== Tube station ===
The nearest tube station is Totteridge and Whetstone on the Northern line. Both bus routes 251 and 326 stop outside the station, on either side of Totteridge Lane. Woodside Park tube station, also on the Northern Line, is on the south-eastern edge of Totteridge, bordering North Finchley.

=== Railway station ===
Nearby:

- Oakleigh Park – Greater Thameslink Railway (383 bus)

== Demography ==
Totteridge compared
2001 UK Census	Totteridge ward	Barnet borough	England'
Population	14,449	314,564	49,138,831
Foreign born	30.7%	30.5%	9.2%
White	75.0%	74.0%	90.9%
Asian	14.0%	14.4%	4.6%
Black	2.6%	6.0%	2.3%
Christian	47.2%	47.3%	71.7%
Jewish	16.7%	14.8%	0.5%
Muslim	4.5%	6.2%	3.1%
Hindu	5.6%	6.7%	1.1%
No religion	12.5%	12.8%	14.6%
Unemployed	2.3%	3.4%	3.3%
Retired	11.1%	10.1%	13.5%

At the 2001 UK census, the Totteridge electoral ward had a population of 14,449. The ethnicity was 75% white, 2.5% mixed race, 14% Asian, 2.6% black and 5.9% other. The place of birth of residents was 69.3% United Kingdom, 1.8% Republic of Ireland, 4.2% other Western European countries, and 24.7% elsewhere. Religion was recorded as 47.2% Christian, 2.5% Buddhist, 5.6% Hindu, 0.6% Sikh, 16.7% Jewish, and 4.5% Muslim. 12.5% were recorded as having no religion, 1.8% had an alternative religion and 8.7% did not state their religion.

The economic activity of residents aged 16–74 was 38.3% in full-time employment, 9.9% in part-time employment, 14.7% self-employed, 2.3% unemployed, 1.9% students with jobs, 7.6% students without jobs, 11.1% retired, 8.8% looking after home or family, 2% permanently sick or disabled and 3.4% economically inactive for other reasons. The industry of employment of residents was 15.1% retail, 6.9% manufacturing, 3.2% construction, 23.2% real estate, 9.8% health and social work, 8.9% education, 6% transport and communications, 6.9% public administration, 3.5% hotels and restaurants, 8.5% finance, 0.4% agriculture and 7.6% other. Compared with national figures, the ward had a relatively high proportion of workers in finance and real estate. According to Office for National Statistics estimates, during the period of April 2001 to March 2002 the average gross weekly income of households was £880, compared with an average of £660 in South East England. Of the ward's residents aged 16–74, 39.2% had a higher education qualification or the equivalent, compared with 19.9% nationwide.

In the 2011 census, the population of Totteridge ward was 15,159. 66% of the population was white (49% British, 15% Other, 2% Irish), 10% Indian and 8% Other Asian. 40% of the population adhered to Christianity, 17% were irreligious and 16% were Jewish.

== Sport and leisure ==
Totteridge Millhillians Cricket Club, formed by the merger of Totteridge Cricket Club and Old Millhillians Cricket Club over the winter of 2007/2008, forms a central part of the local community. Located just off Totteridge Green, it fields 4 teams in the Saracens Hertfordshire Cricket League, as well as a Ladies team, a Sunday XI and a Colts section for future players, which consists of the U15 Tornadoes, U13 Warriors and the U11 Sharks.

== Nature reserves ==
The area has a number of Sites of Importance for Nature Conservation: Darland's Lake Nature Reserve, Totteridge Green, Totteridge Common, Totteridge Fields, Dollis Brook, Folly Brook and Totteridge Croft Field (or Dell's Down Acre).

== Nearest tube stations ==
- Totteridge and Whetstone tube station

== Politics and government ==
Totteridge is covered by the Chipping Barnet constituency for elections to the House of Commons of the United Kingdom.

Totteridge is covered by the Totteridge and Woodside ward for elections to Barnet London Borough Council.

== Notable residents ==
- Mike Ashley, businessman and former owner of Newcastle United FC
- Sean Bean, actor
- David Dein, former Vice-Chairman of Arsenal FC, Premier League Ambassador
- The Beverley Sisters, three sisters, members of pop vocal group
- Edward Bulwer-Lytton, novelist and parliamentarian
- Bruce Forsyth, entertainer and TV presenter
- David Ginola, footballer
- Gordon Hewart, 1st Viscount Hewart, Lord Chief Justice of England
- Verity Lambert, producer
- Lord Levy, Labour party fundraiser
- Henry Edward Manning, cardinal and head of Catholic Church of England
- William Manning, governor of the Bank of England
- Hank Marvin, guitarist for the Shadows
- Peter Meyer, merchant
- Roger Moore, actor and James Bond 007 star
- Des O'Connor, singer and TV presenter
- Cliff Richard, singer and actor
- Frankie Vaughan, actor and singer
- Arsène Wenger, former Arsenal FC manager
- Fiammetta Wilson, astronomer
