= Hales (disambiguation) =

Hales may refer to:

- Hale's, a.k.a. Hale Bros. Co., a former department store chain in Northern California, United States
- Hale's a.k.a. J. M. Hale Co., a former Los Angeles department store, United States

== Places ==
- Hales, Norfolk, England, United Kingdom
- Hales, Staffordshire, England, United Kingdom
- Haleş, a village in Tisău Commune, Buzău County, Romania
- Hales Creek, Ohio, United States
- Norton in Hales, Shropshire, England

== People ==
- Hales (king) (379 BC), of Triballi

== See also ==
- Hales (surname)
- Hailes (disambiguation)
- Thales
