= Hales (surname) =

Hales is a surname. Notable people with the surname include

- Alejandro Hales (1923–2001), Chilean politician
- Alex Hales (born 1989), English cricketer
- Alfred W. Hales (born 1938), American mathematician
- Charles Nicholas Hales (1935–2005), English physician
- Derek Hales (born 1951), English footballer
- Everett Hales (1876–1947), New Zealand cricketer
- E. E. Y. Hales (1908–1986), English historian
- James Hales (c. 1500–1554), English judge, son of John Hales (died 1540)
- Jeff Hales, American politician
- John Hales (disambiguation), any of various people of this name
- Laura Harris Hales (1967–2022), American historian and writer
- Robert Hales (disambiguation) any of various people of this name
- R. Stanton Hales (born 1942), American mathematician and educator
- Samuel Hales (1615–1693), founding settler of Hartford and Norwalk, Connecticut
- Skylar Hales (born 2001), American baseball player
- Stephen Hales (1677–1761), English physiologist, chemist and inventor
- Thomas Hales (disambiguation), any of various people of this name
- Hales, a Triballi king

== Hayls ==
- John Hayls

== See also ==
- Hales
- Hayles
- Hale (disambiguation)
- Hale's Ales, A Washington-based craft brewery
