= Hale =

Hale may refer to:

== Places ==
=== Australia ===
- Hale, Northern Territory, a locality
- Hale River, in southeastern Northern Territory

=== United Kingdom ===
- Hale, Cumbria, a hamlet near Beetham, Cumbria
- Hale, Greater Manchester, a village in the Metropolitan Borough of Trafford, Greater Manchester
  - Hale (2023 Trafford ward), a current electoral ward in the Metropolitan Borough of Trafford, Greater Manchester
  - Hale (1974 Trafford ward), a former electoral ward in the Metropolitan Borough of Trafford, Greater Manchester
- Hale, Halton, a village in Halton, Cheshire
  - Hale, an electoral ward in the Borough of Halton, Cheshire
- Hale, Hampshire, a village in the New Forest
- Hale, Surrey, a village near Farnham
- Great Hale, a village in the North Kesteven district of Lincolnshire
- Little Hale, a hamlet in the North Kesteven district of Lincolnshire
- Tottenham Hale, a district in the London Borough of Haringey
- The Hale, an area of the London Borough of Barnet
  - Hale, an electoral ward in the London Borough of Barnet
- The Hale, Buckinghamshire, a hamlet near Wendover
- Hale Common, also just called Hale, a hamlet on the Isle of Wight

=== United States ===
- Hale, Colorado, an unincorporated community in Yuma County, Colorado
- Hale, Iowa, an unincorporated community in Jones County, Iowa
- Hale, Kansas, an unincorporated community in Salt Creek Township, Chautauqua County, Kansas
- Hale (Massachusetts), an educational and recreation organization in Westwood, Massachusetts
- Hale, Michigan, an unincorporated community in Iosco County, Michigan
- Hale, Missouri, a city in Carroll County, Missouri
- Hale, Utah, a ghost town in Carbon County, Utah
- Hale, Wisconsin, a town in Trempealeau County, Wisconsin
  - Hale (community), Wisconsin, an unincorporated community in the town of Hale
- Hale, Minneapolis, a neighborhood near the southern edge of Minneapolis
- Mount Hale (New Hampshire), a mountain located in Grafton County, New Hampshire
- Hale County, Alabama
- Hale County, Texas

=== Poland ===
- Hałe, a village in Gmina Sokółka, Sokółka County, Podlaskie Voivodeship

=== Tanzania ===
- Hale, Tanzania, a town in Korogwe district

== Astronomy and space ==
- Hale Telescope, 200-inch (5.1 m) telescope at Palomar Observatory in California
- 60-inch Hale, a 60-inch (1.5 m) telescope at Mount Wilson Observatory in California
- Hale (lunar crater), a crater on the Moon
- Hale (Martian crater), a crater on Mars
- Hale's law, a law in solar physics

== People ==
- Hale (given name), includes a list of people with given name Hale
- Hale (surname), includes a list of people with surname Hale

== Other uses ==
- Hale (band), alternative rock band in the Philippines
  - Hale (album), by the band Hale
- High-altitude long endurance (HALE), a type of air-borne vehicle
- Healthy life expectancy (HALE), a World Health Organization statistic for life expectancy
- Hale School, an independent boys' school in Perth, Western Australia
- Camp Hale, a former U.S. Army training facility in Colorado
- Hawaiian hale, Hawaiian architectural style

== See also ==
- HALE (disambiguation)
- The Hale (disambiguation)
- Hale High School (disambiguation)
- Hales, a small village in Norfolk, England
- Hales Corners, Wisconsin a village in Milwaukee County, Wisconsin, U.S.
- Hales (surname)
- Halle (disambiguation)
- Hayle, a small town in Cornwall, England
- McHale (surname)
- Honolulu Hale, the official seat of government of the city and county of Honolulu, Hawaii
- Hale's Ales, a brewery in Seattle, Washington, U.S.
