= On the Abundance of Laws =

On the Abundance of Laws (in Greek: Περί πολυνομίας) is an excerpt from Isocrates' Areopagiticus, where he argues that an abundance of laws is not a sign of good governance, but rather an indication of mismanagement. Central to his argument is the belief that shaping citizens' character is more crucial than proliferating laws.

== Key arguments ==
He argues that what is essential is the shaping of the citizens' character: "(...) Moreover, the multitudes and complexities of laws are a sign of poor management of the city; for by making themselves barriers against wrongdoings, many laws are necessitated to be established. Those who govern rightly should not fill the porticoes with written laws, but rather hold justice in their souls; for cities are well-governed not by decrees but by the characters of their citizens, and those poorly raised and strictly adherent to the laws will dare to transgress, while those well-educated will willingly adhere to even the simplest laws."

== Comparative analysis ==
This perspective is also reflected in another of his works, On The Peace, where he critiques the Triballians and the Lycanians for their legal approach, noting that despite having numerous laws, these societies show little regard for them. Isocrates' viewpoint finds resonance in the words of Tacitus in Annals (Latin: Annales), who famously remarked, Corruptissima republica plurimae leges ("The most corrupt state has many laws").

Isocrates' stance aligns with that of Plato, who similarly opposed the proliferation of laws. Plato believed that existing laws, rather than shaping citizens' ethical perceptions and behaviors, merely enforced compliance through the threat of punishment. He advocated for a focus on primary ethical standards and unwritten laws as the foundation of good governance.

Dionysius of Halicarnassus highlights this passage for its symmetry:

"Then the number and the precision of the laws are a sign that this city is poorly governed; for making themselves barriers of transgressions, they are forced to enact many laws. But those who govern properly should not fill the stoas with writings, but have justice in their souls; for cities are well governed not by decrees, but by customs, and the poorly brought up and precisely written laws will dare to transgress, whereas the well-educated and the simply laid down laws will willingly persist."

"The large number and exactness of laws show that this city is not well governed, for there is a need to enact many laws that act as a barrier to lawlessness. They believed that those who govern rightly do not need to fill the porticos with written laws, but rather to have the concept of justice in their souls, because cities are well governed based on the character of the citizens and not by numerous decrees; citizens with poor upbringing will dare to transgress even the most precise laws, while well-educated citizens will voluntarily comply with even the simply existing laws."
