= Tribalia =

Tribalia or Triballia may refer to:

- The homeland of the Triballi, an ancient Thracian tribe that lived in modern Bulgaria, North Macedonia and Serbia
- An exonym formerly used for modern Serbia
- The Timok Valley, sometimes referred to as "Tribalia" in Romania
