= Syrmus =

King of the Triballi, opponent of Alexander the Great

Syrmus or Syrmos (also Syrmios, Ancient Greek: Σύρμος) was a king of the West Thracian Triballi tribe during the 330s BC.

He is mentioned by Arrian, Strabo and Plutarch.

After the death of his father, Philip II, Alexander the Great passed through the lands of the Odrysians in 335-334 BC, crossing the Haemus ranges and after three encounters (including the Battle of Haemus) defeated and drove the Triballians to the junction of the Lyginus at the Danube. Around 3,000 Triballi were killed, the rest fled. Syrmos and his people took refuge on the Danubian island of Peukê where the remnants of defeated Thracians were gathered. The successful Macedonian attacks terrorized the tribes around the Danube, so the autonomous Thracian tribes sent tributes to Alexander seeking peace. Alexander was satisfied with his victories and accepted peace so he could focus on the battles ahead in Asia.

Though Syrmus was later considered the eponymous founder of Sirmium, the roots are different, and the two words only became conflated later.

== See also ==
- List of Thracian tribes
- Hales, a predecessor

== Sources ==
- Papazoglu, Fanula (1978). The Central Balkan Tribes in pre-Roman Times: Triballi, Autariatae, Dardanians, Scordisci and Moesians. Amsterdam: Hakkert. ISBN 9789025607937.

Regnal titles
Preceded by Hales	King of the Triballi; 330s BC	Succeeded by ?
