= The Hale (disambiguation) =

The Hale may refer to:

- The Hale, Barnet, London, England
- The Hale, Buckinghamshire, Wendover, Buckinghamshire, England

== See also ==
- Hale (disambiguation)
- Hale Telescope
