= London Buses route 240 =

London bus route

240
- Metroline BYD BD11B in Golders Green in October 2026

Overview
- Operator: Metroline
- Garage: Edgware
- Vehicle: BYD BD11B

Route
- Start: Edgware bus station
- Via: Mill Hill; Hendon
- End: Golders Green station

London Buses route 240 is a Transport for London contracted bus route in London, England. Running between Edgware bus station and Golders Green station, it is operated by Metroline.

== History ==
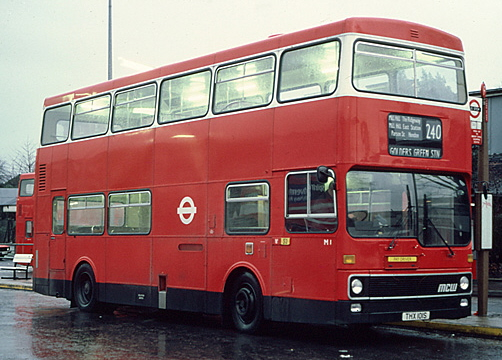
MCW Metrobus at Golders Green station in January 1981

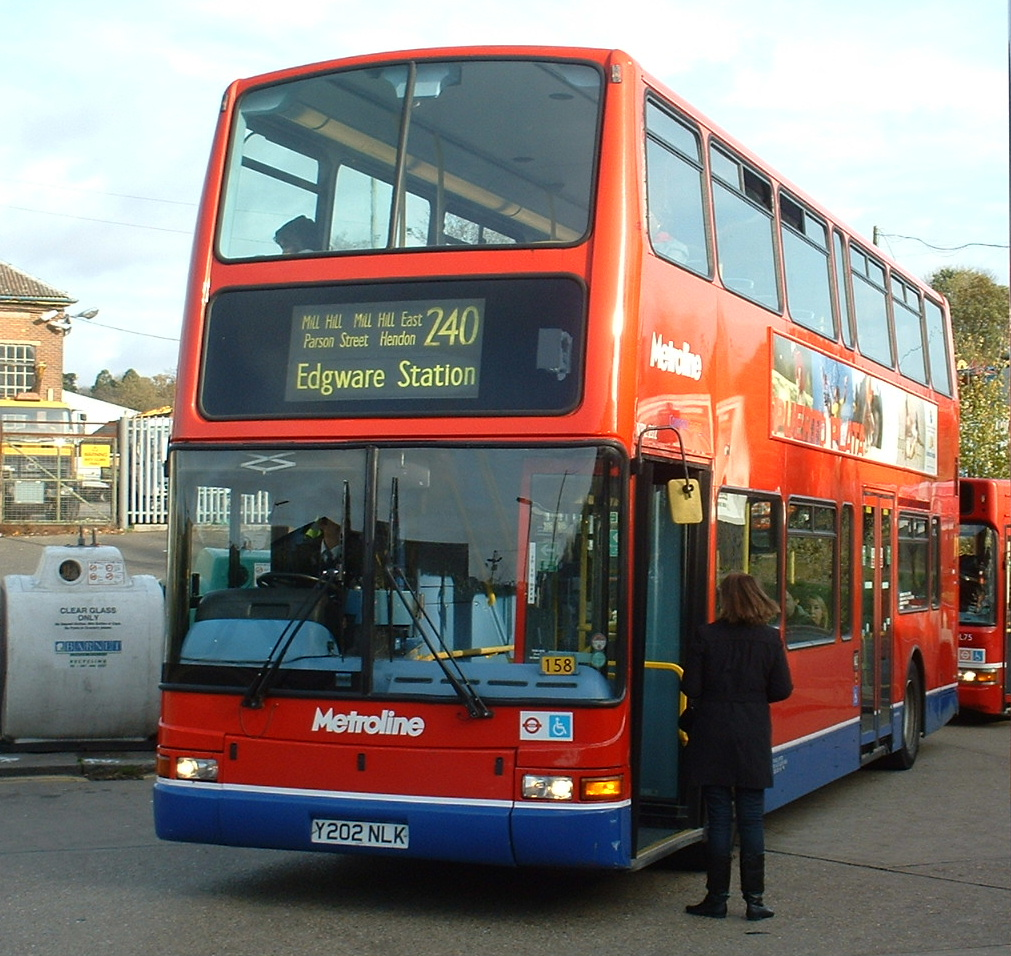
Metroline Plaxton President bodied Volvo B7TL at Mill Hill East station in November 2007

Route 240 was introduced in the 1930s between Golders Green and Edgware stations and replaced the former London General Omnibus Company route 104. The only single-decker version of the LS (London Six) type bus ran on route 240.

Upon being re-tendered, the route was retained by Metroline with a new contract commencing on 30 April 2005.

Route 240 was retained by Metroline on 18 August 2011.

== Current route ==
Route 240 operates via these primary locations:

- Edgware bus station
- Edgware station
- Edgware The Hale
- Mill Hill Broadway station
- Mill Hill Village
- Mill Hill East station
- Hendon
- Golders Green station
