= HALE =

HALE may refer to:

- Healthy life expectancy, statistics defined as the average number of years that a person can expect to live in "full health"
- High-altitude long endurance, a description of an air-borne vehicle which functions optimally at high-altitude

== See also ==
- Hale (disambiguation)
