= Hayles =

Hayles is a surname, and may refer to:

- Andrew Hayles, American basketball player
- Barry Hayles, English-born Jamaican football coach and former player
- Brian Hayles, English television and film writer
- John Hayles, Tudor agrarian reformer (more commonly Hales)
- Ian Hayles (born 1972), Jamaican politician
- N. Katherine Hayles, American literary critic and theorist
- Rob Hayles, English cyclist
- Eustace Robert Hayles. Australian entrepreneur
- Percy Hayles, Jamaican boxer of the 1950s, 1960s and 1970s
- Shania Hayles, Jamaican footballer

== See also ==
- Hales (surname)
- Heyl (surname)
