= Arrandene Open Space and Featherstone Hill =

Local nature reserve in Barnet, London, England

Coordinates: 51.613°N 0.230°W

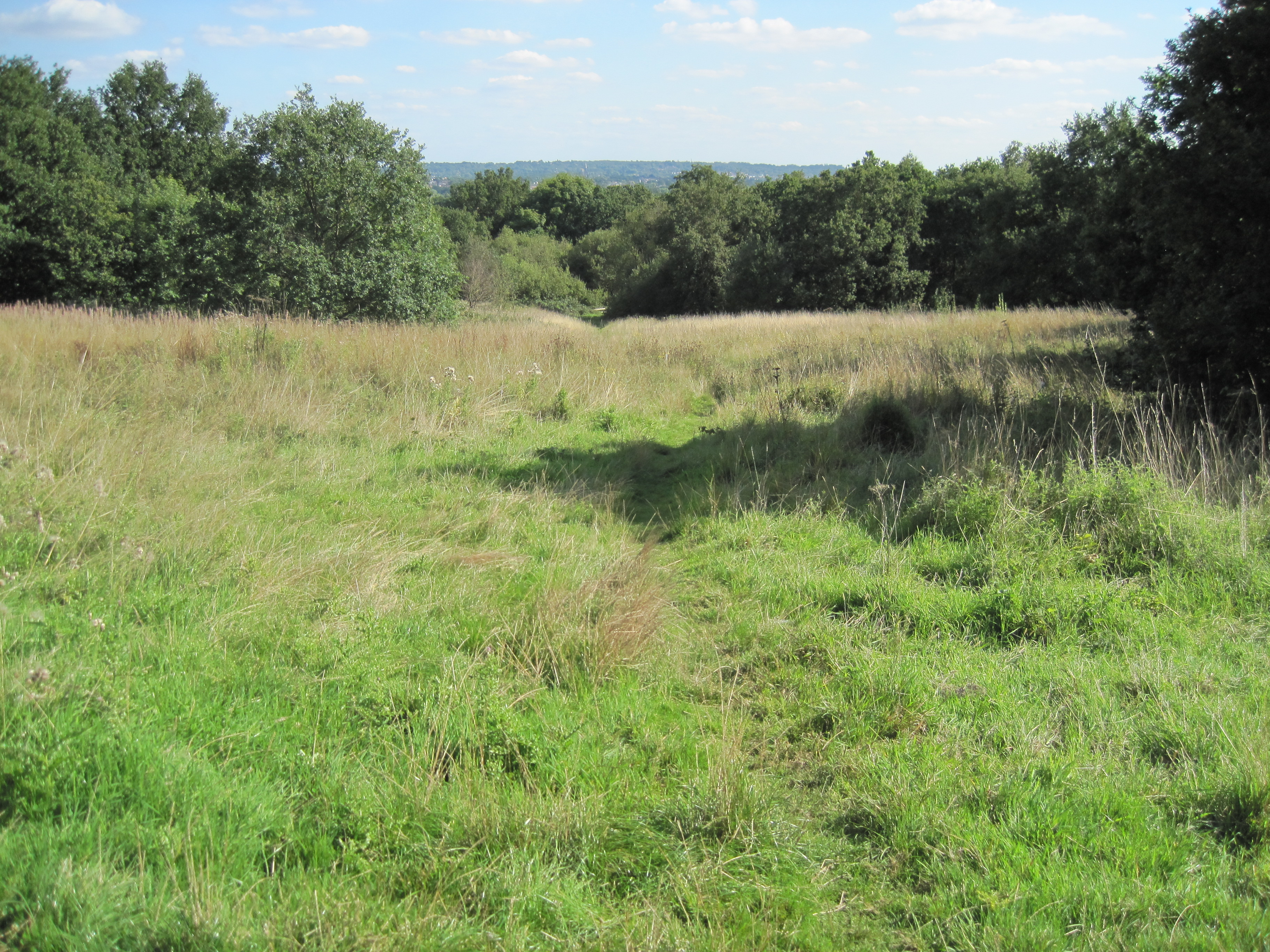
Arrandene Open Space

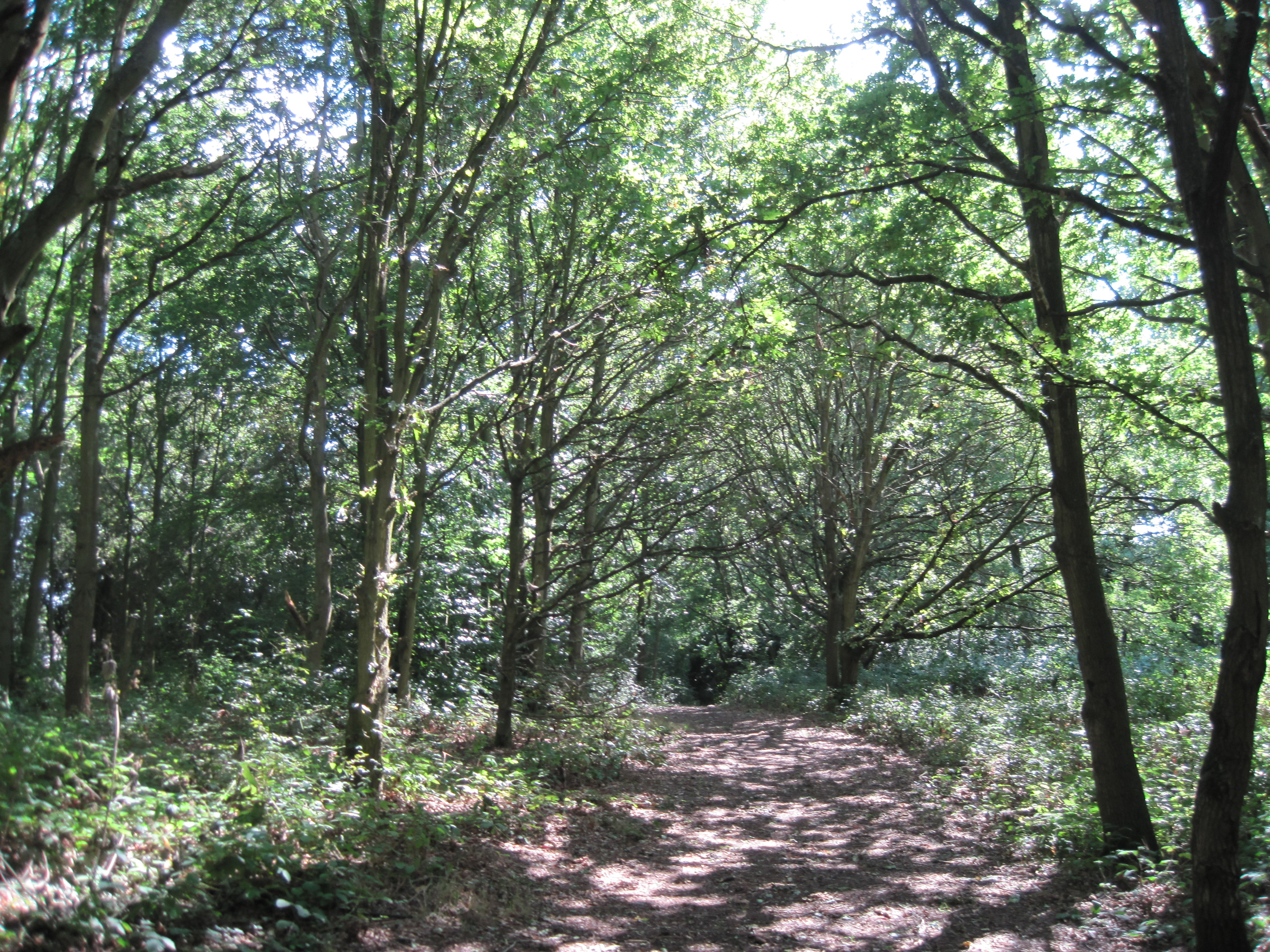
Featherstone Hill

Arrandene Open Space and Featherstone Hill is a 25 hectare Site of Metropolitan Importance for Nature Conservation in Mill Hill in the London Borough of Barnet.

Arrandene Open Space is a large area of pasture divided by ancient hedgerows, and it is one of London's rare traditionally managed old hay meadows. It contains numerous uncommon plant species characteristic of unimproved grassland, such as greater bird's-foot trefoil, common knapweed and ox-eye daisy.

Trees include the uncommon wild service tree, and breeding birds include spotted flycatcher, lesser whitethroat, reed bunting and skylark. Featherstone Hill is a partly wooded hill in the south west of the site.

It was purchased by Hendon Council in 1929 to preserve it for public recreation at a time when the area was rapidly developing.

There is free public access to the site, which has a network of public footpaths and a bridleway. There are entrances in Wise Lane, Milespit Hill and Wills Grove.

== See also ==
- Nature reserves in Barnet
- Barnet parks and open spaces
