= Thomas Hale =

Thomas Hale may refer to:

- Thomas Hale (agriculturist) (died 1759), British writer on agriculture
- Thomas Hale (cricketer) (1829–1899), English cricketer
- Thomas Egerton Hale (1832–1909), English surgeon major and recipient of the Victoria Cross
- Thomas Hale Jr. (born 1937), American physician and author

== See also ==
- Thomas Hales (disambiguation)
