= Hailes =

Hailes may refer to:

== Places ==
- Hailes, Gloucestershire, England, the location of Hailes Abbey
- Hailes Castle, the castle in East Lothian, Scotland
- Hailles, a commune in the Picardy region of France
- Wester Hailes, Edinburgh, Scotland

== People ==
- Nathaniel Hailes (1802–1879), early settler in South Australia
- Patrick Hepburn, 1st Lord Hailes
- Patrick Hepburn, 1st Earl of Bothwell, 2nd Lord Hailes
- Patrick Buchan-Hepburn, 1st Baron Hailes
- Sir David Dalrymple, 1st Baronet of Hailes
- Sir James Dalrymple, 2nd Baronet of Hailes
- Sir David Dalrymple, 3rd Baronet, Lord Hailes
- Adam Hepburn, Master of Hailes
- Lady Hailes

== Other ==
- Hailes (ball game) is a Scottish ball game
- Hailes Halt railway station, a former station near Edinburgh
- Lordship and Barony of Hailes, a Scottish feudal lordship
