= Mill Hill =

Suburb in London, England

Coordinates: 51.62°N 0.23°W

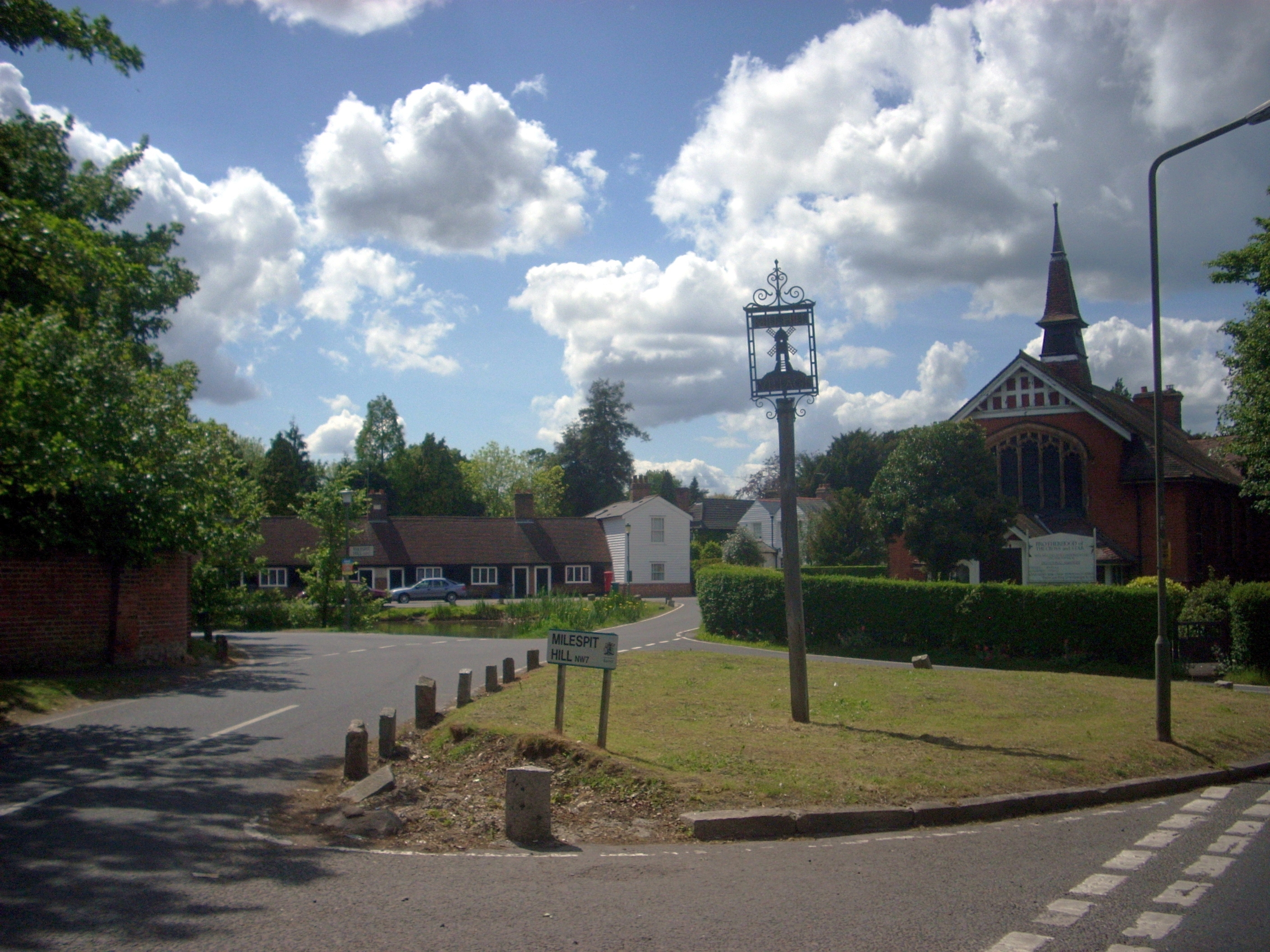
- A sign marking Mill Hill Village

- Location within Greater London
- Population: 18,451 (2011 Census, ward)
- OS grid reference: TQ225925
  - Charing Cross: 9 mi (14.5 km) SSE
- London borough: Barnet
- Ceremonial county: Greater London
- Region: London
- Country: England
- Sovereign state: United Kingdom
- Post town: LONDON
- Postcode district: NW7
- Dialling code: 020
- Police: Metropolitan
- Fire: London
- Ambulance: London
- UK Parliament: Hendon
- London Assembly: Barnet and Camden

Mill Hill is a suburb in the London Borough of Barnet, England. It is situated around 9 miles (14 km) northwest of Charing Cross, close to the Hertfordshire border. It was in the historic county of Middlesex until 1965, when it became part of Greater London. Its population was 18,451 in 2011.

It consists of the original Mill Hill Village; the later-developed Mill Hill Broadway (now the area's main hub); and Mill Hill East, alongside large swathes of countryside. A further area at the western edge of the suburb, The Hale, is on the borders of Mill Hill and Edgware, and is partly in each.

== History ==
The area's name was first recorded as Myllehill in 1547 and appears to mean "hill with a windmill". However, the workings of the original Mill are in the building adjacent to The Mill Field.

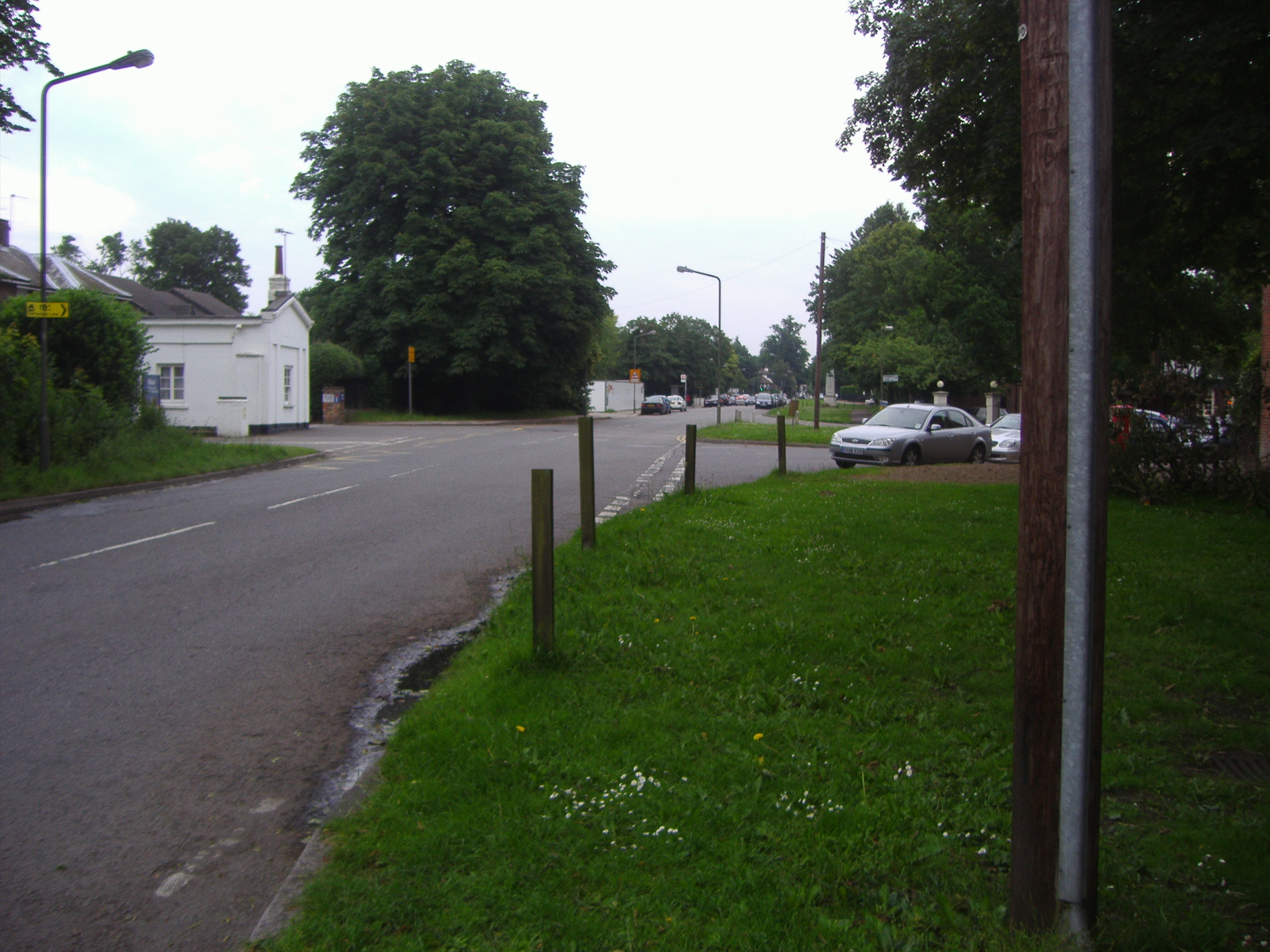
Part of The Ridgeway today

Mill Hill Village is the oldest known inhabited part of the district, a ribbon development along a medieval route called 'The Ridgeway'. It is thought that the name 'Mill Hill' may be derived from a mill on The Ridgeway, built on an area of open ground (now a park) known as The Mill Field. The village is bounded on the north and the south by Green Belt land, and its High Street, at 100 yards, is the shortest in London.

The area's proximity to the city made it popular as a country retreat from the 17th century onwards, and large houses and quaint cottages survive. William Wilberforce (MP, and abolitionist of the slave trade) and Sir Stamford Raffles (founder of colonial Singapore) both briefly resided here, the former being the patron of Mill Hill's first church, Saint Paul's. As late as 1960, five shops existed in the Village (Griffin's sub-Post Office, The Blenheim Steps, Cook & Son [sweets and groceries], Hawes Brothers [grocers] and Vincett's [butchers]) but although the buildings survive, they have all since been converted into private houses, as the retail focus in the area shifted to Mill Hill Broadway.

=== Military ===
Inglis Barracks at Mill Hill East was home to the Middlesex Regiment between 1905 and 1966. The 1941 reopening of the railway station, under wartime conditions, was to allow easy access to the barracks.

Situated along Partingdale Lane is Seafield House. Now converted into a private home, it was originally designed and operated as a secret nuclear bunker to house and protect the 'London North Group' emergency regional government between about 1951 and 1985.

== Governance ==
Mill Hill was part of the ancient civil parish of Hendon within the historic county boundaries of Middlesex. Mill Hill as part of Municipal Borough of Hendon was merged into the London Borough of Barnet in Greater London in 1965. The Mill Hill ward is one of 21 electoral wards in the borough. This ward has 3 out of the 63 seats on the Barnet Council.

Mill Hill was in the parliamentary constituency of Hendon which was created in 1918. This lasted until 1945 when the constituency was split in two, Mill Hill in Hendon North. In 1997, the Hendon constituency was recreated. From then, until he lost his seat to the Conservative candidate, Matthew Offord, at the 2010 general election, Hendon was represented in the House of Commons by Andrew Dismore of the Labour Party.

== Geography ==
Mill Hill's postal address is London NW7 (which also covers Highwood Hill and part of Arkley).

=== Mill Hill Village ===
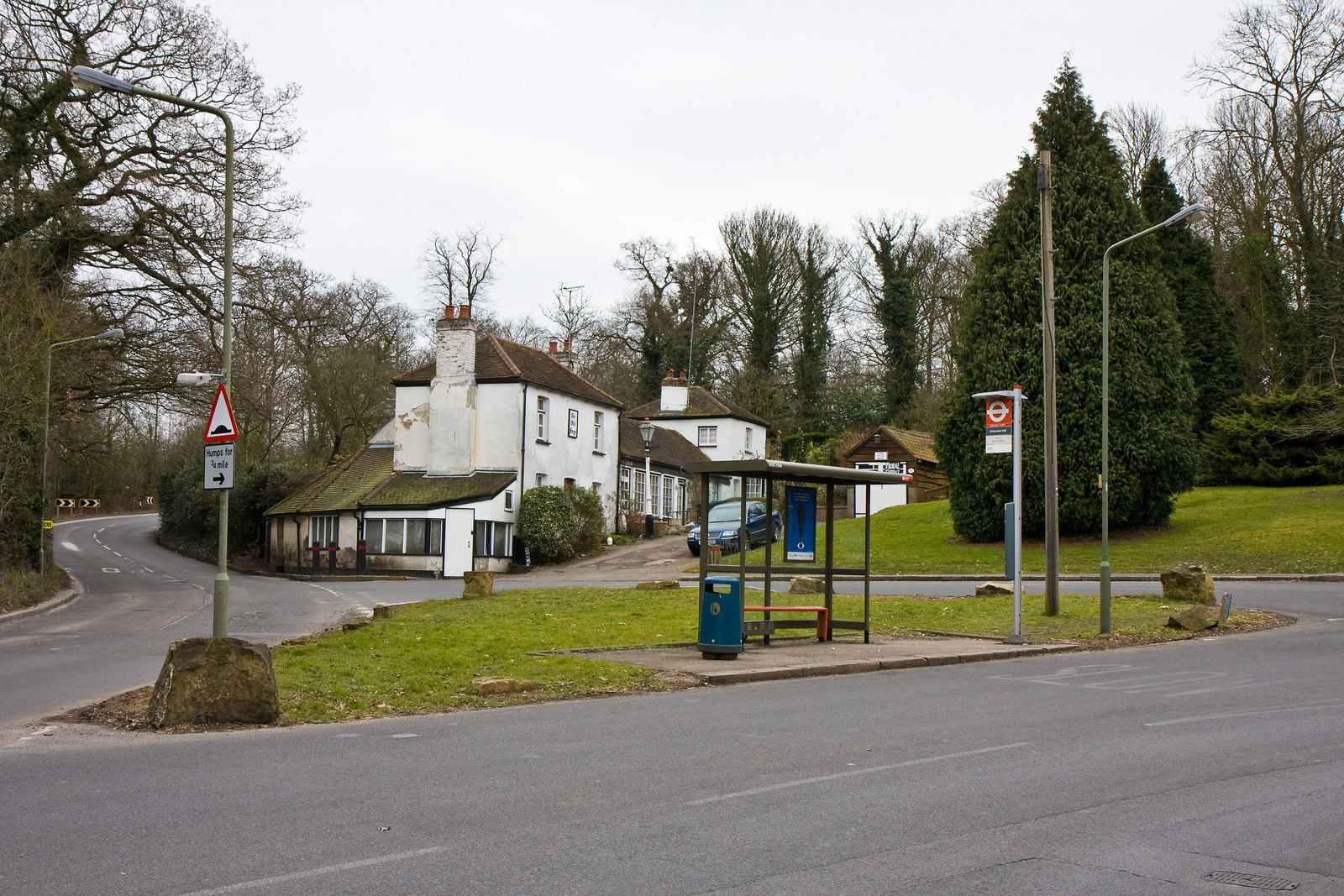
Triangular junction by The Old Forge in Highwood Hill

The village is a ribbon development along The Ridgeway. It has green belt in either side.

"Partingdale" and "Burtonhole" form a valley north of The Ridgeway. North is Folly Farm and Folly Brook, a tributary of the Dollis Brook, running west to east. Between The Ridgeway and Folly Brook are Burtonhole Farm, a garden centre called Finchley Nurseries, and several sports grounds.

The National Institute for Medical Research, a landmark building, was demolished in 2018 and the site is being developed for new houses and apartments. On 1 April 2015, the NIMR became part of the new Francis Crick Institute and ceased to exist as a separate MRC institute. The site was fully vacated and closed for redevelopment in 2017.

Arrandene Open Space and Featherstone Hill is a large open space which is bordered by Wise Lane, Wills Grove, Milespit Hill and The Ridgeway. While there are many open spaces in the area, Arrandene is unique because of its many open fields, meadows and woodland. The open fields were originally hay meadows which provided feed for the horses pulling carriages north to Barnet and beyond.

On Milespit Hill is the non-denominational Mill Hill Cemetery, formerly known as "Paddington New Cemetery". The 1960s pop singer Billy Fury (Ronald Wycherley, 1940–83) is buried there. The cemetery also has two Commonwealth War Graves Commission sections of Second World War graves. One has the graves of 53 United Kingdom personnel, and has a Cross of Sacrifice. The other has the graves of 254 Dutch personnel, 212 of whom were merchant navy. Many were originally buried elsewhere in the UK, but were reburied here as a Dutch "Field of Honour".

Southwest of Mill Hill Village is a small suburb called "Poets' Corner", and to the north an old estate, now a nature reserve, Moat Mount Open Space.

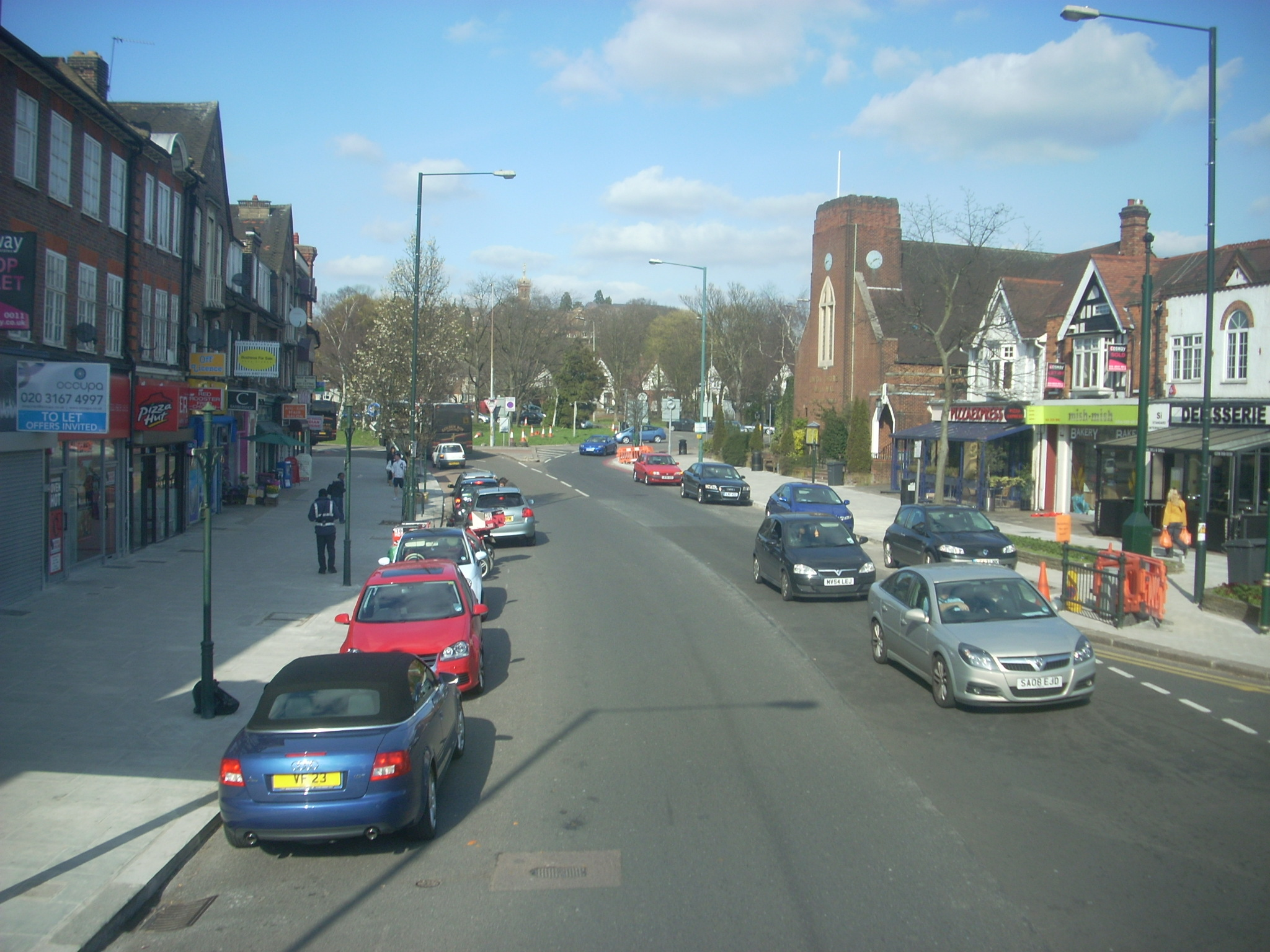
Mill Hill Broadway towards Mill Hill Circus

=== Mill Hill Broadway ===
The modern-day centre of Mill Hill is at Mill Hill Broadway, previously known as Lawrence Street. This is a suburban district which developed from the 1890s onwards, and especially in the early part of the 20th century, after the arrival of the Midland Railway station in 1868. The Broadway itself is now an important local retail area with numerous shops and cafes and transport links.

=== Mill Hill East ===
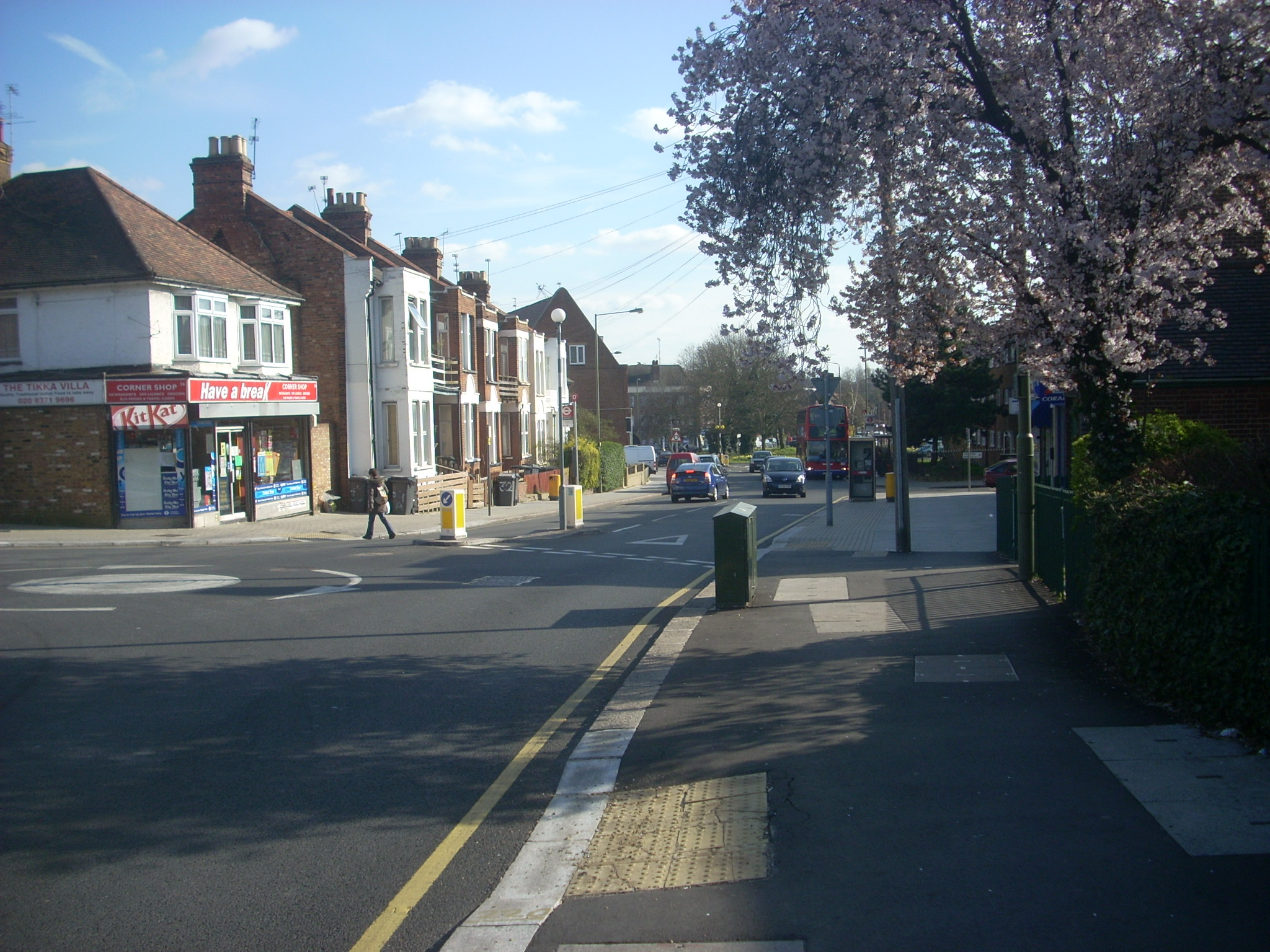
Bittacy Hill looking towards Holders Hill Circus

Parts of the east side of Mill Hill have been redeveloped, with the former gas works replaced by a Waitrose supermarket and housing developments. The small local retail area at Mill Hill East is at "Kelly's Corner" (officially Holders Hill Circus) east of the station. South of Mill Hill East are Copthall and Holders Hill.

The United Kingdom / Carl Zeiss / Bausch & Lomb Optical Works was established at the top of Bittacy Hill in 1912 and demolished about 1990, to be replaced by a large building owned by the Jehovah's Witnesses, to complement their nearby Watchtower House built on the site of the former Bittacy House.

== Demography ==
Mill Hill electoral ward of Barnet has a population of 18,451 as of the 2011 UK Census. The census also showed that ethnically, 64% of the population is White (49% White British, 13% Other White, 2% Irish). The largest minorities were the 7% identifying themselves as Indian, 6% as Other Asian, and 6% as Black African. On religion, 39% identified as Christian, 19% Jewish, 14% no religion, 12% Muslim, 5% Hindu, 2% other religion and 8% religion not stated. The most spoken foreign language was Persian. The majority of the 6,875 households are tenure owned. The vast majority (4,602) of the properties are in the "whole house or bungalow" category, of which most are semi-detached. 4.1% of economically active people were unemployed. The median age was 35.

== Transport ==
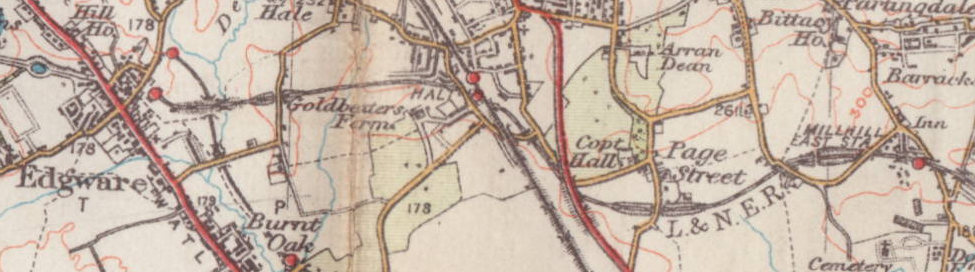
1930 OS map, showing Mill Hill to the east and in the centre, and Edgware to the west. The east-west railway line west of Mill Hill East station, on the right, was completely closed in 1964, and some sections of the track bed have since been built on. Inglis Barracks is at the top right.

=== Tube and rail ===
Stations in the area are:

- Mill Hill Broadway (Thameslink)
- Mill Hill East (Northern line)

There was also another smaller station, Mill Hill (The Hale), opened by the Edgware, Highgate and London Railway in 1867. Passenger services ended in 1939, and freight traffic in 1964.

The branch was opened in 1867 as part of the Edgware, Highgate and London Railway, which also built Dollis Brook Viaduct east of the station. It used to continue west to Edgware and east to the Great Northern main line at Finsbury Park station, following the present Northern line route as far as Highgate.

In 1935, as part of the London Transport New Works Programme, plans were announced to modernise and electrify the railway and transfer it to the London Underground. Work was started, and steam passenger services between Edgware and Finchley Central were withdrawn in September 1939 to facilitate it. However, the Second World War soon caused the project to be cut short. The Finchley Central – Mill Hill East section had wartime priority (due to the Inglis Barracks) and was completed in 1941, but the plans to complete the modernisation and restart passenger services to Edgware were never resumed and were abandoned in 1950.

Steam freight trains continued to run between Finchley and Edgware until 1964; the track beyond Mill Hill East was lifted the following year. Although partly built over, including by the M1 motorway, most of the old track bed has become a footpath, and decaying 1930s concrete infrastructure, never used, can still be seen.

=== Buses ===
London Buses routes serving Mill Hill are 113, 114, 186, 221, 240, 251, 292, 302, 303, 305, 382, 605, 614, 628, 644, 688 and N113.

=== Road ===
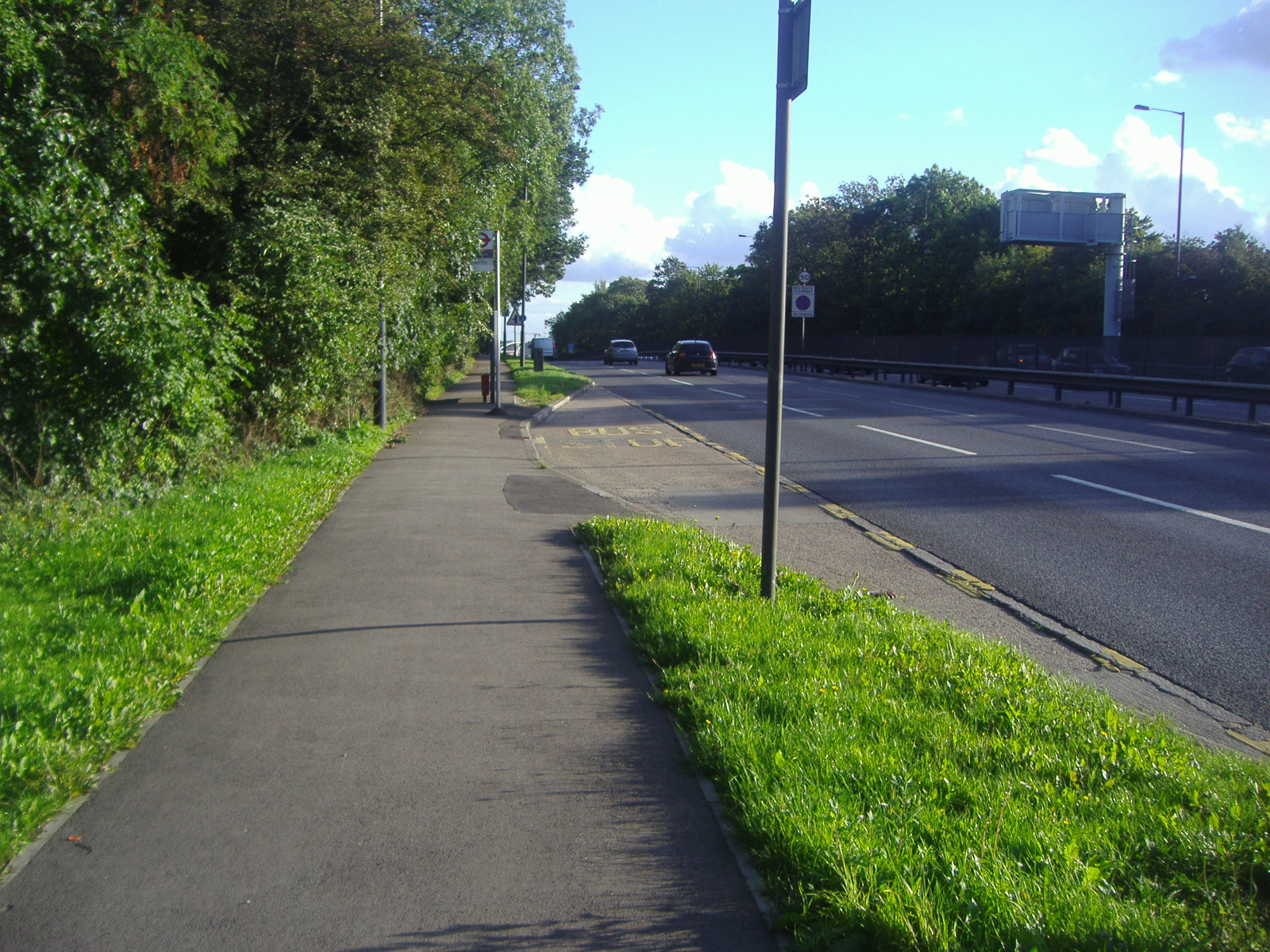
The A41 in Mill Hill facing south

The A1 and A41 converge as they enter Mill Hill at Fiveways Corner, this section is known as the Watford Way. The dual carriageway passes through Mill Hill, and the routes diverge at Apex Corner (officially Northway Circus). The M1 motorway was built through the western part of Mill Hill in 1967. There is a disused southbound exit slip road which passes under the Watford Way and which covers part of the old railway between Mill Hill East and Edgware Town.

== Development ==
Mill Hill East has been designated by the Mayor of London in his London Plan as a 'proposed area of intensification', in and around the Inglis Barracks site. As a result, Barnet Council designated the 'Mill Hill East Area Action Plan' (AAP) and carried out public consultation events. An at-times noisy 'examination in public', to test the 'soundness' of the council's submitted AAP proposals, was held in October 2008, conducted by the Planning Inspectorate, and the subsequent report broadly agreed with the council's plans.

Representations were made to the Planning Inspectorate to reopen the railway line from Mill Hill East station to the west.

A small victory for local protesters was that the report reaffirmed that a local closed road, Sanders Lane, would not be reopened for traffic, if only because the road was outside the AAP boundary (this had already conceded by the council) and would need separate consideration. The inspector stated in his report of December 2008:

Sanders Lane is outside the AAP boundary. Many of the matters that concern local residents and expressed at the Hearings can be addressed at a later stage.

The amended AAP was formally adopted by the council on 27 January 2009.

== Education ==
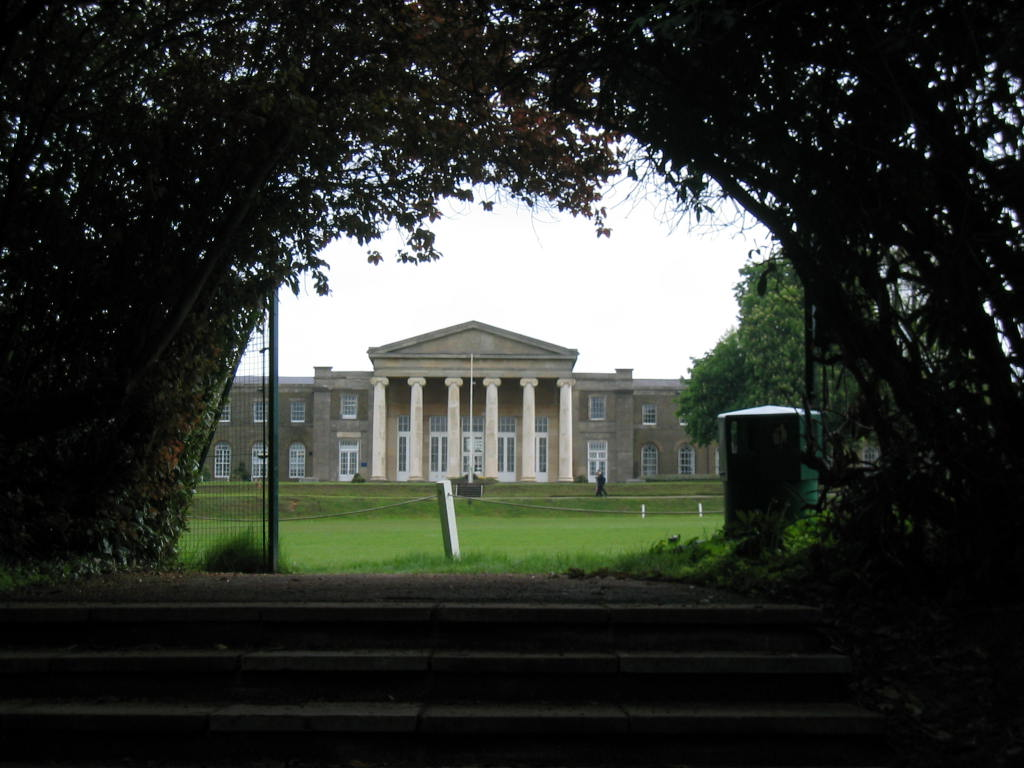
School House at Mill Hill School

=== Primary schools ===
- Courtland, a mixed community school
- Deansbrook Infant, mixed community school
- Deansbrook Junior, mixed community school
- Dollis Primary School and nursery, for 2-11 year olds
- Fairway, a mixed community school
- Grimsdell, an independent co-educational pre-preparatory school run by Mill Hill School Foundation
- Mathilda Marks Kennedy, a mixed Jewish voluntary aided school
- St. Martin's, an independent co-educational preparatory school
- St. Paul's CE a mixed, voluntary aided school
- St. Vincent's Catholic Primary School
- Etz Chaim Primary School, Free school
- Millbrook Park Primary School
- The Annuciation Catholic Infant and Junior School, mixed community Catholic school

=== Secondary schools ===
- Copthall School, a community girls school
- Mill Hill County High School, a mixed foundation school

=== Independent schools ===
The Mill Hill School Foundation runs the following schools:

- Mill Hill School – an independent boarding and day school for pupils aged 13–18
- Grimsdell – a pre-preparatory day school for pupils aged 3–7
- Belmont School – a day school for pupils aged 7–13
- The Mount School/ Mill Hill International – a mixed day and boarding school for international pupils aged 11–16
- Cobham Hall School – an independent day and boarding school for girls in the English parish of Cobham, Kent

== Invention and discovery ==
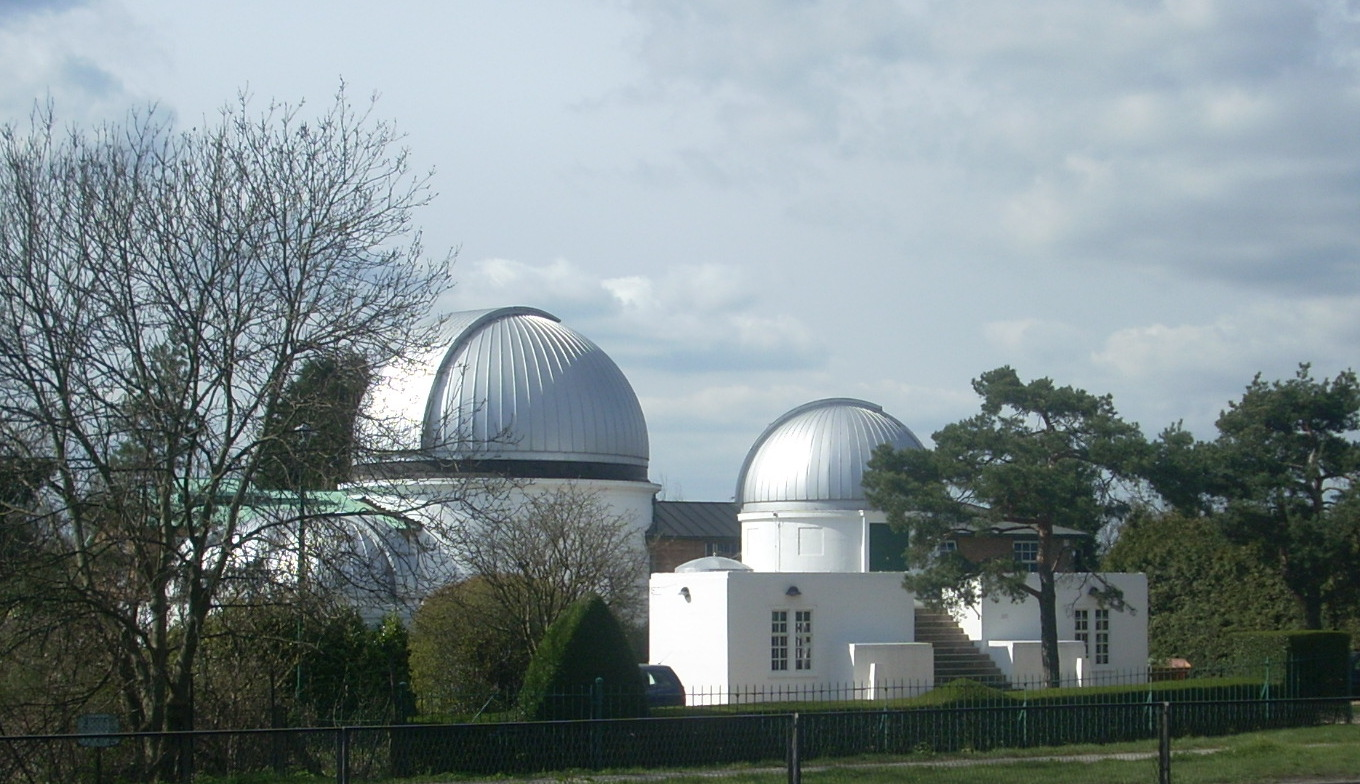
University of London Observatory

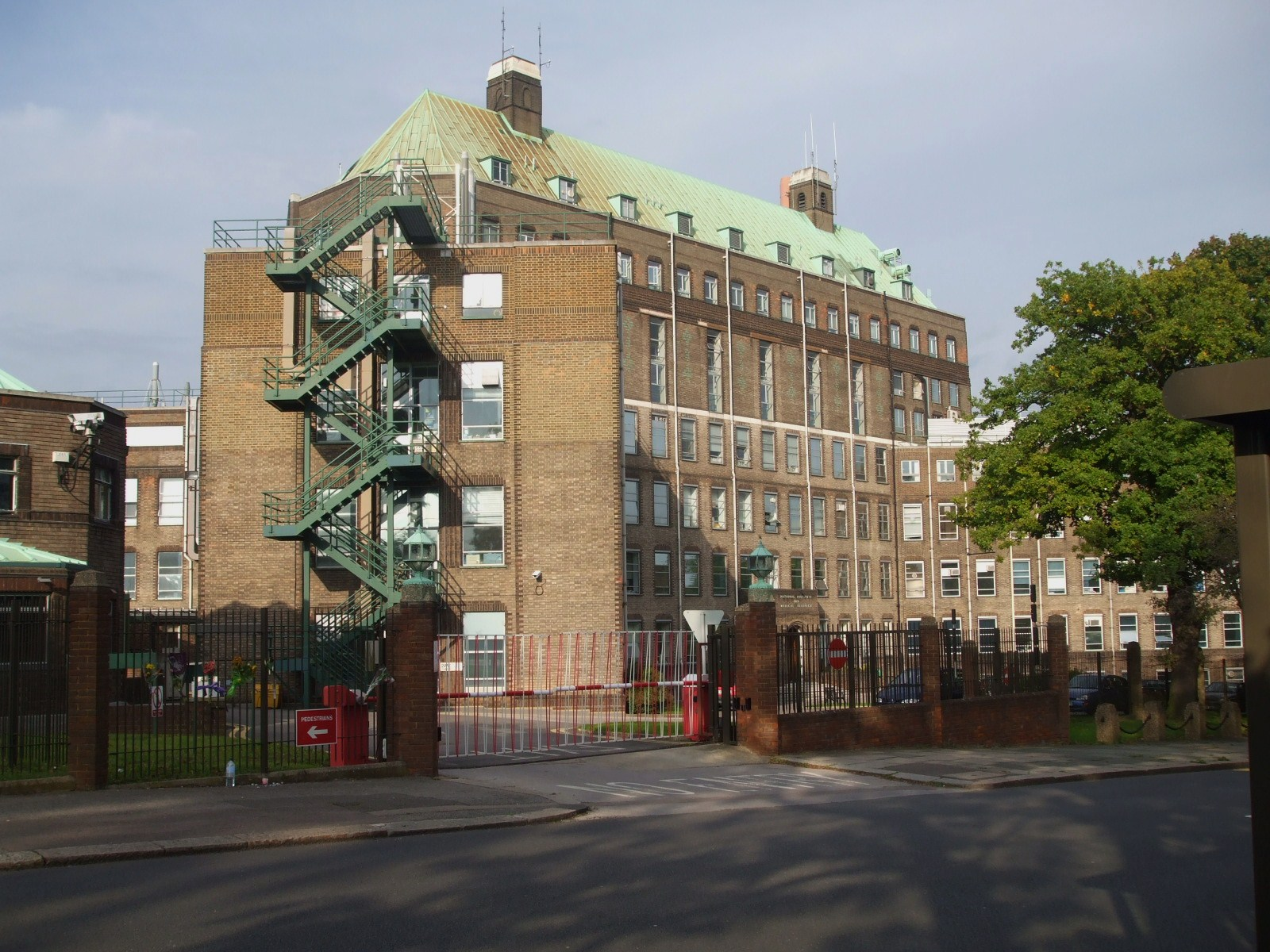
National Institute for Medical Research

In 1749 the botanist Peter Collinson inherited an estate which is now part of Mill Hill School, here he created a botanical garden. The lexicographer James Murray started work on the first Oxford English Dictionary in 1879, whilst teaching at Mill Hill School. He had a building built in the school grounds to house the quotation slips and his small editorial staff. Murray called this building his scriptorium, when the project moved to Oxford the building was used by the school as a reading room.

In the Second World War the Maudsley Hospital moved to the evacuated Mill Hill School as the Mill Hill Emergency Hospital. Here John C. Raven developed a verbal intelligence test called the Mill Hill Vocabulary scale.

University of London Observatory is a teaching astronomical observatory which is part of the Department of Physics and Astronomy at University College London. It is situated on the A41 Watford Way, southeast of The Broadway. The Observatory was opened on 8 October 1929 by the Astronomer Royal Frank Watson Dyson. In 2009, student astronomers at the observatory tracked the extrasolar planet HD 80606 b and for the first time accurately calculated its size.

The National Institute for Medical Research was a large medical research facility situated on the Ridgeway. Researchers at the Institute have, amongst other achievements, developed liquid and gas chromatography, discovered interferon and also discovered the sex determining gene SRY. In 2018 the Medical Research building was demolished to make way for new homes.

== Religious sites ==
There are several religious institutions along the Ridgeway, including:

- The Missionary Institute (which was present on the Ridgeway until 2007)
- Holcombe House (part of the institute)
- the motherhouse of the British Province of the Daughters of Charity of Saint Vincent de Paul
- until 2007, Saint Joseph's College, a large seminary.
- The Jehovah's Witnesses have had a centre since 1958, and they redeveloped the Carl Zeiss optical works to become the International Bible Students' Association in 1988.
- The Brotherhood of the Cross and Star, an African church next to the Village Pond at the junction of Milespit Hill, High Street and The Ridgeway, occupying the former Methodist Church.
- Mill Hill Synagogue is located near Mill Hill Broadway station. The Synagogue joined the United Synagogue as an affiliated synagogue in 1950.
- John Keble Church, Mill Hill

== Public services ==
Veolia Water Central Limited formerly Three Valleys Water supplies Mill Hill's water. EDF Energy Networks is the Distribution network operator licensed to distribute electricity from the transmission grid to homes and businesses in Mill Hill. On Partingdale Lane there is a large electrical station, built in 1961. The station is served by very high-voltage cables underground along Totteridge Valley. The proposed above-ground pylons and cables were rejected after a high-profile residents' campaign.

British Gas had a large gasworks at Mill Hill East with two gasometers, now replaced with housing and shops including a Waitrose supermarket.

== Parks and recreation ==
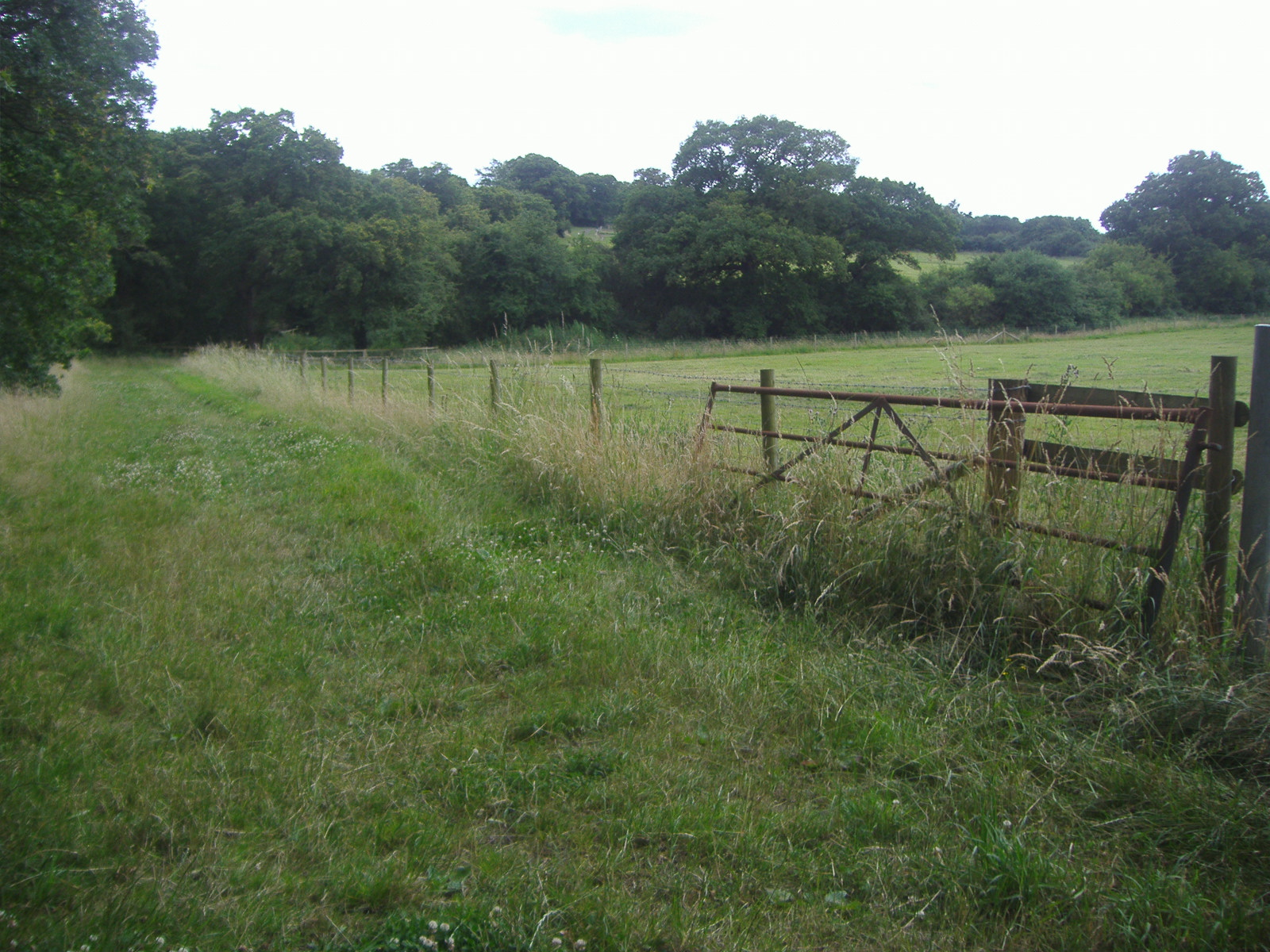
Field in Hendon Wood, Mill Hill

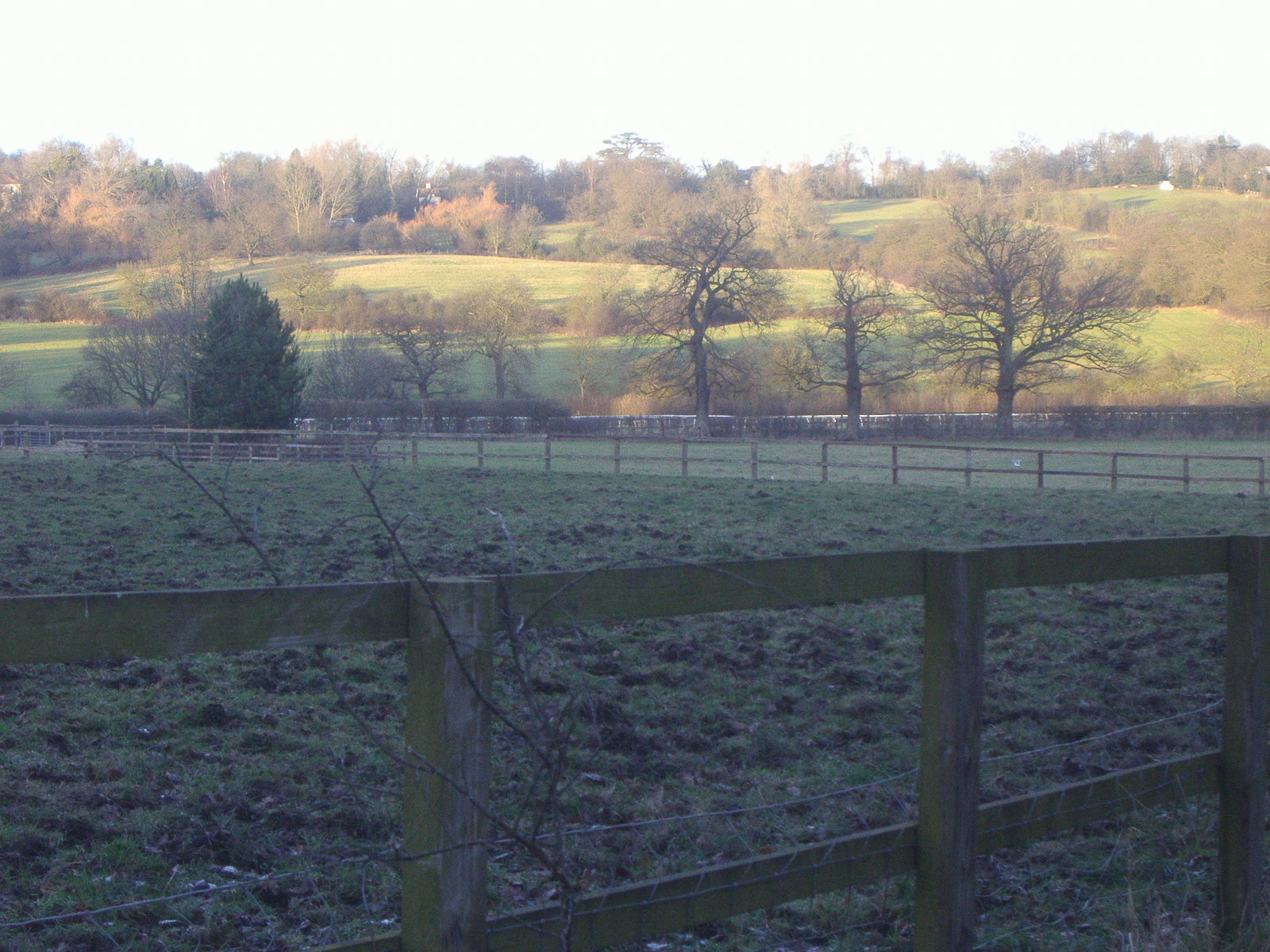
Rolling fields in Mill Hill

In 1923 Hendon Urban District Council brought part of Daws Farm thought to be named after Thomas Daws and turned it into Mill Hill Park. This was then transferred to Barnet Council in 1965 which now manages the park. In the park there are football pitches, cricket pitch, tennis courts, basketball court, a children's play area, outdoor gym, cafe and toilet block. The same building also houses Mill Hill Bowls Club with two pitches.

Arrandene Open Space is a green space that sits next to Mill Hill Park separated by Wise Lane.

== Notable people ==
- English traveller Celia Fiennes (1662–1741)
- Botanist Peter Collinson (1694–1768)
- Parliamentarian John Wilkes (1725–1797)
- Abolitionist William Wilberforce (1759–1833)
- Sir Stamford Raffles (1781–1826), founder of Singapore
- Bandleader Edmundo Ros (1910–2011) lived on Page Street at Edritt House, named after himself and his wife
- Actor John Slater (1916–1975)
- Writer, director Harold Snoad, born Mill Hill, 28 August 1935
- Actor Ian Carmichael (1920–2010) lived on Nan Clark's Lane
- Actor Patrick Troughton (1920–1987) best known as the second Doctor from Doctor Who, was born in Mill Hill and lived in Shakespeare Road.
- Actor Graham Crowden (1922–2010) lived on Hammers Lane
- Actor Angela Lansbury (1925–2022) lived with her parents at 7 Weymouth Avenue for the first half of the 1930s
- Actor Patrick McGoohan (1928–2009) lived on The Ridgeway with his wife and three daughters
- Racing driver Graham Hill (1929–1975) lived in Mill Hill for much of his adult life, along with his son Damon Hill (born 1960). Their house in Parkside has a blue plaque
- Playwright and novelist Michael Frayn (born 1933) was born in Mill Hill
- Songwriter Mitch Murray (born 1940) lived in Sunnyfield
- Athlete Julian Goater (born 1953) grew up in Grants Close
- Pop singer Paul Young (born 1956) lived at Hyver Hall
- Pop singer Rachel Stevens (born 1978) from S Club 7 lives in Mill Hill
- Businessman Claude Littner lives in Mill Hill.
- Pop group Girls Aloud resided at nearby Princess Park Manor.

== Sport ==
Old Cholmeleians Sports Ground is on Hendon Wood Lane, and provides facilities for football and cricket. It is the home base for Old Cholmeleians Cricket Club.

The local rugby club is Mill Hill Rugby Football Club established in 1937 with two men's teams. The 1st XV currently compete in Herts Middlesex 2, and the 2nd XV are in the Herts and Middlesex Merit leagues.

Mill Hill darts team, the current Middlesex Superleague champions, are based at Mill Hill Services Club.
