= Peuce Island =

Former island in present-day Romania

Coordinates: 45°04′00″N 28°45′00″E

Historical evolution of the Danube Delta (AD 1–2015)

In ancient geography, Peuce (Ancient Greek: Πεύκη, romanized: peúkē, lit. 'pine tree') is a former island in the Danube Delta, in Scythia Minor (present-day Tulcea County, Romania). It was about the size of the island of Rhodes. The inhabitants of the island were called Peucini (Ancient Greek: Πευκῖνοι).

It was to this island that in the 330s BC the West Thracian Triballian king Syrmus took refuge when pursued by Alexander the Great. Alexander brought ships up the Danube to use in an assault on the island. The attempts failed due to the swift current of the river, steep banks, and fierce defense. Eventually the Macedonians abandoned their attacks on Peuce and instead crossed into the territory of the Getae to attack them.

A portion of the powerful Bastarnae tribe (probably a mixed Germanic-Celtic society) settled on the island, apparently in the 2nd century BC, and adopted from their abode an alternative tribal name, "Peucini", used by some classical authors to cover sections of the Bastarnae tribe which had never set foot on the island.

Peuce Island is also thought to be the birthplace of Alaric I (Latin: Alaricus) king of the Visigoths from 395 to 410 who is famous for his sack of Rome in 410.

The Battle of Ongal of 680 also took place on the Peuce Island. The battle was crucial for the creation of the First Bulgarian Empire.

The island disappeared during the Early Middle Ages, when the Danube's distributaries changed courses.
