= Nathaniel Hailes =

English journalist (1802–1879)

Nathaniel Hailes (1802 – 24 July 1879) was an English journalist who had a considerable career in South Australia as a land agent and in administration. He contributed to various newspapers under the byline "Rifleman" and as "Timothy Short".

== History ==
Hailes was born in London, and moved in influential literary and artistic circles: he was a sufficiently close friend of Lady Byron to dissuade her from publishing a paper on female education; he knew Hazlitt, Rev. Rowland Hill, Allan Cunningham, De Quincey, Edward Irving, Dr Chalmers, and Sir Walter Scott.

In 1838 he was appointed superintendent of the Buckinghamshire contingent of emigrants to South Australia, which arrived at Holdfast Bay in March 1839. Mr and Mrs Hailes and their three children settled in North Adelaide.

He founded an auction company in 1839, with premises on Hindley Street, in 1840 with William Patey Peek as Hailes & Peek, later in King William Street. His last sale was his own property "Woodside", somewhere in the vicinity of Auldana. His son Nathaniel S. Hailes acted in his place from 1851.

He started a newspaper, Adelaide Free Press, which ceased publication after barely a month (October – November 1841) due, no doubt, to an overcrowded market rather than any lack of quality.

He was a member of the Adelaide City Council 1841–1842, elected on 31 October 1840. Aldermen were J. H. Fisher, A. H. Davis, M. Smillie and G. Stevenson; councillors were N. Hailes, J. Brown, C. Mann, J. Hallett, W. Blyth, W. G. Lambert, H. Watson, T. Wilson, E. Rowlands, E. W. Andrews, J. Frew, W. H. Neale, S. East, W. Sanders and J. V. Wakeham. The mayor, as chosen by the council was James Hurtle Fisher.

In 1842 he succeeded J. E. Barnard as Clerk of the Peace at Port Lincoln, coincident with Charles Driver succeeding James Macdonald as its Government Resident and a year later took over the duties of Deputy Registrar of Births, Marriages, and Deaths for the District from Driver. His duties brought him into contact with the local Aboriginal people, and he wrote much on their language and customs. He was appointed executor to the town's postmaster, J. B. Harvey, and as such defended his memory in the face of anonymous accusations.

He is reported as having brief stint in Mount Gambier, and contributing a lively column "Random Shots at Flying Game" to the Border Watch newspaper under the byline "Rifleman" but corroboration is difficult to find.

He served as secretary to the South Australian Institute from its foundation in 1856 to 1859.

This was followed by an appointment to the Labour Prison at Dry Creek but, again, details are hard to find.

Hailes died at the residence of his eldest daughter Mrs H. Taylor, Hanson-street, Adelaide, on 24 July 1879 aged 76 years.

== Family ==
Hailes was married to Eliza Hailes (c. 1815 – 17 January 1893) Their children included

- daughter married Taylor
- Alice Hailes married Benjamin Holroyd of Port Lincoln, on 31 January 1861.
- Nathaniel Simpson Hailes married Janet Low (c. 1830 – 15 April 1852)
- Elizabeth Sarah Hailes (16 November 1839 – 30 December 1926), married Walter Rutt (1842 – 18 May 1924) on 30 August 1873
- Frederick Hailes (13 February 1841 – 7 September 1856)
- Edith Hailes (27 November 1846 – 24 February 1847)

== Publications ==
Personal Recollections of a Septuagenarian series of (almost) weekly articles published in the South Australian Register from 15 December 1876 to 17 July 1878 in 46 instalments.
