= The Hale =

Coordinates: 51.620°N 0.260°W

- Location within Greater London
- Population: 17,437 (2011 Census. Ward)
- OS grid reference: TQ205918
- London borough: Barnet
- Ceremonial county: Greater London
- Region: London
- Country: England
- Sovereign state: United Kingdom
- Post town: LONDON
- Postcode district: NW7
- Post town: EDGWARE
- Postcode district: HA8
- Dialling code: 020
- Police: Metropolitan
- Fire: London
- Ambulance: London
- UK Parliament: Hendon
- London Assembly: Barnet and Camden

The Hale is an area and ward within the London Borough of Barnet. It is situated where the eastern part of Edgware meets the western part of Mill Hill and centres on the small retail centre at the junction of Deans Lane, Hale Lane and Selvage Lane. This centre constitutes Upper Hale, but is better known locally as the 'Green Man' after the pub of the same name that stood at the site from at least the early 18th century.

A smaller area that was traditionally known as Lower Hale centres on the junction of Hale Lane, Farm Road and the nearby bridge over Deans Brook; this latter area is generally regarded as being within Edgware.

The traditional area known as The Hale extends northwards from the Green Man to the A41 and Apex Corner and the southern end is traditionally marked by the disused Edgware and Highgate railway line just south of West Way and Hale Drive; beyond lies Burnt Oak. Today's borough ward has slightly larger boundaries.

== History ==
The Hale was a rural area until well into the 20th century, with only the Green Man pub and the Railway Tavern (still in existence today) on opposite corners, as well as farms at Upper Hale and Lower Hale. The Green Man pub was somewhat famous in the 19th century, including for sports such as boxing. The pub was totally rebuilt as it is today in the late 1920s, but eventually became Everglades (a Tex-Mex restaurant) in the late 1980s and has since become a Harvester Inn called the Jolly Badger.

At the turn of the 20th century, The Hale was a popular place for day-trippers from Central London who frequented the two public houses. The area changed quickly with rapid development in the late 1920s and early 1930s, particularly triggered by the arrival of the Northern line to Edgware station in 1924, and the consequent introduction of omnibus services from that station to The Hale and Mill Hill. The farms at Upper Hale and Lower Hale were sold and developed for residential housing, such as the Hale Estate (based around the east side of Selvage Lane, Sunbury Avenue, Sunbury Gardens and Maxwelton Avenue) in the late 1920s. Thus, since the early 1930s The Hale has been a suburban area generally characterised by private detached and semi-detached houses.

A notable building in The Hale is a church named in honour of John Keble. It a Grade II-listed modernist-style building which was completed in 1936. Another significant building is Maxwelton House - recently discovered during renovations to be one of the oldest buildings in the larger Edgware and Mill Hill area - which is now a school building on Hale Lane. In 1932, the John Groom's Crippleage was opened just south of the A41 Edgware Way near Stoneyfields Lane; this was closed in the 1980s and replaced by modern private housing.

== Transport ==
The Hale was formerly served by Mill Hill (The Hale) railway station on Bunns Lane from 1906 until it shut in 1939. Its immediate neighbour, Mill Hill Broadway railway station, is the nearest station today, within a short walking distance.

The Hale is directly served by London Buses routes 221, 240, 292 and 303 - and routes 113, 186 and Uno route 614 serve the A41 at the north end of the district. All of these routes also serve Edgware station on the Northern line, which remains the other main route to and from the area.

At various times 'Mill Hill Green Man ' was itself a terminal point for buses, most famously the 52 from Victoria from the early 1930s until the construction of the M1 and the then new bus station at Mill Hill Broadway, to which the 52 was diverted in 1967 until its replacement in 1992 by today's 302.
