= Mill Hill Broadway railway station =

National Rail station in London, England

Mill Hill Broadway
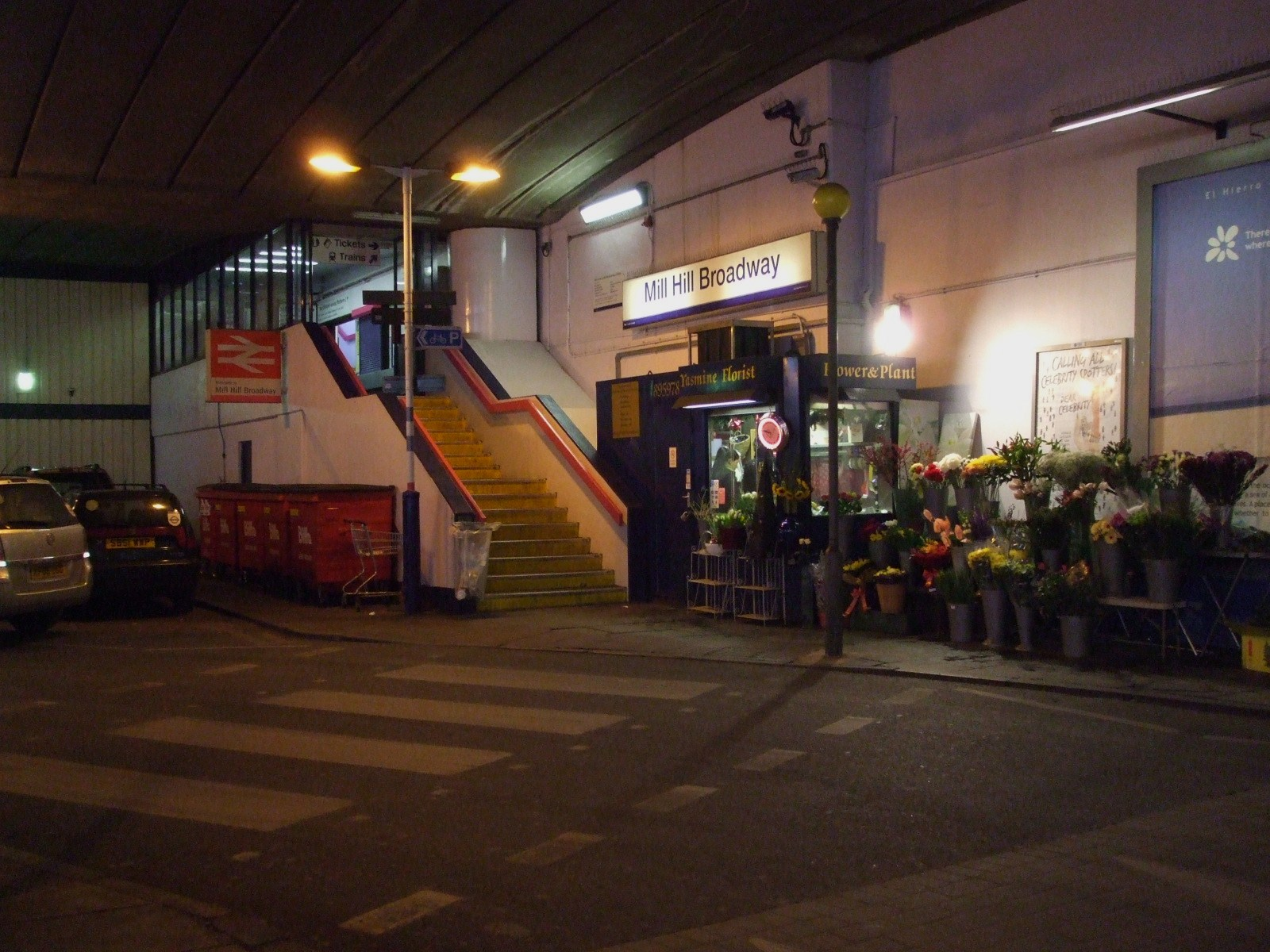
- Interactive map of Mill Hill Broadway

General information
- Location: Mill Hill
- Local authority: London Borough of Barnet
- Managed by: Greater Thameslink Railway
- Station code: MIL
- DfT category: D
- Number of platforms: 4
- Fare zone: 4

National Rail annual entry and exit
- 2020–21: ▼0.583 million
- 2021–22: ▲1.204 million
- 2022–23: ▲1.587 million
- 2023–24: ▲1.673 million
- 2024–25: ▲1.875 million

Key dates
- 9 March 1868: Opened for goods
- 13 July 1868: opened for passengers

Other information
- External links: Departures; Facilities
- Coordinates: 51.6130°N 0.2489°W

Mill Hill Broadway railway station is a stop on the Midland Main Line, serving the suburb of Mill Hill in the London Borough of Barnet, north London, England. It is 9 miles 28 chains (15.0 km) down the line from St Pancras, and is situated between Hendon to the south and Elstree & Borehamwood to the north. Its three-letter station code is MIL.

The station is served by Govia Thameslink Railway-operated trains on the Thameslink route. It is in Transport for London's London fare zone 4.

== History ==
The station was built by the Midland Railway as simply Mill Hill in 1868 on its extension to St. Pancras, being renamed in 1950. The station was rebuilt in the 1960s in connection with the construction of the M1 motorway.

Prior to the major engineering works to create the Thameslink Box at St Pancras, Mill Hill Broadway was also served at peak times by Moorgate fast trains. These trains provided a non-stop service to King's Cross Thameslink twice an hour. In 2009, several morning peak southbound fast services (stopping only at West Hampstead Thameslink) and several evening peak northbound fast services (stopping only at West Hampstead Thameslink) were reinstated.

From March 2009, Southeastern and Govia Thameslink Railway began running some peak hour trains from Sevenoaks to Luton, though in the off-peak these services turn back at Kentish Town.

== Services ==
All services at Mill Hill Broadway are operated by Govia Thameslink Railway using Class 700 electric multiple units.

The typical off-peak service in trains per hour is:

- 6 tph to St Albans City, of which 2 continue to Luton
- 2 tph to Rainham, via Dartford
- 4 tph to Sutton, of which 2 run via Mitcham Junction and 2 run via Wimbledon)

During peak hours, the station is served by additional services between Luton and Orpington via Catford, as well as some late evening services to and from Bedford.

The station is also served by a night service between Bedford and Three Bridges on Sunday to Friday nights.

Preceding station	National Rail	Following station
Elstree & Borehamwood	Thameslink Thameslink	Hendon

== Connections ==
London Buses routes 114, 186, 221, 240, 251, 302, 303, 605, 628 and 688 serve the station.

== Gallery ==
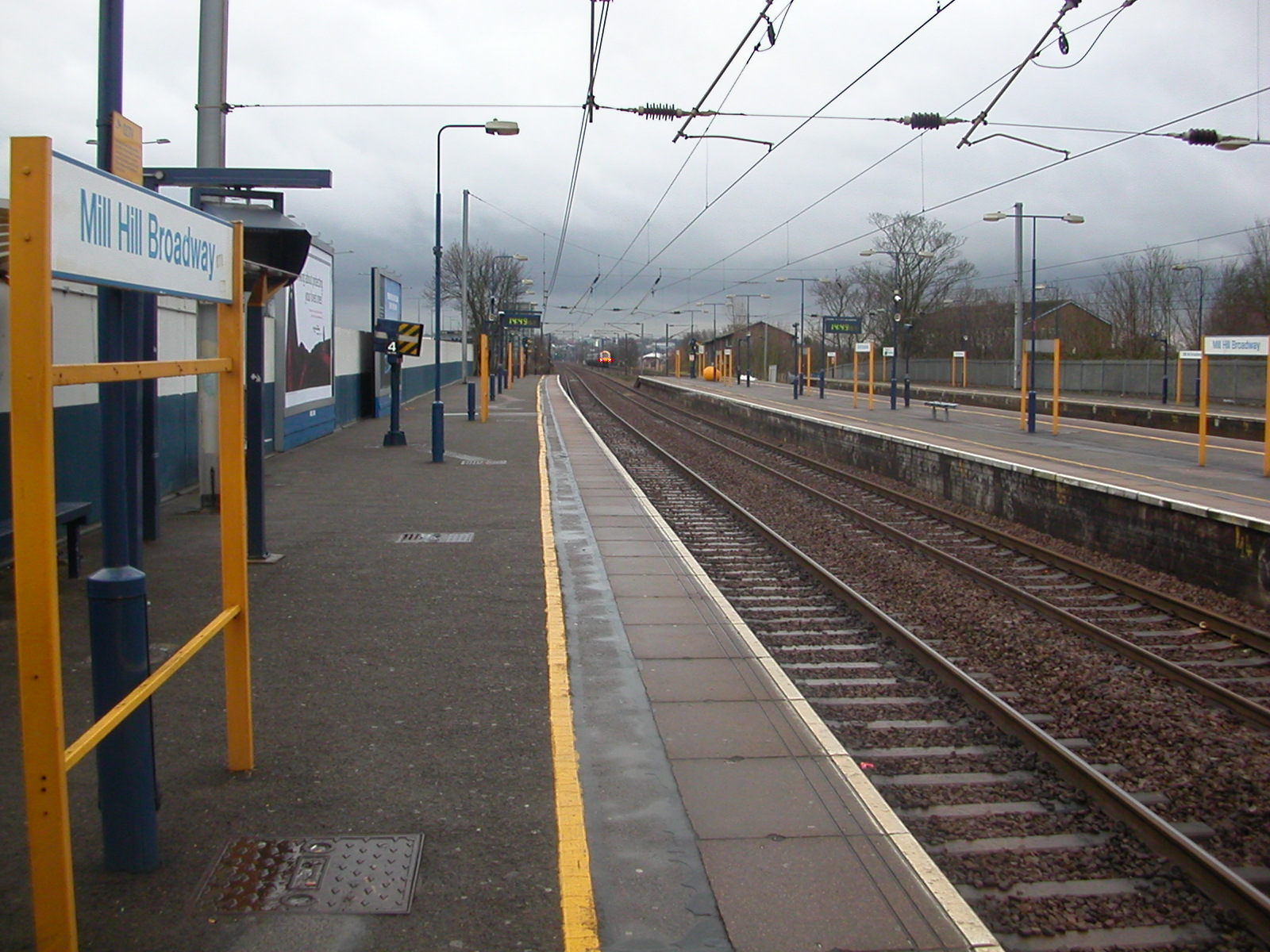
Southbound view from platform 1, with Midland Mainline Class 222 Meridian unit in the distance.

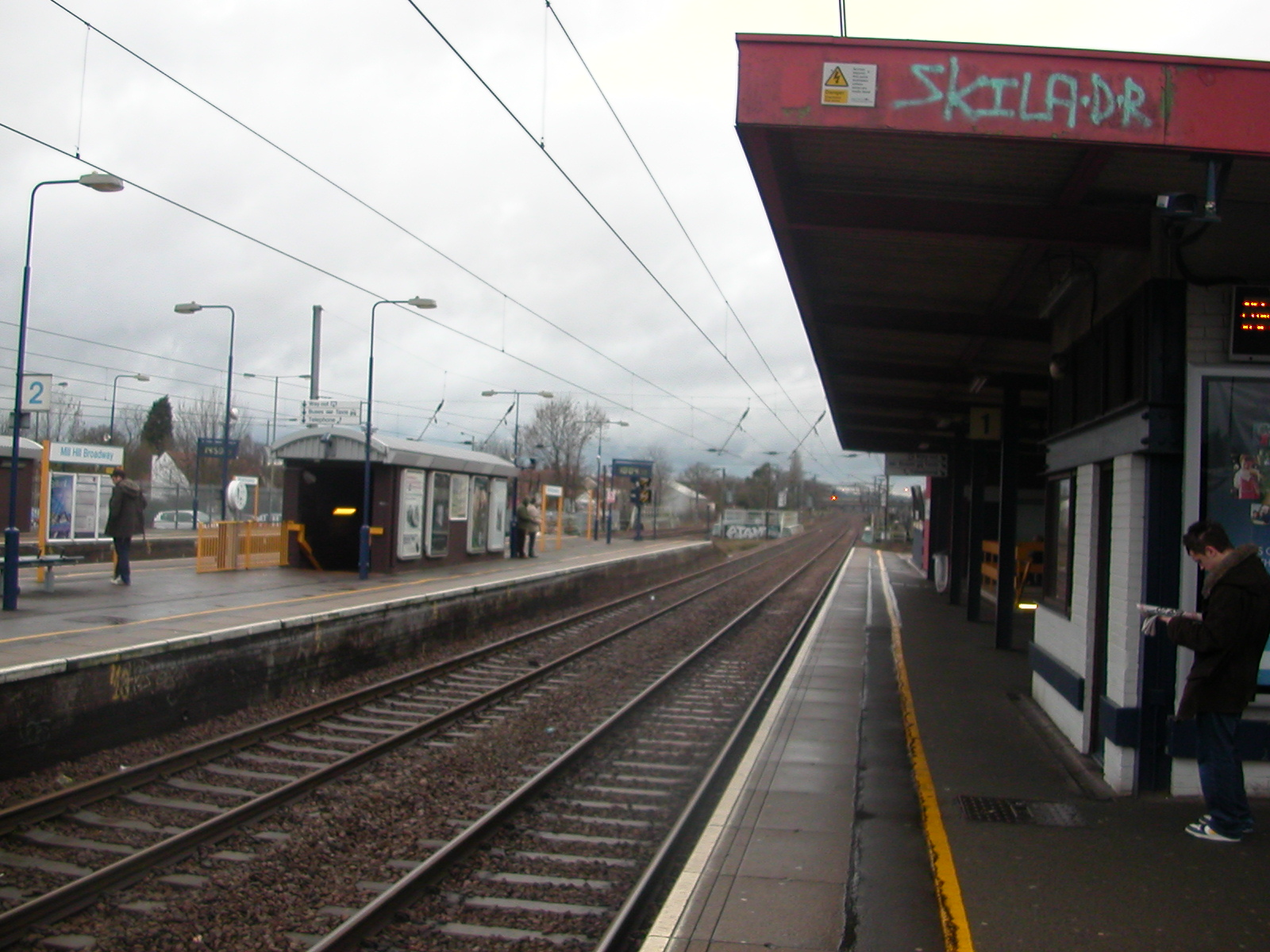
Northbound view from Platform 1.

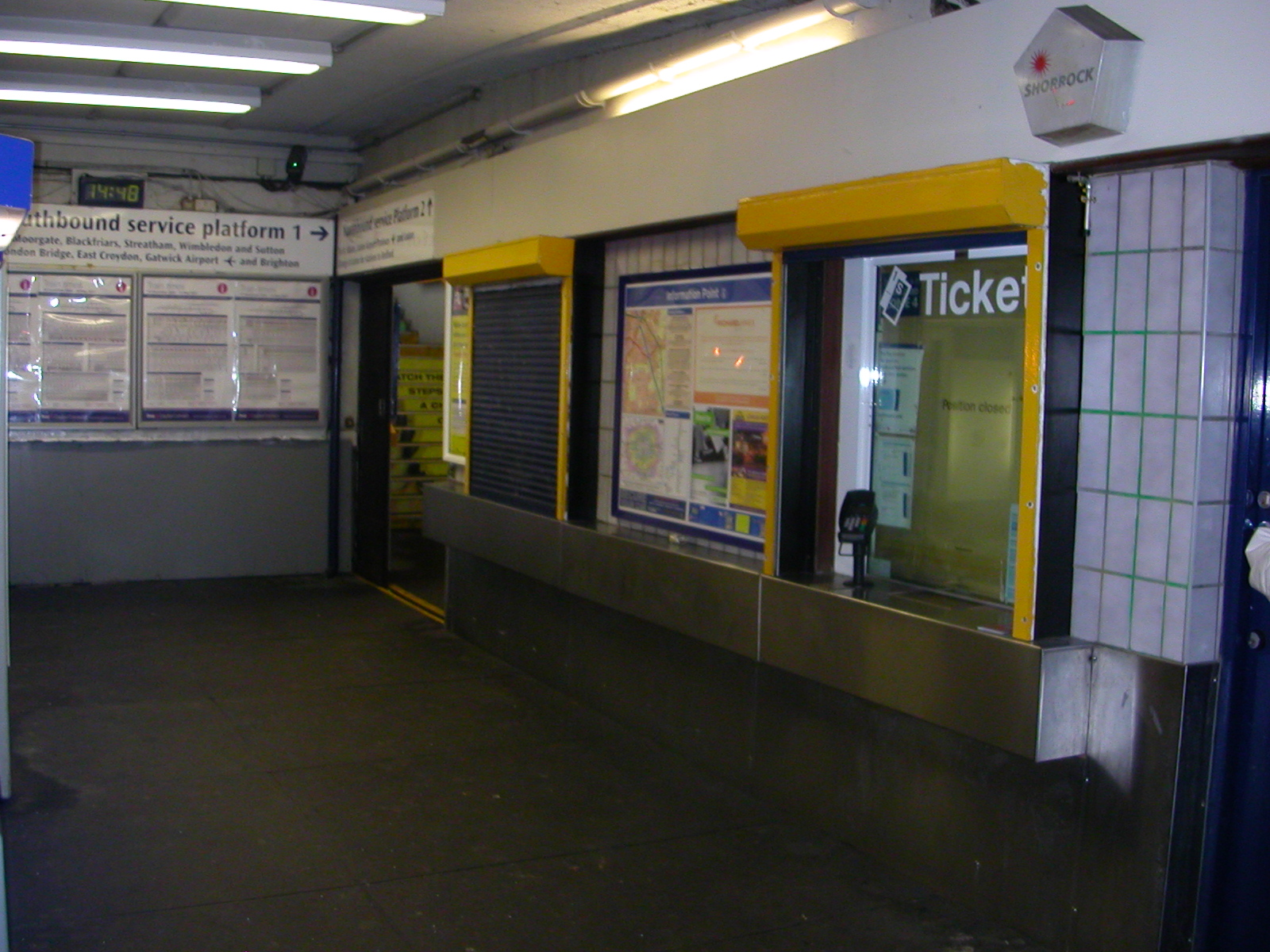
Ticket office

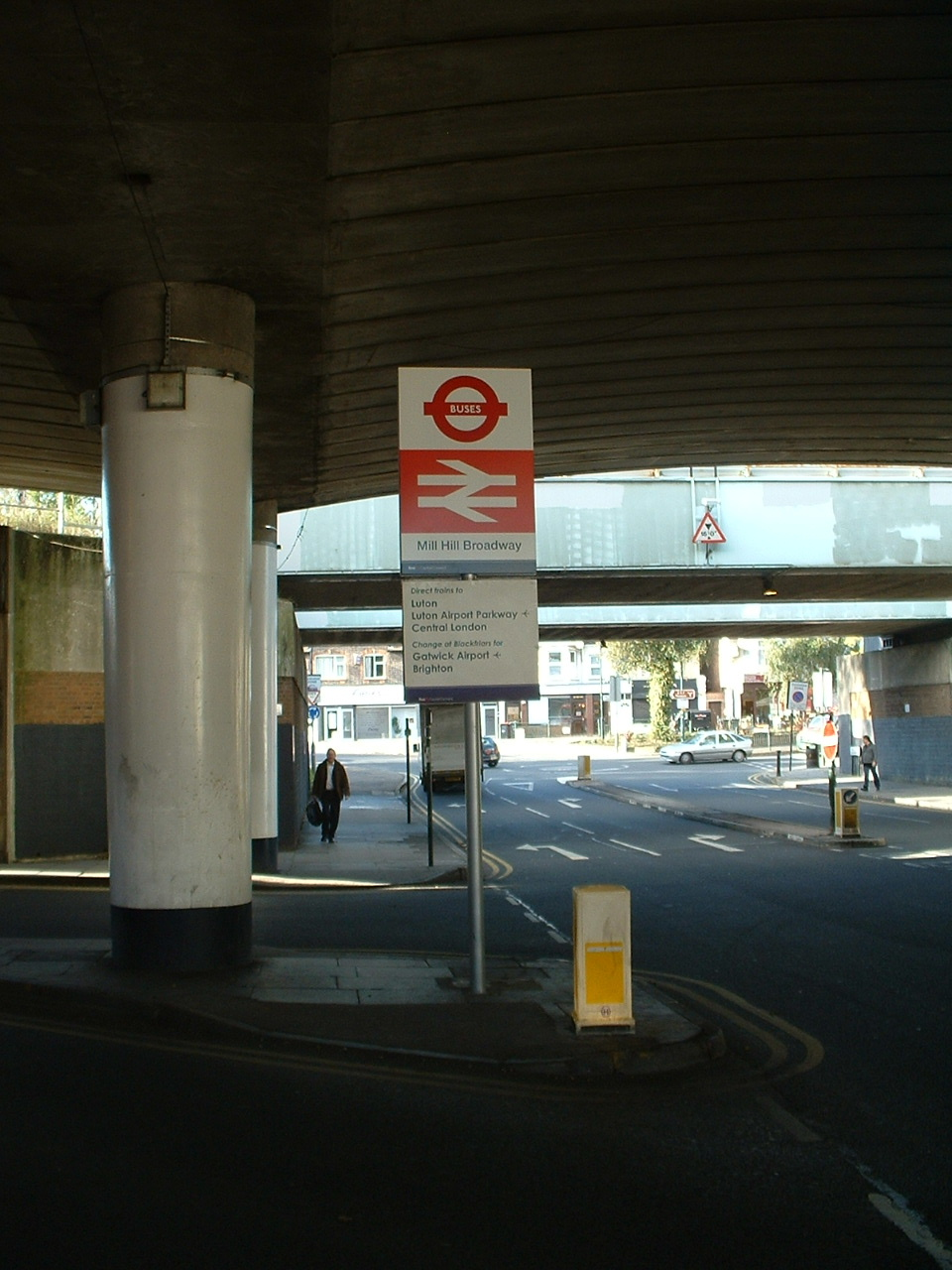
Sign on the A5100 Mill Hill Broadway, as it passes under the M1 motorway

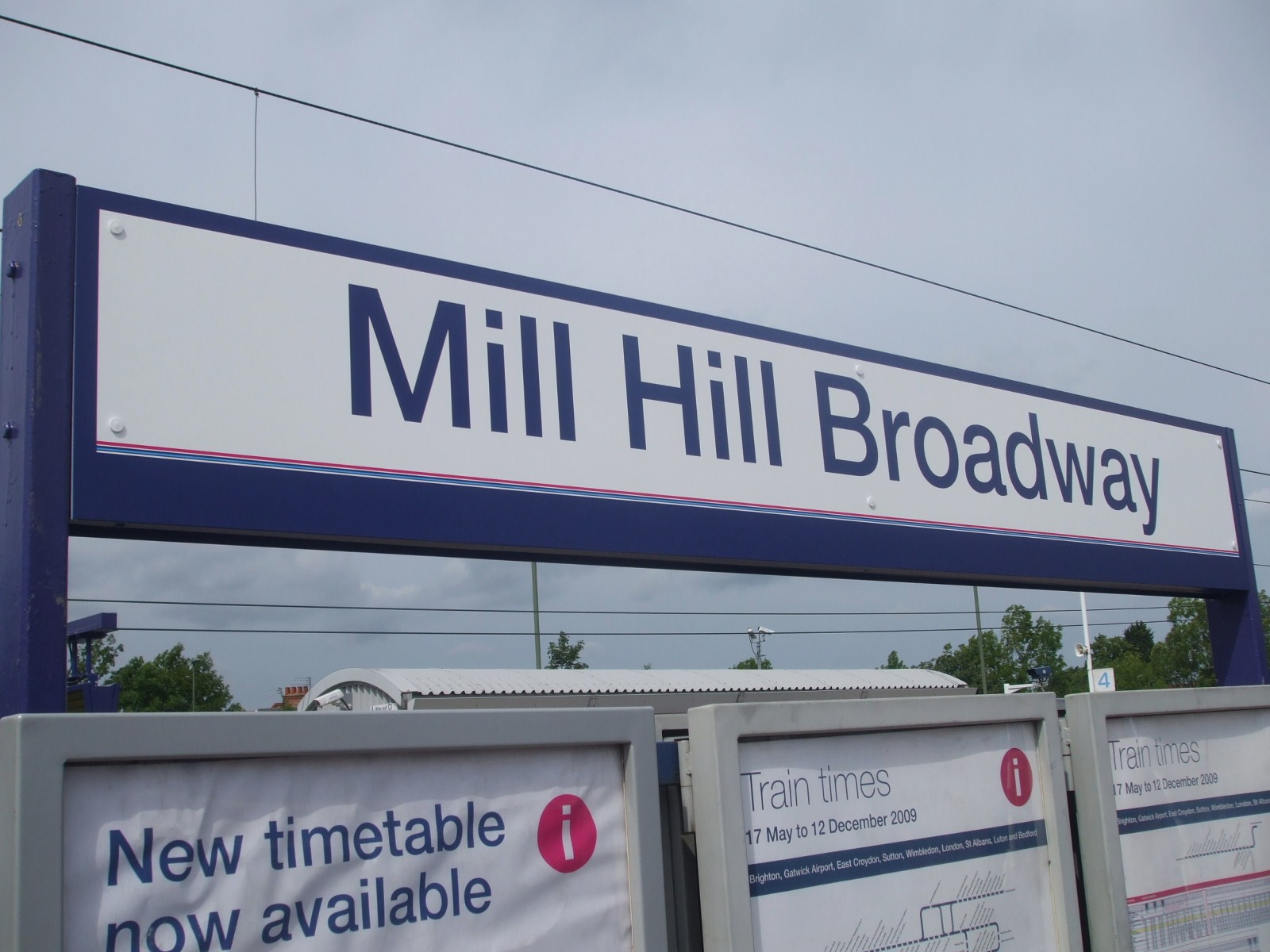
Signage on platforms (summer 2009)
