= Fanula Papazoglu =

Yugoslav historian (1917–2001)

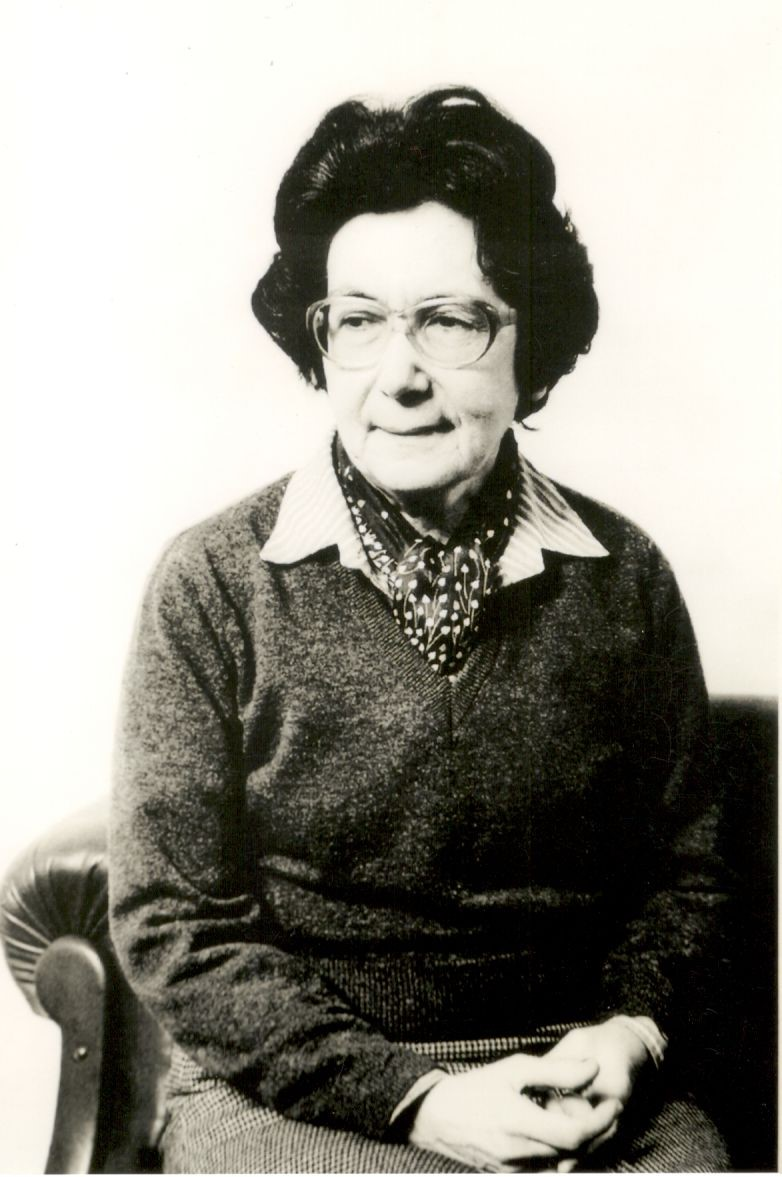
- Born: February 3, 1917; Bitola, Allied Powers' zone
- Died: January 26, 2001 (aged 83); Belgrade, FR Yugoslavia
- Education: University of Belgrade
- Spouse: George Ostrogorsky
- Scientific career
- Fields: Ancient history

Fanula Papazoglu (Serbo-Croatian: Фанула Папазоглу; Greek: Φανούλα Παπάζογλου, romanized: Fanoúla Papázoglou; 1917 – January 26, 2001) was a Yugoslav classical scholar, epigrapher and academic. She was an expert in Ancient history of the Balkans. She founded the Centre for Ancient Epigraphy and Numismatics in 1970.

== Life ==
Papazoglu was born in Bitola, Allied Powers' zone (modern North Macedonia), into a Greek family of Aromanian origin. She finished secondary school (1936) in Bitola, before attending the University of Belgrade Faculty of Philosophy, where she studied classical philology, ancient history, and archeology. During the Invasion of Yugoslavia she supported the Yugoslav Partisans as a member of the student organization, and spent a year in the Banjica concentration camp from 1942 to 1943.

She graduated from the Faculty of Philosophy in 1946, and worked at the Department for Ancient History at the Faculty of Philosophy from 1947. Her Ph.D. thesis in 1955 was Macedonian towns during the Roman period. She became a full professor in 1965.

On March 21, 1974, she was elected to the Serbian Academy of Sciences and Arts (SANU) as a corresponding member, and became a full member on December 15, 1983.

At the Belgrade University Papazoglu met and married the prominent Yugoslav Byzantologist of Russian origin, George Ostrogorsky, with whom she had a daughter, Tatyana, and a son, Alexander. Papazoglou retired in 1979. She died in Belgrade in 2001.

Papazoglu wrote in the same tradition as other archaeologists of her era, culture-historical-evolutionist archaeology. Her work focused on the subject of the "Central Balkan tribes" (Autaritae, Scordisci, Dardani, Triballi, Moesi) which she defined as compact collective groups associated with specific archaeological cultures distinct from other archaeological cultures and defined stable borders throughout antiquity. Her work was influential in her era, but has been criticized in contemporary archaeology. The conclusions about the existence and organization of the "central Balkan tribes" often presuppose a theoretical framework which corresponds to modern concepts to identity formation. This framework was used irrespective of the written and material records which were made to correspond to pre-drawn conclusions about the "Central Balkan Tribes". Often these theoretical models served for the categorization of material finds. Mihailović (2014) notes that Triballi is the name of a pre-Roman people near Roman Oescus for which Papazoglu constructed a defined territory which in reality is undeterminable via available data. In turn, archaeologists of that era in Yugoslavia began to categorize all finds in the area defined as Triballian by Papazoglu as artifacts of the Triballi tribe. In a similar vein, Papazoglou constructed a Kingdom of Dardania which is never defined as such in written records and defined its borders. In reality, in the pre-Roman era only the southern "borders" of Dardania are defined but there is no other information about its boundary to the north. Papazoglou contrasted her construction of Dardanian society to the more "civilized" and "organized" Illyrians. Winnifrith (2021) criticizes her comparison as an indication that she "was anxious not only to disassociate Illyrians from Dardanians, but also Illyrians from Albanians".

== Work ==
- Makedonski gradovi u rimsko doba ("Macedonian towns during the Roman period"), 1955, thesis
- Prilozi istoriji Singidunuma i srednjeg Podunavlja Gornje Mezije, 1957
- Makedonski gradovi u rimsko doba, 1957
- Srednjobalkanska plemena u predrimsko doba ("The Central Balkan Tribes in Pre-Roman Times"), 1969, 1978
- Rimski građanski ratovi, 1991
- Istorija helenizma ("History of Hellenism"), 1995

== Awards ==
- October Prize of the City of Belgrade
- July 7 Award (7. jul)
