= Thomas Hales =

Thomas Hales may refer to:

- Thomas Hales (c. 1515 – at least 1585), MP for Canterbury
- Sir Thomas Hales, 2nd Baronet (1666–1748), British Member of Parliament
- Sir Thomas Hales, 3rd Baronet (c. 1695–1762), British Member of Parliament and courtier
- Sir Thomas Hales, 4th Baronet (c. 1726–1773), British Member of Parliament
- Thomas Hales (dramatist) (c. 1740–1780), Anglo-French dramatist
- Thomas Callister Hales (born 1958), American mathematician
- Tom Hales (Irish republican) (1892–1966), Irish republican and politician
- Tom Hales (jockey) (1847–1901), Australian jockey

== See also ==
- Thomas Hale (disambiguation)
