= Hales (king) =

4th-century BC king of the Triballi, a Thracian tribe

Hales or Chales (fl. 376–375 BC) was the king of the Triballi, a Thracian tribe that inhabited the region between West Morava and South Morava ("Angros" and "Brongos") rivers, called the "Triballian field" (πεδίον τὸ Τριβαλλικὸν) in what is today south-eastern Serbia.

In 376 BC, he led the Triballian army of 30,000 warriors and crossed Mount Haemus and the Sofia plain, followed the valley of the Strymon river and advanced as far as Abdera. His forces had nearly destroyed the city before Chabrias, an Athenian general, was able to negotiate a peace between the Triballi and the king of Maronea, in the process winning over the Triballi to the Athenian side.

Regnal titles
Preceded by ?	King of the Triballi fl. 376–75 BC	Succeeded by Syrmus (330s BC)
