= Triballi =

Ancient tribe in the Balkans

The Triballi (Ancient Greek: Τριβαλλοί, romanized: Triballoí, Latin: Triballi) were an ancient people who lived in northern Bulgaria in the region of Roman Oescus up to southeastern Serbia, possibly near the territory of the Morava Valley in the late Iron Age. The Triballi lived between Thracians to the east, Illyrians the west and Celts to the north and were influenced by them. As such in contemporary sources, they are variably described as an independent, Thracian, Illyrian or Celtic tribe. Strabo considered the Triballi as a Thracian people. Most ancient sources considered the Triballi as Thracians, while some few regarded them as Illyrians.

As an existing people, the Triballi are mentioned for the last time by Roman historian Appian (2nd century CE). According to Appian, the Triballi were reduced in numbers through their wars against the Scordisci and fled among the Getae, north of the Danube before they went extinct as a distinct people.

== History ==
The Triballi (Ancient Greek: Τριβαλλοί, romanized: Triballoí) are mentioned first in history by ancient Greek authors of the Classical period: by Aristophanes in his play Birds (414 BC) in which Triballos, a barbarian Triballian god of Thrace, accompanies Poseidon and Herakles as a diplomatic embassy, who are quite starving, meant to persuade the play's hero, Peisetairos, to end his blockade (Nephelokokkygia) preventing sacrifices – the sustenance of gods – from reaching them on Olympos; by Aristotle and Demosthenes, both of whom lived in the 4th century BC. Among ancient Greeks, the Triballi had a reputation of being a "wild people" and Greek authors write in a similar vein about them. Aristotle writes that among the Triballi "it is honorable to sacrifice one’s life in a battle", while Demosthenes notes the gangs of "lawless youths" of ancient Athens were known as Triballoi.

In 424 BC, they were attacked by Sitalkes, king of the Odrysae, who was defeated and lost his life in the engagement. They were pushed to the east by the invading Autariatae, an Illyrian tribe; the date of this event is uncertain.

In 376 BC, a large band of Triballi under King Hales crossed Mount Haemus and advanced as far as Abdera; they had backing from Maroneia and were preparing to besiege the city when Chabrias appeared off the coast, with the Athenian fleet, and organized a reconciliation.

In 339 BC, when Philip II of Macedon was returning from his expedition against the Scythians, the Triballi refused to allow him to pass the Haemus unless they received a share of the booty. Hostilities took place, in which Philip was defeated and wounded by a spear in his right thigh, but the Triballi appear to have been subsequently subdued by him.

After the death of Philip, Alexander the Great passed through the lands of the Odrysians in 335-334 BC, crossed the Haemus ranges and after three encounters (Battle of Haemus, Battle at Lyginus River, Battle at Peuce Island) defeated and drove the Triballians to the junction of the Lyginus at the Danube. 3,000 Triballi were killed, the rest fled. Their king Syrmus (eponymous to Roman Sirmium) took refuge on the Danubian island of Peukê, where most of the remnants of the defeated Thracians were exiled. The successful Macedonian attacks terrorized the tribes around the Danube; the autonomous Thracian tribes sent tributes for peace, Alexander was satisfied with his operations and accepted peace because of his greater wars in Asia.

They were attacked by Autariatae and Celts in 295 BC.

The punishment inflicted by Ptolemy Keraunos on the Getae, however, induced the Triballi to sue for peace. About 279 BC, a host of Gauls (Scordisci) under Cerethrius defeated the Triballi with an army of 3,000 horsemen and 15,000 foot soldiers. The defeat pushed the Triballi further to the east. Nevertheless, they continued to cause trouble to the Roman governors of Macedonia for fifty years (135 BC–84 BC).

Pliny the Elder (23-79 AD) registers them as one of the tribes of Moesia.

In the time of Ptolemy (90–168 AD), their territory was limited to the district between the Ciabrus (Tzibritza) and Utus (Vit) rivers, part of what is now Bulgaria; their chief town was Oescus.

Under Tiberius, mention is made of Triballia in Moesia; and the Emperor Maximinus Thrax (reigned 235–237) had been a commander of a squadron of Triballi. The name occurs for the last time during the reign of Diocletian, who dates a letter from Triballis.

== Archaeology ==
The research of the Triballi began with Fanula Papazoglu's book The Central Balkan Tribes in Pre-Roman Times (1968 in Serbian, 1978 in English). Other historians and archaeologists who wrote on the Triballi include Milutin Garašanin, Dragoslav Srejović, Nikola Tasić, Rastko Vasić, Miloš Jevtić and, especially, Milorad Stojić (Tribali u arheologiji i istorijskim izvorima, 2017).

Based on the work of Fanula Papazoglou, several archeological findings in the Morava Valley (Great Morava and South Morava) region in the Iron Age have been linked to the Triballi. In 2005, several possibly Triballi graves were found at the Hisar Hill in Leskovac, southeastern Serbia. In June 2008, a Triballi grave was found together with ceramics (urns) in Požarevac, central-eastern Serbia. A tomb labeled as "Triballian" was unearthed at Ljuljaci, west of Kragujevac, central Serbia. In Bulgaria, a male grave at Vratsa dated to the 4th century BC has been unearthed; the royal tomb contains beautiful goldwork, like pitchers and wreaths. These findings are labeled as "Triballian" in Yugoslav and post-Yugoslav archaeology based on the definitions of Triballian territory by Fanula Papazoglu (1978) who constructed a Triballian area which in reality is undeterminable via available data. In turn, archaeologists of that era in Yugoslavia began to categorize all finds in the area defined as Triballian by Papazoglu as artifacts of the Triballi tribe. Based on Papazoglu, a periodization of Triballian finds was proposed: Proto-Triballian (1300–800 BC), Early Triballian (800–600 BC), Triballian (600–335 BC) and period from 335 BC until Roman conquest.

== Legacy ==
=== Exonym of Serbs ===
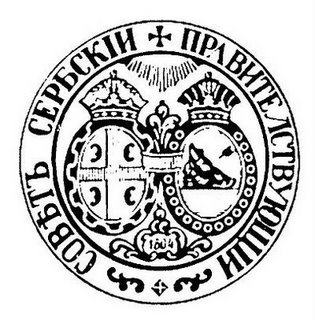
The Seal of the Serbian Government, 1805

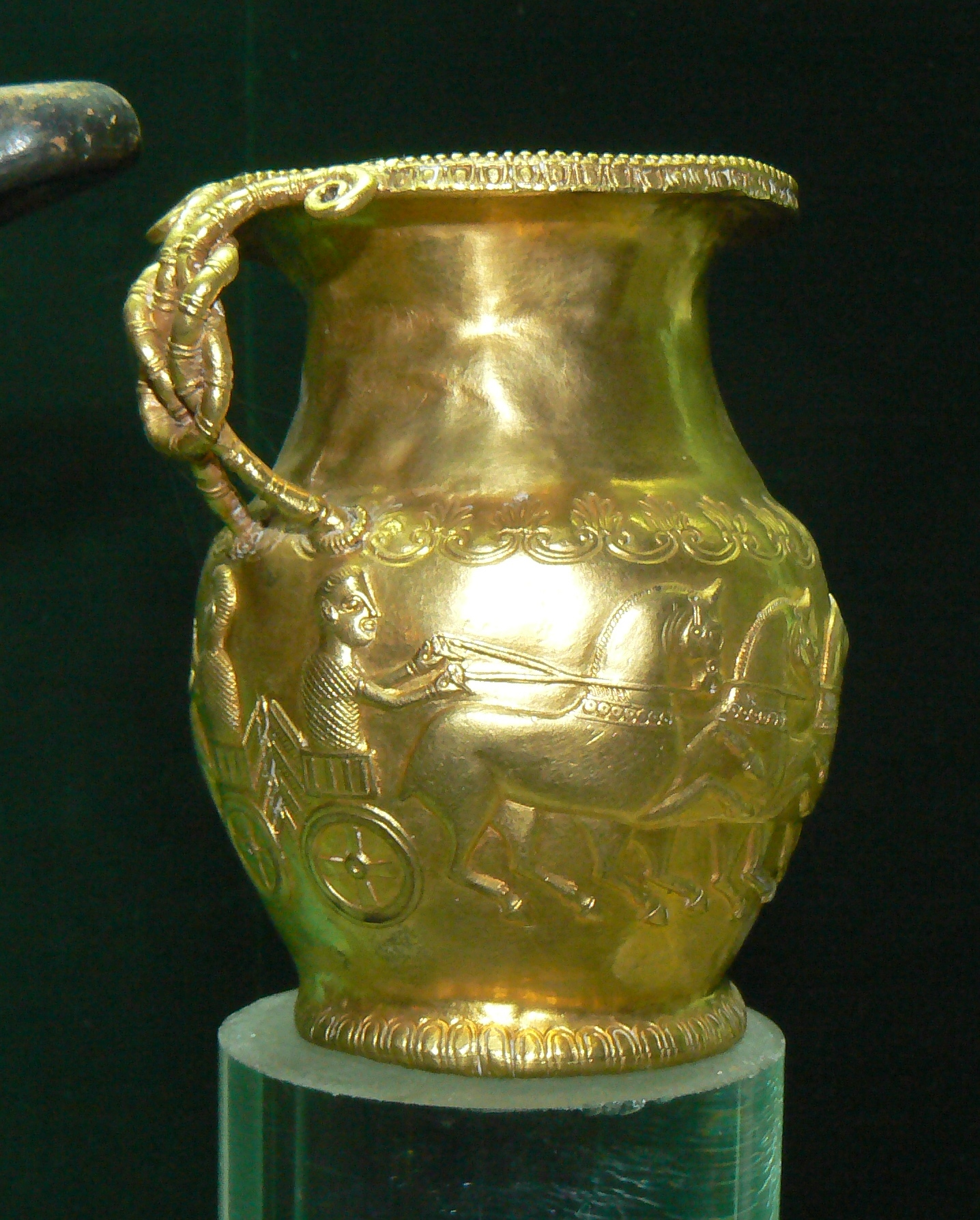
Golden pitcher from Vratsa

The term "Triballians" appears frequently in Byzantine and other European works of the Middle Ages, referring to Serbs, as the Byzantines sought to create an ancient name for the Serbs. Some of these authors clearly explain that "Triballian" is synonym to "Serbian". For example, Niketas Choniates (or Acominatus, 1155–1215 or-16) in his history about Emperor Ioannes Komnenos: "... Shortly after this, he campaigned against the nation of Triballians (whom someone may call Serbians as well) ..." or the much later Demetrios Chalkokondyles (1423–1511), referring to an Islamized Christian noble: "... This Mahmud, son of Michael, is Triballian, which means Serbian, by his mother, and Greek by his father." or Mehmed the Conqueror when referring to the plundering of Serbia.

Mihailo Vojislavljević succeeded as Knez of "Duklja" in 1046, or as his realm was called by contemporary Cedrenus: "Triballorum ac Serborum principatum". According to George Kedrenos (fl. 1050s) and John Skylitzes (fl. 1057), he was the Prince of Triballians and Serbs (Τριβαλλών και Σέρβων...αρχηγός/ Τριβαλλῶν καὶ Σέρβων...ἀρχηγός).

In the 15th century, a coat of arms of "Tribalia", depicting a wild boar with an arrow pierced through the head (see Boars in heraldry), appeared in the supposed coat of arms of Emperor Stefan Dušan 'the Mighty' (r. 1331–1355). The motif had, in 1415, been used as the coat of arms of the Serbian Despotate and is recalled in one of Stefan Lazarević's personal Seals, according to the paper Сабор у Констанци. Pavao Ritter Vitezović also depicts "Triballia" with the same motif in 1701 and Hristofor Zhefarovich again in 1741.

With the beginning of the First Serbian Uprising, the Parliament adopted the Serbian coat of arms in 1805, their official seal depicted the heraldic emblems of Serbia and Tribalia.

Even though the two names were used as synonyms by some Byzantine sources and certain heraldic inheritance, Serbian official historiography does not equalate the Serbs and the Triballi, nor does it fabricate a cultural continuity between the two.

Tribals and Tribalia are often identified in a historical context with Serbs and Serbia, as these interpretations refer only to Laonikos Chalkokondyles of the 15th century, who often resorted to archaisms in his historical writings that have come down to us (Mizi, Illyrians, etc.) to indicate the subjects of the individual rulers, without attaching ethnic meaning to their content.

=== Exonym of Bulgarians ===
Marin Barleti (1450–1513), wrote in his biography of Skanderbeg (published between 1508 and 1510), that the father of Skanderbeg's mother Voisava was a "Triballian nobleman" (pater nobilissimus Triballorum princeps). In another chapter, when talking about the inhabitants of Upper Debar that defended Svetigrad, he calls them "Bulgarians or Triballi" (Bulgari sive Tribali habitant). In Barleti's work, Triballian is used as a synonym for Bulgarians.

=== Romanian geographic name ===
In Romania, "Tribalia" refers to the Timok Valley region split between Serbia and Bulgaria in which the Romanian-speaking Vlachs live.

== Sources ==
=== Primary ===
- Aristotle, Topica, LCL 391: 378-379
- Demosthenes, Orations 54. Ariston against Conon, an Action for Assault, LCL 351: 156-157
- Appian, Roman History 9.2. The Illyrian Book LCL 3: 304-305

=== Modern ===
- Biçoku, Kasëm (2007). "Peshkopata e Arbnit dhe Kastriotët [The bishopric of Arbni and the Kastriots]". Studime Historike. 03–04.
- Bouzek, J. and Ondřejová, I., 1990. The Rogozen treasure and the art of the Triballoi. Eirene, 27, pp. 81–91.
- Jevtic, Milos (2006). "Sacred groves of the tribali on Miroc mountain". Starinar (56): 271–290. doi:10.2298/STA0656271J.
- Jevtic, Milos; Pekovic, Mirko (2007). "Mihajlov ponor on Miroc: Tribal cult places". Starinar (57): 191–219. doi:10.2298/STA0757191P.
- Mihailović, Vladimir (2014). "Tracing Ethnicity Backwards: the case of the "Central Balkan Tribes"". In Popa, Catalin; Stoddart, Simon (eds.). Fingerprinting the Iron Age: Approaches to identity in the European Iron Age: Integrating South-Eastern Europe into the debate. Oxbow Books. pp. 97–107. ISBN 978-1782976783.
- Noli, Fan S. (1947), George Castrioti Scanderbeg (1405–1468), New York: International Universities Press, OCLC 732882
- Papazoglu, Fanula (1978). The Central Balkan Tribes in pre-Roman Times: Triballi, Autariatae, Dardanians, Scordisci and Moesians. Amsterdam: Hakkert. ISBN 9789025607937.
- Stojić, M. (2001). "Kulturne tradicije na prostoru na kome će se formirati i razvijati Tribali". Zbornik Radova Filozofskog Fakulteta u Prištini. 31: 253–264.
- Vasić, Rastko (1972). "Notes on the Autariatae and Triballi". Balcanica (III).
- Vasić, Rastko (1992). "Pages from the history of the Autoriatae and Triballoi". Balcanica (XXIII).
