= Ed Smith =

Ed, Eddie, Edward, Edwin, and similar, surnamed Smith, may refer to:

== Military ==
- Edward H. Smith (sailor) (1889–1961), US Coast Guard admiral, oceanographer and Arctic explorer
- Edward Smith (VC) (1898–1940), English recipient of the Victoria Cross during the First World War
- Edwin P. Smith (born 1945), U.S. general, commander of Army, Pacific 1998–2002
- Edwin Smith (Medal of Honor) (c. 1841–?), American Civil War sailor and Medal of Honor recipient

== Politics and law ==
- E. D. Smith (1853–1948), Canadian businessman and politician
- Ed Smith (alderman), alderman for Chicago's 28th ward
- Eddie Smith (politician) (born 1979), member of the Tennessee House of Representatives
- Edward Clarke Smith (1864–1924), mayor of Manchester, New Hampshire
- Edward Curtis Smith (1854–1935), governor of Vermont
- Edward Dunlap Smith (1807–1883), Presbyterian clergyman and chaplain of the US House of Representatives
- Edward Everett Smith (1861–1931), lieutenant governor of Minnesota
- Edward G. Smith (1961–2023), American judge in Pennsylvania
- Edward H. Smith (politician) (1809–1885), U.S. representative from New York
- Edward J. Smith (American politician) (1927–2010), member of the Rhode Island House of Representatives
- Edward J. Smith (Canadian politician) (1819–1903), merchant and political figure in New Brunswick, Canada
- Edward Smith (New Zealand politician) (1839–1907), New Zealand armourer and Liberal Party politician
- Edward McMurray Smith (1870–1953), Iowa Secretary of State and newspaper editor
- Edward O. Smith (1817–1892), American pioneer, businessman and politician
- Edward Parsons Smith (1860–1930), mayor of Omaha, Nebraska, 1918–1921
- Edward Percy Smith (1891–1968), British Conservative member of parliament for Ashford, 1943–1950
- Edward Samuel Smith (1919–2001), U.S. federal judge
- Edward Smith (trade unionist) (1954–2024), of Springfield, Sangamon County, Ill
- Edward Smith (judge) (1602–1682), chief justice of the Irish Common Pleas
- Edward Smith (MP) (c. 1704–1762), English member of parliament for Leicestershire, 1734–1762
- Edward "Smitty" Smith (born 1980), candidate for attorney general of the District of Columbia
- Edwin C. Smith (1852–1924), miner, rancher and political figure in British Columbia
- Edwin O. Smith (c. 1871–1960), American politician in the Connecticut House of Representatives
- Edwin Thomas Smith (1830–1919), South Australian politician
- Ellison D. Smith (1864–1944), nicknamed "Cotton Ed", U.S. senator from South Carolina
- Edward Smith (governor), army officer and governor of the Isle of Man
- Edward Smith (Illinois politician), 19th century Illinois state representative
- Sir Edward Smith, 1st Baronet (c. 1630–1707), English landowner and politician
- Ed Smith (Canadian politician) (1928-2010), Canadian politician in British Columbia
- Edward Delafield Smith (1826–1878), American lawyer and US Attorney
- Edward L. Smith (1875–1923), Connecticut judge, mayor and US Attorney

== Sports ==
=== American football ===
- Ed Smith (running back) (1913–1998), player, model for the Heisman Trophy
- Ed Smith (halfback) (1923–2010), fullback in the American National Football League
- Ed Smith (quarterback) (born 1956), quarterback
- Ed Smith (defensive end) (born 1950), defensive end
- Ed Smith (linebacker) (born 1957), linebacker
- Ed Smith (tight end) (born 1969), basketball and American football player
- Edwin Smith or Alex Smith (tight end) (born 1982), player
- Ted Smith (footballer, born 1880) or Edward Smith (1880–1954), English football player

=== Association football ===
- Eddie Smith (footballer) (1929–1993), English footballer
- Eddie Smith (referee) (born 1965), Scottish football referee
- Edwin Smith (footballer), English footballer for Crystal Palace

=== Baseball ===
- Ed Smith (1880s pitcher) (1863–1948), Baltimore Monumentals baseball player
- Ed Smith (1900s pitcher) (1879–1956), St. Louis Browns baseball player
- Eddie Smith (pitcher) (1913–1994), pitcher
- Eddie Smith (baseball coach) (born 1984), American baseball coach

=== Cricket ===
- Ed Smith (cricketer) (born 1977), English cricketer
- Edward Smith (cricketer, born 1831) (1831–1899), English cricketer
- Edward Smith (cricketer, born 1854) (1854–1909), English cricketer and clergyman
- Edward Smith (cricketer, born 1868) (1868–1937), English cricketer and British Army officer
- Edward Smith (cricketer, born 1911) (1911–1999), Australian cricketer
- Edwin Smith (cricketer, born 1934) (1934–2026), Derbyshire cricketer
- Edwin Smith (cricketer, born 1848) (1848–1880), English cricketer
- Edwin Smith (cricketer, born 1860) (1860–1939), English cricketer

=== Other sports ===
- Ed Smith (basketball) (1929–1998), New York Knicks basketball player
- Ed Smith (streetball player) (born c. 1973), American streetball player
- Eddie Smith (cyclist) (1926–1997), Australian cyclist
- Eddie Smith (basketball) (born 1983), basketball player
- Edwin Smith (rower) (1922–1997), New Zealand rower, silver medalist at the 1950 Empire Games
- Ed Smith (hurdler) (born 1918), American hurdler, 1939 110 m hurdles NCAA runner-up for the Wisconsin Badgers track and field team

== Engineers and scientists ==
- Edward Smith (physician) (1819–1874), British physician and medical writer
- Edwin Smith (metallurgist) (1931–2010), British metallurgy scientist
- Edwin Smith (astronomer) (1851–1912), American astronomer

== Writers and the arts ==
- E. E. Smith (1890–1965), better known as E.E. "Doc" Smith, science fiction author
- Eden Smith (1858–1949), Canadian architect
- Edward Smith (biographer) (1839–1919), English biographer
- Edward Gordon Smith (1857–1906), British postcard publisher
- Edward Wyke Smith (1871–1935), English author, mining engineer and adventurer
- Edwin Dalton Smith (1800–?), English artist and engraver
- Edwin Smith (Egyptologist) (1822–1906), American antiquities collector
- Edwin Smith (photographer) (1912–1971), English photographer
- Edwin W. Smith (1876–1957), South African born missionary, anthropologist and writer in Africa
- Ed Smith (sculptor) (born 1956), American sculptor and printmaker
- Ed Smith (writer) (died 2017), Canadian author
- Edward Tyrrel Smith (1804–1877), British businessman and showman

== Others ==
- Eddie Smith (trade unionist) (died 1945), British trade union leader
- Edward Smith (sea captain) (1850–1912), captain of the RMS Titanic when she sank
- Edward Smith (thief), committed one of the first bank robberies in the US
- Edward B. Smith, founder of Edward B. Smith & Co., became brokerage firm Smith Barney
- Edward Parmelee Smith (1827–1876), Congregational minister in Massachusetts
- Edward Shrapnell Smith (1875–1952), British pioneer and promoter of commercial road transport
- Edwin Smith (architect) (1870–1965), New South Wales Government Architect 1929–1935
- Edwin Mitchell Smith (1847–1929), surveyor general of South Australia
- Eddie Smith, murder victim; see Jeffrey Dahmer

== See also ==
- Ted Smith (disambiguation)
- Edgar Smith (disambiguation)
- Edmund Smith (disambiguation)
- Edward Smyth (disambiguation)
- Edward Smythe (disambiguation)
