= Ted Smith =

Ted Smith may refer to:

- Ted Smith (American football) (1954–2025), All-American football player at Ohio State University
- Ted Smith (art director) (1886–1949), American art director
- Ted Smith (Canadian painter) (1933-2016), landscape artist
- Ted Smith (conservationist) (1920–2015), British conservation pioneer and English teacher
- Ted Smith (cyclist) (1928–1992), American Olympic cyclist
- Ted Smith (environmentalist) (born 1945), founder of the Silicon Valley Toxics Coalition
- Ted Smith (footballer, born 1880) (1880–1954), English footballer
- Ted Smith (footballer, born 1902) (1902–1976), English footballer
- Ted Smith (footballer, born 1914) (1914–1989), English football player and coach
- Ted Smith (soccer) (born 1935), Australian football (soccer) player
- Edwin Smith (rower) (1922–1997), also known as Ted, New Zealand rower
- Ted Smith Aerostar
- Ted R. Smith (1906–1976), aircraft designer
- Ted Smith (Australian footballer) (1887–1960), Australian rules footballer
- Ted Smith (footballer, born 1996), English footballer

== See also ==
- Teddy Smith (1932–1979), American jazz musician
- Theodore Smith (disambiguation)
- Ed Smith (disambiguation)
