= Theodore Smith =

Theodore Smith may refer to:

- Teddy Smith, American jazz double-bassist
- T. Parker Smith, American leader in business colleges
- Theodore Clarke Smith, professor of American history
- Ted R. Smith, American aircraft designer
- Theodore Smith (long jumper), winner of the long jump at the 1933 USA Indoor Track and Field Championships

== See also ==
- Ted Smith (disambiguation)
- Theo Smit, Dutch road bicycle racer
