= Edgar Smith =

Edgar Smith may refer to:

== Sports ==
- Edgar Smith (Boston Beaneaters outfielder) (Albert Edgar Smith, 1860–?), baseball player
- Edgar Smith (pitcher/outfielder) (Edgar Eugene Smith, 1862–1892), baseball player
- Eddie Smith (pitcher) (Edgar Smith, 1913–1994), baseball player
- Edgar Smith (rower) (born 1950), Canadian Olympic rower

== Others ==
- Edgar Albert Smith (1847–1916), British zoologist
- Edgar Fahs Smith (1854–1928), American scientist
- Edgar Smith (librettist) (Edgar McPhail Smith, 1857–1938), American writer and lyricist
- Edgar C. Smith (1870–1934), American jurist, author, and politician
- Edgar C. Smith (Wisconsin politician) (1852–1913), American state legislator
- Edgar Lawrence Smith (1882–1971), economist, investment manager and author
- Edgar Smith (murderer) (Edgar Herbert Smith, 1934–2017), American convicted murderer

== See also ==
- Ed Smith (disambiguation)
- Heber Smith (Heber Edgar Smith, 1915–1990), Canadian politician
- Edgar Smith Wigg (1818–1899), Australian bookseller
- Edgar Charles Bate-Smith (1900–1989), English chemist
