= Edward Shrapnell Smith =

Edward Shrapnell Smith (1875–1952) was a prominent pioneer and promoter of commercial road transport. After attending the inaugural meeting of the Self-propelled Traffic Association organised by David Salomons in London in 1895, Shrapnell Smith established the Liverpool branch on 26 October 1896. He joined Edmund Dangerfield on The Commercial Motor, being editor from its launch in March 1905.

Before 1928, he was President of the Commercial Motor Users' Association.
