= Butler International =

Engineering consulting firm

Butler Aerospace & Defense, LLC
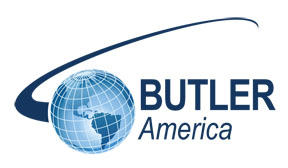
- Company type: Private
- Industry: Aerospace, defense
- Predecessor: Butler International, Inc.
- Founded: 1946
- Headquarters: Shelton, Connecticut, U.S.
- Number of locations: Connecticut, Florida, Indiana, Texas
- Area served: India, United States
- Services: Engineering technical support
- Website: butler.com

Butler International was a United States company in the airplane service, trucking, and technical-management industries. Founded as the Chicago, Illinois–based Butler Aviation in 1947, the company spread across the United States and acquired various other aviation companies, becoming by 1970 the country's largest aviation services company. In 1974, reflecting a diversity of business interests and services in Europe, it was renamed to Butler International. Once a "giant of the general aviation industry", the aviation division was sold in 1992 and merged in 1998 into Signature Flight Support, a company run by the British company Signature Aviation. The rest of the company was sold and ultimately declared bankruptcy in 2009, acquired by Butler America, (Note: Delaware company number 4690804) later Butler Aerospace & Defense, a subsidiary of Select Staffing. This successor company, now owned by Indian conglomerate HCL Technologies, works almost entirely as a technical and engineering support provider for Sikorsky Aircraft Corporation.

== History ==
=== As Butler Aviation ===
Butler Aviation was founded in Chicago in 1947 by Paul Butler, a businessman who also served as a lieutenant for the US Army Air Corps during World War I. The company expanded throughout the 1960s, including to New York City's LaGuardia Airport and Ronald Reagan Washington National Airport in Arlington, Virginia; by 1966 it had nine divisions, located in Baltimore; Boston; New York; San Francisco; Santa Monica; West Palm Beach; and three places in Chicago. The company offered fuels, aircraft maintenance, and a flight school. The company opened services in Europe in 1967. In 1967–8, the company was sold to Howell International Inc. (also known as Howell Electric Motors), an electric motors company, and reincorporated in Delaware; Howell renamed itself Butler Aviation International following the sale. Butler Aviation International acquired Miami-based aviation company Air International, also known as Aviation Investments Inc., in 1969, and later that year bought the Mooney Aircraft Corporation, an aircraft manufacturer. Butler also acquired the troubled Ted Smith Aircraft Company, maker of the twin-engine Ted Smith Aerostar, and in an attempt to save both companies, Butler merged it with Mooney to form the Aerostar Aircraft Corporation. The Mooney name was dropped in 1970 and its single-engine light aircraft were rebranded as Aerostars.

Butler formulated a plan to consolidate aircraft production at the Mooney plant in Kerrville, Texas, and close the Ted Smith plant in Van Nuys, California, but became mired in a dispute with the American Cement Company, the Ted Smith Aircraft Company's former owner, over alleged corrosion problems with the twin-engine Aerostar. The Federal Aviation Administration (FAA) investigated and found that no such problem existed, but the dispute resulted in the suspension of production and the cancellation of the plant relocation plan. Meanwhile, Ted R. Smith, the aircraft designer and founder of the company bearing his name, began a campaign to buy his design back and restart production.

By 1970 Butler was the US's largest seller of airplane fuel—about 300 million US gallons (1.136×10^{9} litres) a year—and a publicly traded company on the American Stock Exchange. However, the Aerostar Aircraft venture was not a success; Butler closed the Mooney plant in early 1971 and it remained closed for more than two years. Ted R. Smith and Associates bought back the dormant twin-engine Aerostar line in 1972. In October 1973, Republic Steel Corporation acquired the Mooney aircraft line, restored the Mooney Aircraft Corporation name, and resumed production in 1974. After some restructuring, and in the face of its accumulated diversity of services, in 1974 Butler was renamed "Butler International" and the aviation division made a subsidiary.

=== As Butler International ===
Butler International Transport, a subsidiary, was formed as a trucking division, and a contract-based technical help division, renamed in 1978 to Butler Service Group, provided technical and management support to airline, chemical, nuclear energy, and utility companies. The company saw continuous revenue and earnings growth from 1971 to 1978, reaching $3.60 million in net income in 1975, $5.5 million in 1977, and $6.8 million in 1978. The company acquired North American-TAB Inc., an Illinois-based communications and industry equipment company, in 1977.

The company, especially the trucking division, was hit hard by the early 1980s recession; in 1982 the company's income was $3.83 million, of which $1.99 million was from its aviation division, $1.01 million from its trucking division, $472,000 from Butler Service Group, and $353,000 from other sources. This figure recovered to $8.1 million in the first nine months of 1984.

=== Dissolution and Butler America ===
The trucking division was sold to Schneider National Inc., a Wisconsin-based company, in 1984. The company lost $1.6 million in income in the first nine months of 1985, compared to the previous year, mostly due to the sale (along with the sale of an insurance subsidiary). In November 1986, the company announced it would be acquired by North American Ventures, Inc. for $140 million. At the time, Butler employed about 10,000 people. North American Ventures ultimately sold the Butler Aviation International subsidiary to Acadia Partners, a Texas investment firm, for $65 million in cash and $11.75 million in stock, in 1989.

Butler Aviation merged with the Florida-based Page Avjet Airport Services Inc. in 1992, creating a new company, Signature Flight Support. By 1998 this company had become the largest US chain of fixed-base operators.

Around 1990, Butler started working with Sikorsky Aircraft Corporation. In 2005, Butler International opened a location in Purdue Research Park in West Lafayette, Indiana, where they provide engineering design work and technical support to Sikorsky. At the time, the company had 29 offices and 3000 employees.

In 2009, the rest of Butler International declared Chapter 11 bankruptcy and was acquired by Butler America, a subsidiary of Select Staffing, Inc.; the details of the deal were not made public. At the time, a spokesperson for the company stated the acquisition would have no impact on Butler's operations at their West Lafayette location.

In 2016, HCL Technologies acquired Butler America Aerospace for $85 million. Butler America Aerospace reported $85.4 million in revenue in 2015, with 900 engineers and seven design centers in the US. The sale did not include the staffing business of Butler America Inc.

== Services ==
=== Avpak ===
In mid 1974, Butler Aviation International introduced Avpak (stylized AVPAK), a same-day, door-to-door delivery service across 11 US and 1 Canadian cities, (Note: Baltimore, Boston, Chicago, Dallas, Detroit, Los Angeles, Miami, Montréal, New York, Newark, Reno, San Francisco, and West Palm Beach) using existing commercial flights. The service proved unprofitable and was discontinued in November 1975.

== Bibliography ==
- Simpson, R. W. (1991). Airlife's General Aviation. Shrewsbury, UK: Airlife Publishing. ISBN 1-85310-194-X.
