= Dominick Daly =

British Empire colonial administrator

Sir Dominick Daly
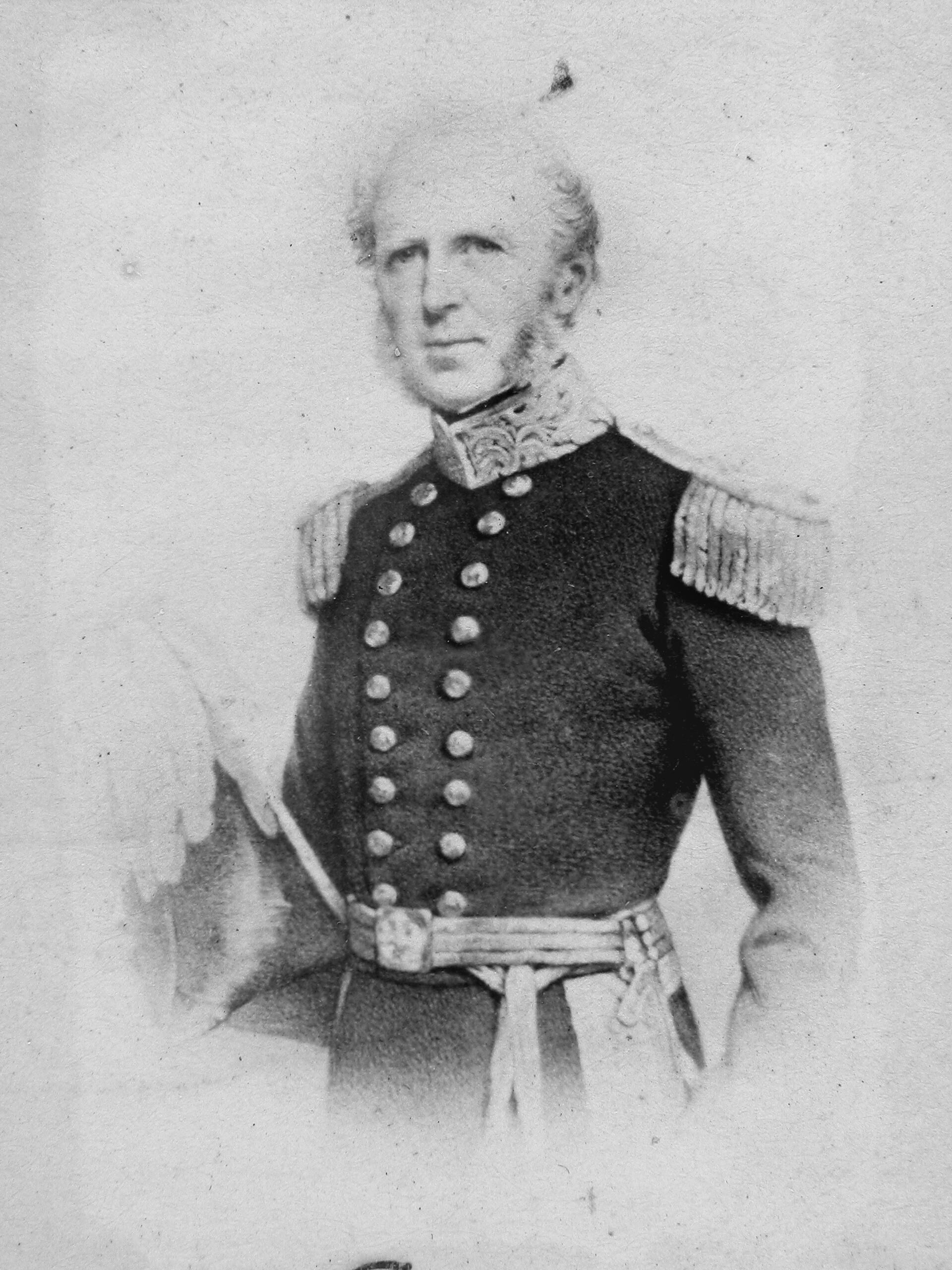
- Sir Dominick Daly, around 1861

Provincial Secretary of Lower Canada
- In office 1827 – 31 December 1843
- Monarch: Victoria
- Governors General: Earl of Dalhousie (1827–1828); Sir James Kempt (1828–1830); Lord Aylmer (1830–1835); Earl of Gosford (1835–1837); Lord Seaton (1837–1838); Lord Durham (1838–1839); Lord Sydenham (1839–1841); Major-General John Clitherow, Deputy (1841); Lieutenant-General Sir Richard Downes Jackson, Administrator (1841–1842); Sir Charles Bagot 1842)
- Lieutenant Governor: Sir Francis Nathaniel Burton (1827)
- Preceded by: Thomas Amyot (absentee)
- Succeeded by: Position abolished

Executive Council of Lower Canada
- In office 2 June 1838 – 10 February 1841
- Governors General: Lord Durham (1838–1839); Lord Sydenham (1839–1841)
- Succeeded by: Position abolished

Special Council of Lower Canada
- In office 16 April 1840 – 10 February 1841
- Governor General: Lord Sydenham
- Preceded by: None
- Succeeded by: Position abolished

Member of the Legislative Assembly of the Province of Canada for Megantick
- In office 1841 – 1849 (three elections)
- Preceded by: None; new position
- Succeeded by: Dunbar Ross

Member of the Executive Council of the Province of Canada
- In office 10 February 1841 – 10 March 1848
- Governors General: Lord Sydenham (1841); Major-General John Clitherow, Deputy (1841); Lieutenant-General Sir Richard Downes Jackson, Administrator (1841–1842); Sir Charles Bagot (1842–1843); Sir Charles Metcalfe (1843–1845); Earl Cathcart (1845–1847); Earl of Elgin (1847–1848)

Provincial Secretary of the Province of Canada
- In office 1 January, 1844 – 10 March, 1848
- Preceded by: None; new position
- Succeeded by: Robert Baldwin Sullivan

Lieutenant Governor of Tobago
- In office 1852–1854
- Preceded by: Henry Yates (acting)
- Succeeded by: Henry Yates (acting)

15th Governor of Prince Edward Island
- In office 11 July 1854 – 25 May 1859
- Preceded by: Alexander Bannerman
- Succeeded by: Charles Young (Administrator)

7th Governor of South Australia
- In office 4 March 1862 – 19 February 1868
- Preceded by: Richard Graves MacDonnell
- Succeeded by: Sir James Fergusson, 6th Baronet

Personal details
- Born: 11 August 1798 Ardfry, County Galway, Ireland
- Died: 19 February 1868 (aged 69) Adelaide, Colony of South Australia
- Resting place: West Terrace Cemetery, Adelaide
- Spouse: Caroline Maria Gore
- Children: 3 sons and 2 daughters, including Sir Malachy Bowes Daly and Caroline Louisa Daly
- Education: St Mary's College, Oscott
- Occupation: Public servant; colonial administrator
- Awards: Knight Bachelor, 1856
- Nickname: The Perpetual Secretary

Sir Dominick Daly (11 August 1798 – 19 February 1868) was a British colonial public servant and administrator during the 19th century, who held positions in British North America, Tobago and South Australia.

Born in Ireland to a well-connected family, he obtained the position of private secretary to the Lieutenant Governor of Lower Canada in 1822. He eventually became the provincial secretary of Lower Canada, a member of the Special Council which governed Lower Canada following the Lower Canada Rebellion, and a member of the Legislative Assembly and provincial secretary of the Province of Canada. For a brief time in 1843, he was the sole member of the Executive Council of the Province of Canada. He then became part of a three-man council, advising the Governor General, Sir Charles Metcalfe. His decision to remain in office angered the Reform members of the Assembly, leading to him fighting a duel with one Reform member. He was dismissed from office when the Reformers were returned to power under Louis-Hippolyte Lafontaine and Robert Baldwin in 1848.

After losing office in Canada in 1848, Daly served on a royal commission in England concerning the New Forest and Waltham Forest. He then served as the Governor of Tobago from 1851 to 1852, followed by appointment as Governor of Prince Edward Island from 1854 to 1859. In 1862 he was appointed Governor of South Australia, an office he held until his sudden death on 19 February 1868 in Adelaide, South Australia.

Daly combined an aptitude for public affairs and diligence in his work, along with personal charm and affability. In Canada, he acquired the nickname of "the perpetual secretary", in light of his holding various administrative offices for twenty-five years.

== Early life and family ==
Daly was born in Ardfry, County Galway, Ireland in 1798, the son of Dominic Daly senior and Joanna Harriet Blake. His mother was the sister of Joseph Blake, 1st Baron Wallscourt, and had previously been married to Richard Burke of Glinsk, who was a member of the family of Burke baronets. She had two sons from her first marriage, John Burke and Joseph Burke. Both of Daly's half-brothers inherited the baronetcy in turn. The Dalys were Roman Catholics and Dominick studied at St Mary's College, Oscott in Birmingham.

While in Lower Canada, Daly married Caroline Maria Gore, second daughter of Colonel Ralph Gore of Barrowmount, Goresbridge, County Kilkenny, Ireland, who was on service in Lower Canada. The marriage was conducted in the Anglican Cathedral of the Holy Trinity, Quebec City. They had five children, including the artist Caroline Louisa Daly, whose paintings have only recently been recognized as her own work. One of their sons, Malachy Bowes Daly, became a lawyer in Nova Scotia. He entered federal politics and was a Cabinet minister in Sir John A. Macdonald's ministry, and later was appointed the Lieutenant Governor of Nova Scotia.

== Canada (1823–1849) ==
=== Lower Canada (1823–1841) ===
After finishing his schooling, Daly spent some time with an uncle in Paris who was involved in banking, but came back to Ireland. He then acquired the position of private secretary to Sir Francis Nathaniel Burton, Lieutenant Governor of Lower Canada, who was from an Irish family with political connections. In 1823, Daly came to Lower Canada with Burton. Daly was a diligent worker and earned Burton's approval, to the point that Burton ensured Daly's appointment as provincial secretary for Lower Canada in 1827, even though Burton by then had left Lower Canada on indefinite leave. However, Daly was required to remit the salary for the post, £500 a year, to the former absentee office-holder, Thomas Amyot in England. Instead, Daly received the lucrative fees associated with the position. The arrangement was kept secret so the elected members of the Legislative Assembly would not know that the money was still going to the former absentee provincial secretary.

Daly continued in the position of provincial secretary during and after the Lower Canada Rebellion of 1837–1838. He was active in civil life, participating on various civil committees. Aided by his Catholic background, he followed Burton's example of building good personal relations with the French Canadian elites, and acquired a reputation for diligence and integrity, coupled with affability and gallantry. He expressed some sympathies for the concerns of the nationalists, but never took any formal position on the constitutional and political issues which underlay the Rebellion. Individuals and groups on both sides of the debate appear to have considered him to be sympathetic to their position.

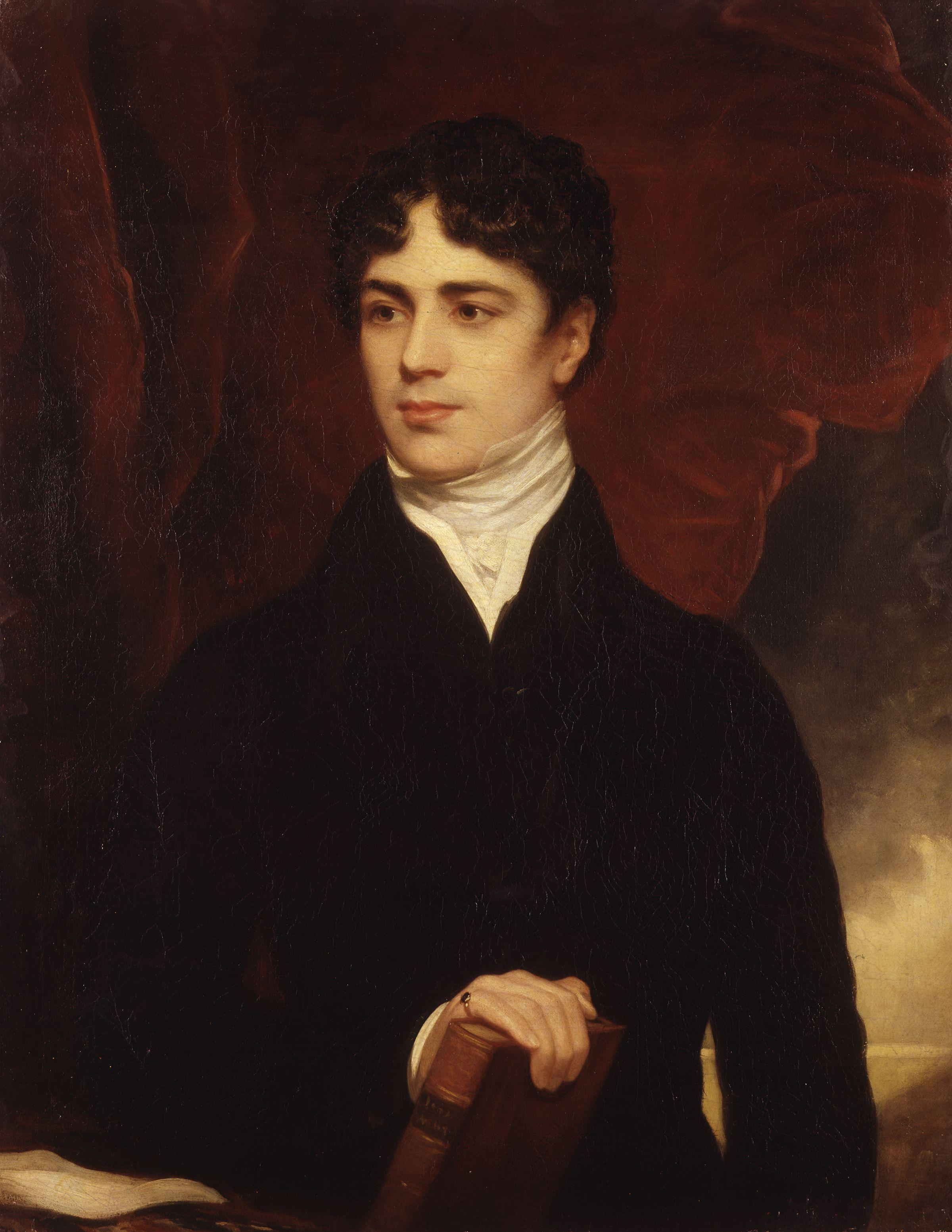
Lord Durham, who kept Daly in his position following the Rebellion

Following the Rebellion, the British Parliament passed a law to suspend the 1791 constitution of Lower Canada. The law gave the governor the power to appoint the members of the Special Council of Lower Canada to advise him on matters relating to Lower Canada. The governor and the Special Council together had the power to legislate for the province.

The British government appointed Lord Durham the Governor General of all of British North America, with a mandate to investigate the causes of the Rebellion in Lower Canada, and the related Upper Canada Rebellion of the same year. When Durham arrived, Daly was one of the few public servants in Lower Canada whom Lord Durham kept on in office, including appointing him to the Executive Council of Lower Canada in June, 1838. Daly worked closely with Lord Durham's advisors, particularly Edward Gibbon Wakefield, who was involved in the drafting of Lord Durham's Report. The Report recommended that Lower Canada and Upper Canada be joined into a single province.

Lord Durham completed his report and then resigned in 1839. He was succeeded as Governor General by Charles Thomson, later Lord Sydenham. In 1840, Sydenham appointed Daly to the Special Council of Lower Canada, a post he held until the union of the Canadas came into force in 1841.

=== Province of Canada (1841–1849) ===
==== Election to the Legislative Assembly, 1841 ====
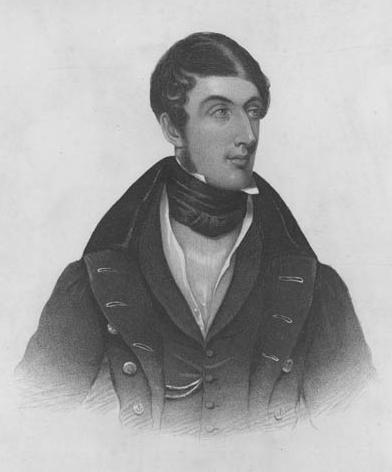
Lord Sydenham, who required Daly to enter electoral politics

In response to the rebellions in Lower Canada and Upper Canada (now Ontario), the British government decided to merge the two provinces into a single province, as recommended by Lord Durham in his Report. The Union Act, 1840, passed by the British Parliament, abolished the two provinces and their separate parliaments, and created the Province of Canada, with a single parliament for the entire province, composed of an elected Legislative Assembly and an appointed Legislative Council. The Governor General retained a strong position in the government.

In the government of Lower Canada, the position of provincial secretary had been regarded as a non-partisan public service position. However, in the new government of the Province of Canada, Lord Sydenham considered that the provincial secretary should be a member of the Legislative Assembly and the Executive Council. In the general election of 1841, Sydenham persuaded Daly to stand for election in the riding of Megantick in Canada East (formerly Lower Canada). Daly was elected without opposition as a supporter of the union, and Sydenham then appointed Daly as appointed provincial secretary of Canada East and a member of the Executive Council of the Province of Canada.

For the first two years of the union, the different groups in the Assembly and the Executive Council found Daly an acceptable colleague. In the first session, he voted in favour of the union, and thereafter was a consistent supporter of the governor. Sydenham's first ministry in 1841 was composed of Compact Tories, Reformers, and general supporters of the governor, while the new ministry formed in 1842 was dominated by Reformers. Daly got along well with all. He applied himself with his normal diligence and considered that his role was to give advice in Council based on his long experience in government. He did not speak frequently in the Assembly. Although he was an excellent conversationalist in individual settings, he was not a good public speaker. His tenacity in holding office earned him the nickname "the perpetual secretary", but he was nonetheless a popular and convivial character.

==== Ministerial crisis, 1843–1844 ====
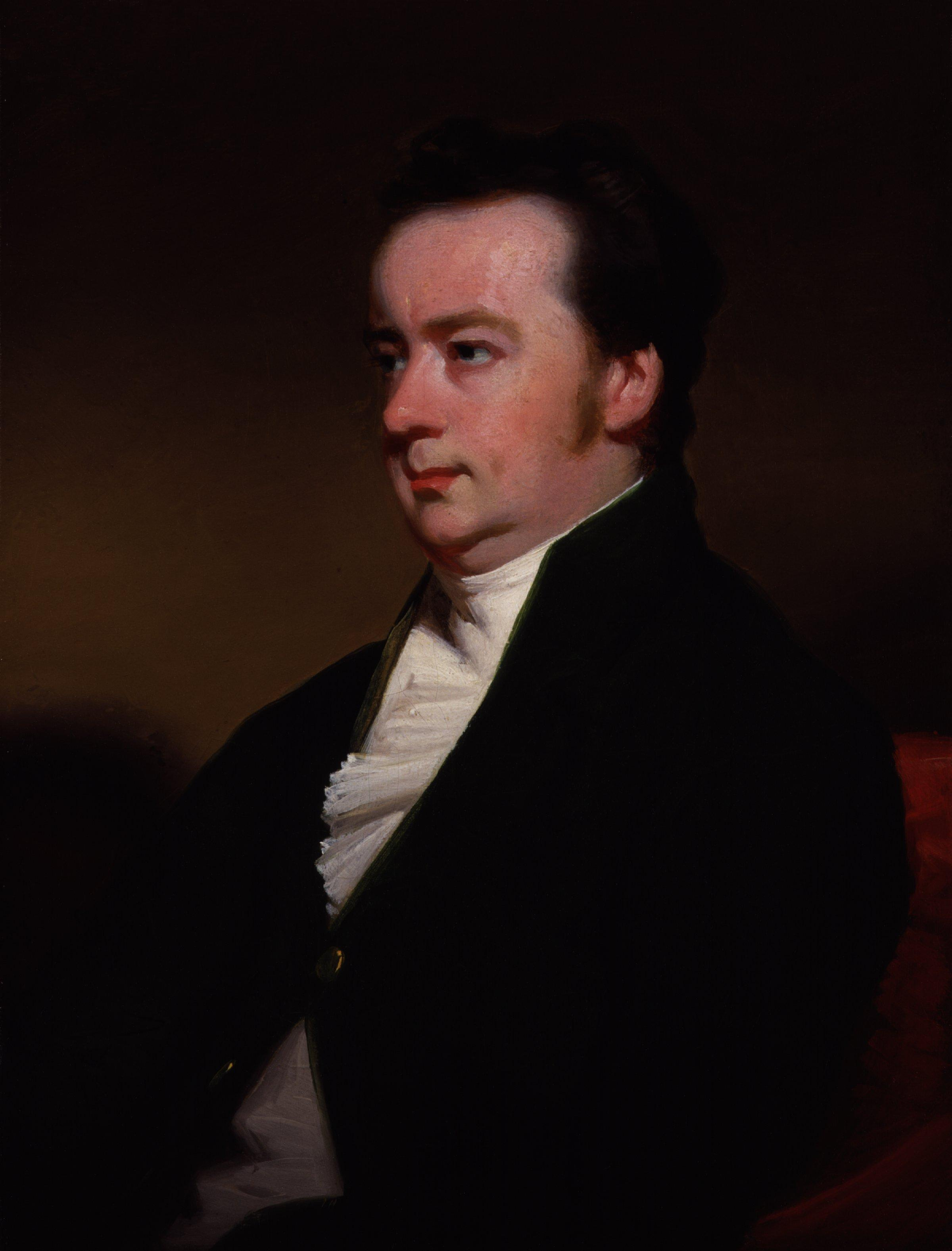
Governor General Metcalfe, whom Daly supported in the 1843 crisis

The situation changed when there was a political crisis in 1843. The new Governor General, Sir Charles Theophilus Metcalfe, was determined to retain the prerogatives of the Crown, particularly in the area of appointments to government offices, to ensure the government was based on Crown supporters. The Reformers, led by Louis-Hippolyte Lafontaine from Canada East and Robert Baldwin from Canada West, were equally determined to implement the system of responsible government, where the governor would follow the advice of the Executive Council, drawn from the group which had the support of a majority in the elected Legislative Assembly. At first, there were manoeuverings behind the scenes. When it started to appear to some Reformers that Daly would likely side with the governor in a dispute, the Assembly held an inquiry into some of Daly's activities as provincial secretary, including the old arrangement where he remitted his salary to the previous absentee secretary. He was defended in the Assembly by Wakefield, who increasingly was moving from the French-Canadian Group to the group of supporters of the governor. The Assembly committee exonerated Daly, but the proceedings hinted that there was a rift within the Executive Council.

The dispute came to a head when Metcalfe made appointments without following the Council's advice. LaFontaine, Baldwin, and the other members of the Executive Council resigned en masse in November 1843, with the exception of Daly. As the sole member of the Council, Daly was the acting head of government for several weeks. In December 1843, Governor General Metcalfe was able to persuade two others members of the Assembly to join the Council: William Draper from Canada West, and Denis-Benjamin Viger from Canada East. The Council, composed of Daly, Draper and Viger, ran the government of the province for several months, under the direction of Metcalfe. The three councillors did not have to account to the Assembly for their conduct of the government, because Metcalfe prorogued the Assembly. It did not meet again prior to dissolution and the general election of 1844. Metcalfe appointed Daly as Provincial Secretary of the Province of Canada, effective January 1, 1844.

The Reformers viewed Daly's decision to stay in office as a betrayal. However, it appears that for the first time in his long career, Daly had been forced to assess his own political views. For the previous twenty years, he had served the governors appointed by the Crown, as a member of the public service. The transition to a political office, as required by Sydenham, did not change his fundamental outlook, namely to support the governor who represented the Crown. He considered himself to be a non-political public servant. The Reformers disagreed, taking the position that a non-political public servant could not be a member of the Council.

==== Provincial Secretary and dismissal, 1844–1849 ====
In the 1844 election, the Reformers were defeated by those who supported Governor General Metcalfe. Lafontaine consolidated his position in Canada East, but not enough to make up for the considerable Reform losses in Canada West. Metcalfe was able to form a new government without LaFontaine and Baldwin. Daly had been re-elected in Megantick as a supporter of the governor, and Metcalfe kept him in the Executive Council. In the Assembly, he was a reliable vote for the governor. Resentment over Daly's conduct continued to fester. In March 1845, Daly was challenged to a duel by Reformer Thomas Cushing Aylwin over Daly's refusal to resign in 1843; shots were fired but no one was injured.

There was another political shift in 1848, with the appointment of Lord Elgin as governor-general. The British government had finally accepted that responsible government had to be implemented in the British North American provinces, as recommended by Lord Durham, ten years earlier. Lord Elgin's instructions were to appoint the government from the political group which had a majority in Assembly. Following the election of 1848, the Reformers under La Fontaine and Baldwin formed the majority, and Lord Elgin followed their advice in the appointment of the Executive Council. Daly had been re-elected in the Megantick riding, but resigned along with the rest of the outgoing members of the defeated government. The "perpetual secretary" had lost his job, after twenty-five years.

Lord Elgin was sympathetic to Daly's position, and wrote to the Colonial Secretary, urging the British government to find some appointment for Daly. Elgin pointed out that Daly had been required to enter the political arena by Governor-General Sydenham, thereby risking his position as a public servant. He had also stood by Governor-General Metcalfe in his dispute with the Reformers, which had led to his dismissal from the Council. Based on assurances from Lord Elgin, Daly returned to England and sought office from the Colonial Office. However he took advice from Wakefield, also back in England, who gave him excessively large expectations. Daly's lobbying efforts were unsuccessful, and the Colonial Secretary refused to give him any position. Instead, in 1849 the British government appointed Daly to a commission of inquiry into the management of the New Forest and Waltham Forest. On receiving that appointment, Daly's seat in the Canadian Parliament became vacant.

== Tobago ==
The forest commission wrapped up its work in 1851. In 1852, Daly was appointed lieutenant-governor of Tobago. However, he resigned the position after only six months, for health reasons.

== Prince Edward Island ==
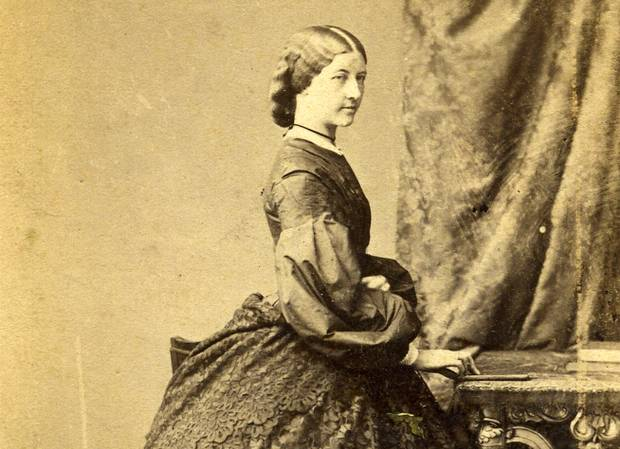
Caroline Louise Daly, water-colour artist of Prince Edward Island

In 1854, Daly was appointed Lieutenant Governor of Prince Edward Island, the first Catholic governor on the Island. He received a warm welcome when he arrived. The Island had only received responsible government in 1851, and the Conservative government was defeated at the polls shortly after Daly arrived. The premier, John Myrie Holl, resigned in accordance with the principle of responsible government, and was replaced by George Coles and the Liberals, who stayed in power for Daly's time on the Island. He was a popular governor generally, although the Conservatives, who were mainly Protestants, distrusted him, while the Catholic Liberals generally got along with him. In 1858, he announced his resignation as lieutenant governor, and left the Island the next year, generally considered a popular governor.

Daly's daughter Caroline was an accomplished amateur painter, using water-colours. During the family's time on the Island, she painted several paintings of the scenery and buildings in Charlottetown and surrounding areas. Some of her paintings of Government House in Charlottetown were used a century later to assist in reconstruction efforts. Over the years, her artistic role was forgotten, and her paintings were attributed to male artists with similar names, but who had no connection to Prince Edward Island. It was not until 2017 that the paintings were properly attributed to Caroline Daly, in a showing put on by the Confederation Centre Art Gallery, entitled "Introducing Caroline Louise Daly."

== South Australia (1861–1868) ==
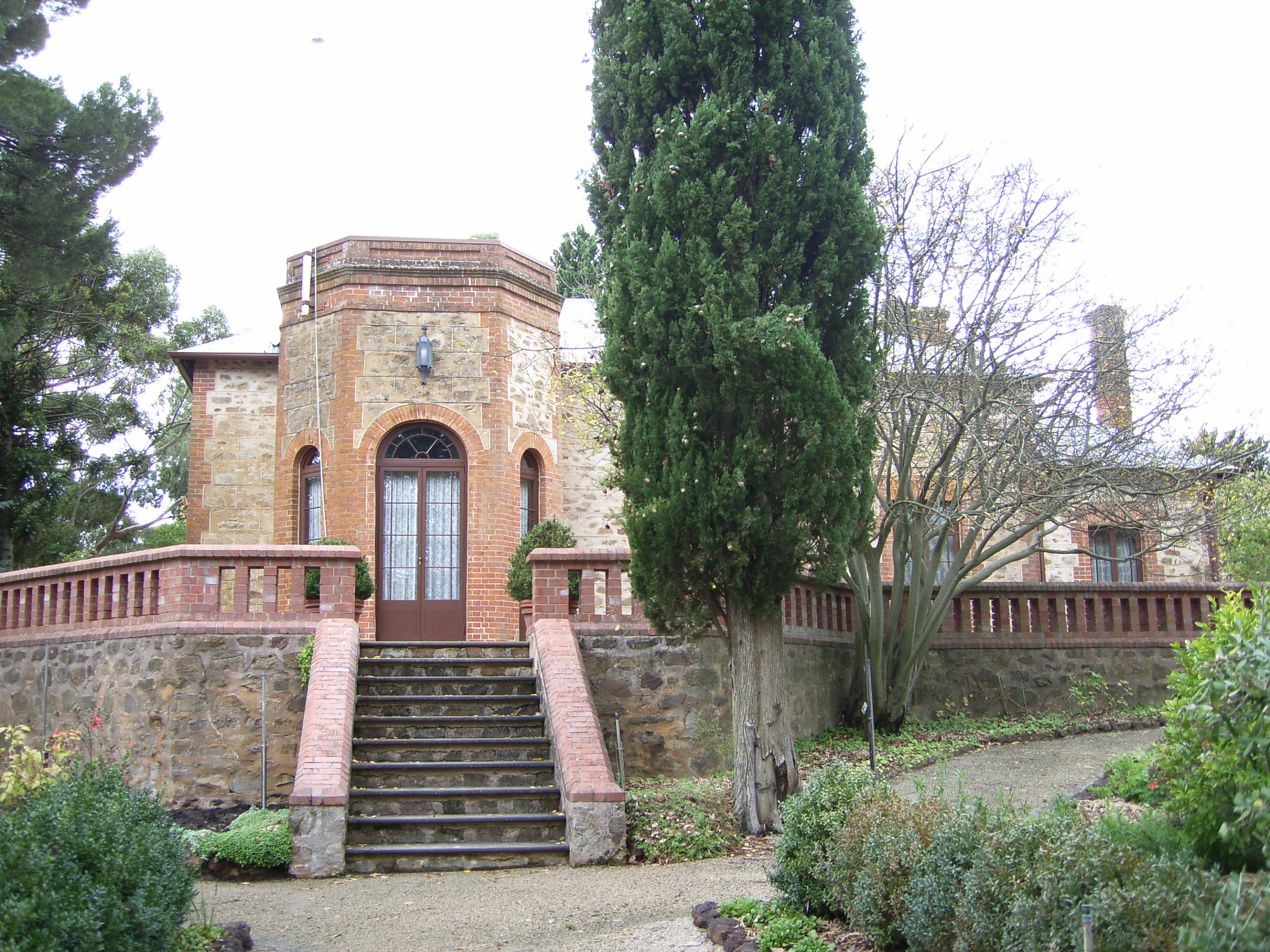
Old Government House, South Australia, summer residence of the governors

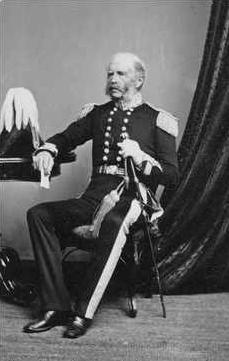
Daly in later life

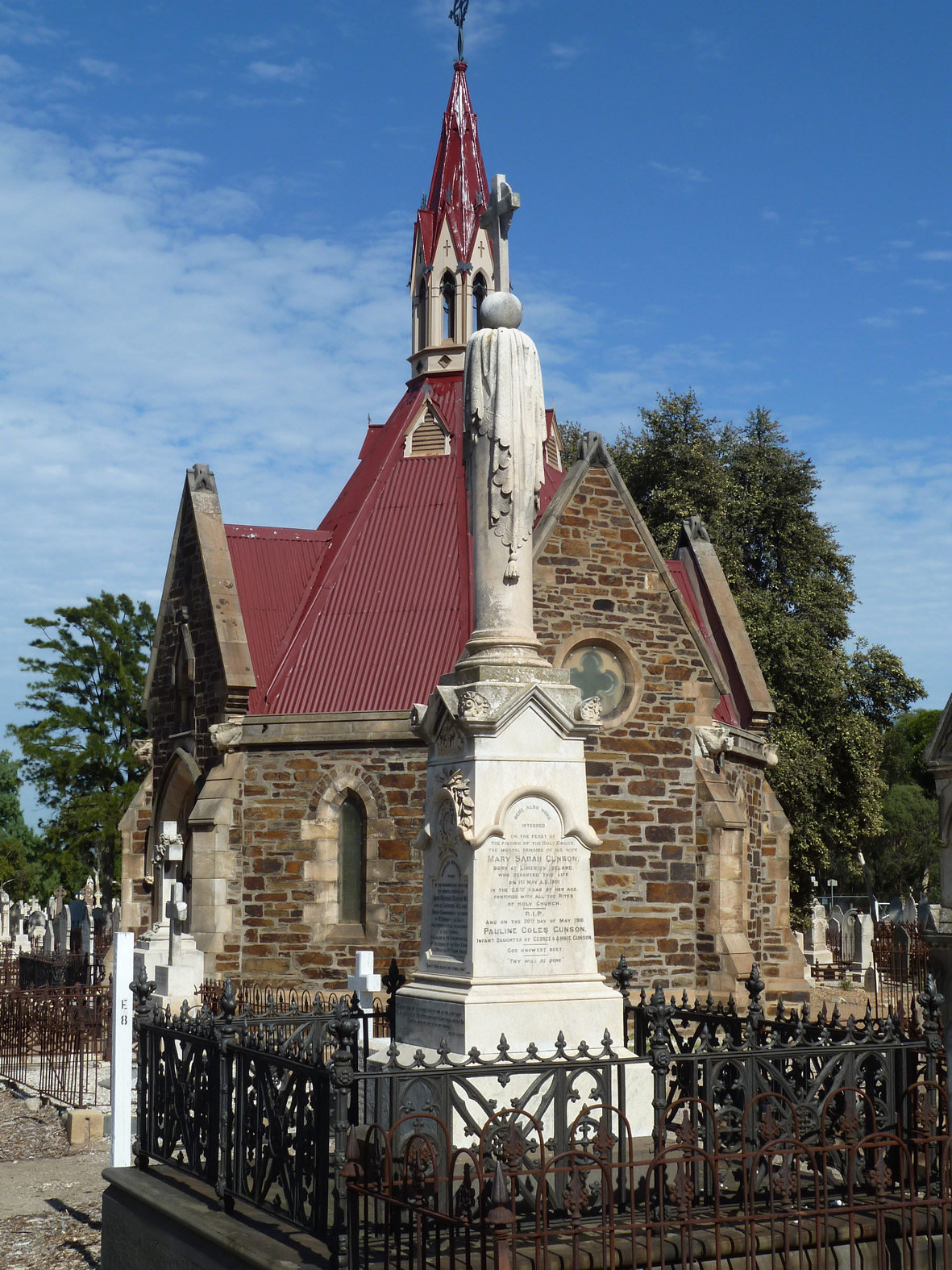
Catholic section of the West Terrace Cemetery, Adelaide, where Daly is buried

In October 1861, Daly was appointed the Governor of South Australia, becoming the first Catholic governor in Australia, notably in a colony with a smaller proportion of Catholics amongst its population than any other of the Australian provinces. Presumably on account of his religion, he was not given an official reception when he and his wife and daughters arrived. Nonetheless, as in Canada, he quickly earned the respect and affection of the public, due to his charm, good nature and integrity.

Politics in South Australia were somewhat tumultuous, as the colony had only been granted responsible government in 1857. During Daly's tenure, there were nine changes in government. In addition, there were also the difficulties caused by one of the judges of the Supreme Court of South Australia, Benjamin Boothby, who took a very broad view of the application of English law to South Australia, and a very narrow view of the powers of the Parliament of South Australia, striking down several South Australian laws. Resolutions were passed by the two houses of the South Australian Parliament, urging the British government to remove Boothby. Eventually, in 1867, Daly began proceedings under a British statute of 1782 to dismiss Boothby on grounds of misbehaviour. Following the hearings, Governor Daly and the Executive Council "amoved" Boothby forthwith. Boothby filed an appeal to the Judicial Committee of the Privy Council, but died before the appeal could be heard.

Daly began to show effects of anaemia in the last months of his life. He died in office just after noon on 19 February 1868 in Adelaide after unexpectedly falling ill that morning. He was reported as being in failing health prior to his sudden illness. Despite the intense heat, large crowds turned out to watch the funeral cortège pass, a tribute to the affection with which he was held. South Australians had come to know him as a kindly and accessible gentleman, dedicated to his duty, and cheerfully impartial as governor.

His wife outlived Daly by four years, in spite of a stroke which left her paralysed. She died at Glenelg, South Australia, on 16 July, 1872.

== Honours and recognition ==
- 1856: knighted by Queen Victoria

The following Australian geographic features were named after Daly:

- 1862: Daly Waters, Northern Territory
- 1862: County of Daly, South Australia
- 1862: Daly Head, Yorke Peninsula, South Australia
- 1865: Daly River, Northern Territory

== See also ==
1st Parliament of the Province of Canada

== Political summary ==
Political offices
Preceded by Robert Baldwin as Premier of Canada West	Joint Premiers of the Province of Canada - Canada West; 1843	Succeeded by William Henry Draper as Premier of Canada West
Preceded by Louis-Hippolyte Lafontaine as Premier of the Provinces of Canada	Joint Premiers of the Province of Canada - Canada East; 1843	Succeeded by Denis-Benjamin Viger
