= Caroline Louisa Daly =

Canadian artist

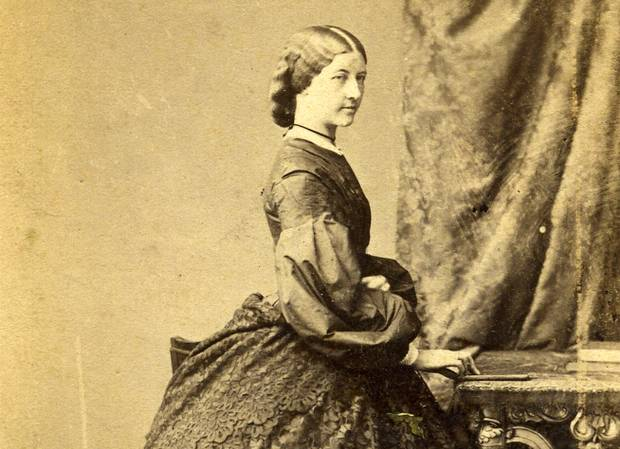
- Born: 6 December 1832; Lower Canada
- Died: 9 October 1893 (aged 60); Bournemouth, England
- Known for: painter
- Spouse: Henry Hobhouse Turton (d. 1893)

Caroline Louisa Daly (1832–1893) was a Canadian artist born in Lower Canada, whose work is featured in one of eastern Canada's prominent galleries, the Confederation Centre Art Gallery in Charlottetown, Prince Edward Island. Her watercolours were misattributed to men until 2017, when Paige Matthie, a curator with the gallery, established provenance through a detailed two-year historical review and report. Her investigation was triggered when one of Daly's great-grandsons visited the gallery and alerted gallery staff to a possible misattribution, based on his familiarity with Daly's work. Following the Matthie report, the gallery held a new public exhibition of Daly's paintings, to acknowledge their error and to celebrate Daly's art, entitled "Introducing Caroline Louise Daly".

== Life ==
Daly was born in Lower Canada on 6 December 1832 to Caroline Maria Gore and Sir Dominick Daly. Her parents were both from Ireland, but held numerous postings throughout the British Empire. She travelled extensively in her youth with her parents Her father was a colonial administrator, including twenty-five years in Lower Canada and the Province of Canada, and five years as Lieutenant Governor of Prince Edward Island. His last posting was as Governor of South Australia, where he died in 1868. Her mother died in South Australia in 1872.

In August 1866 Caroline and her sister Joanna were married in a double marriage at Government House in Adelaide: Joanna to John Souttar, and Caroline to Henry Hobhouse Turton. Turton was manager of the Savings Bank of South Australia and died in 1893. Point Turton, on the Yorke Peninsula of South Australia, was named in celebration of the double wedding. Caroline and Henry had two daughters, Caroline Mabel Turton (1874–1956) and Violet Gore Turton (1876–1963).

Daly died in Bournemouth, England, on 9 October 1893.

== Watercolour paintings ==
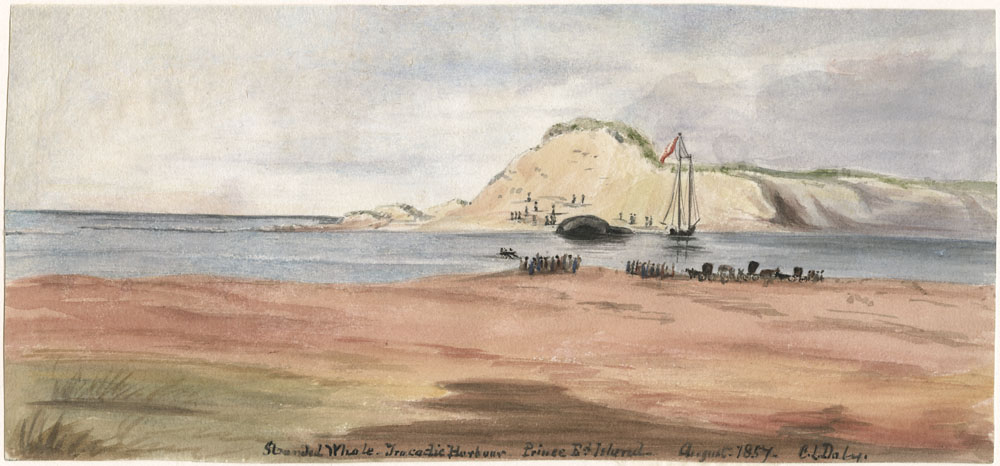
Stranded Whale, Tracadie Harbour, Prince Edward Island, c. 1857

Daly's watercolour paintings feature a range of subjects including natural scenes, a stranded whale, the interior of a cabin on a passenger ship, and images of the Prince Edward Island Government House in different seasons. In June 1863 she made a watercolour of the Government Cottage at Glenelg, South Australia. It was a summer residence of her father as governor of the state.

Her works are signed C. Daly or C. L. Daly. For years, they were incorrectly attributed to one of two men, John Corry Wilson Daly, the first mayor of Stratford, Ontario, or Charles L. Daly, an art instructor and clerk with the city of Toronto.

An investigation of the provenance of the paintings was spurred by a visit to the Confederation Centre by Daly's great-grandson, Richard Jenkins. His family had paintings done by Daly, and he recognised her signature on the paintings held by the gallery. He alerted them that the paintings may have been misattributed.

Paige Matthie, who curated the exhibit, conducted a two-year review of the attributions and prepared a detailed report outlining her findings. She concluded that Caroline Louise Daly was the artist who produced the water-colours held by the gallery. Matthie discovered through her research that the attributions to the men were not well founded. One of them, John C.W. Daly of Stratford, Ontario was not even known as a painter, while there was no evidence that Charles L. Daly from Toronto had ever visited Prince Edward Island. Matthie also compared the gallery's paintings to known paintings by Daly and found clear stylistic similarities. "As soon as I dug through the files, it was very clear that we had no legs to stand on with our own attributions," Matthie stated. The misattribution, even though likely inadvertent, probably reflects the difficulty in tracking artwork done by women, in what is still a male-dominated area. Matthie comments that in an era of limited opportunities for Victorian women, "It is wonderful that Daly seized opportunities to try new things with her work, painting the interior of her ship's cabin on the voyage to Australia, or copying the work of male artists who were able to go into the wilderness to capture the sublime beauty of Canada."

== Holdings and exhibitions ==
The Confederation Centre Art Gallery acquired its first four Daly paintings in 1969. The paintings showed scenes from Charlottetown in the mid-nineteenth century, which the gallery was always keen to have. The gallery purchased the four paintings from an art collector in Montreal, who said they were by John C.W. Daly of Stratford. The gallery did what Matthie referred to as "some messy attribution research" and concluded that the paintings were by Charles L. Daly of Toronto. When the gallery acquired two more Daly paintings, they were also attributed to Charles L. Daly. The gallery had regularly exhibited the paintings since the acquisition. The paintings of Government House in Charlottetown had also been used to assist in restoration projects. Library and Archives Canada and the Public Archives and Records Office of Prince Edward Island also have some of Daly's paintings.

Following the discovery of the misattribution, and correction by the gallery, the Daly family donated six more of Daly's paintings, doubling the gallery's Daly collection. The gallery then held a new exhibition of Daly's paintings, running from January to May, 2017, entitled "Introducing Caroline Louisa Daly." Matthie said that the title came from the mid-Victorian custom of holding balls to introduce young ladies to society. She commented that the gallery for years had been displaying Daly's works without giving her due credit. "That's a mistake I'm very happy to correct," she stated.
