= John Corry Wilson Daly =

Canadian politician (1796–1878)

Lieutenant-Colonel John Corry Wilson Daly (24 March 1796 – 1 April 1878) was a Canadian politician, businessperson, militia officer, and the first Mayor of Stratford, Ontario.

Daly was born in Liverpool, England, and educated in Ireland. He served as a surgeon's assistant in the Royal Navy. He moved to Stratford in 1833, becoming post-master and opening the town's first store. He is often regarded as Stratford's founder, although he was not the first person to live there.

Until 2017, Daly was mistakenly credited with watercolour work by Caroline Louisa Daly held in Confederation Centre Art Gallery on Prince Edward Island, despite a lack of evidence that he ever painted.
