= Edward Smyth =

Edward Smyth may refer to:

- Sir Edward Smyth, 2nd Baronet (1637–1713), English landowner
- Edward Smyth (sculptor) (1749–1812), Irish sculptor
- Edward Selby Smyth (1819–1896), British general
- Edward Smyth (bishop) (1665–1720), Bishop of Down and Connor

== See also ==
- Edward Smith (disambiguation)
- Edward Smythe (disambiguation)
