= Edward Smythe (disambiguation) =

Edward Smythe (died 1714), was MP for Leicestershire.

Edward Smythe may also refer to:

- Sir Edward Smythe, 4th Baronet (1719–1784), of the Smythe Baronets
- Sir Edward Smythe, 5th Baronet (1758–1811), of the Smythe Baronets
- Sir Edward Smythe, 6th Baronet (1787–1856), of the Smythe Baronets
- Sir Edward Smythe, 9th Baronet (1869–1942), of the Smythe Baronets
- Edward H. Smythe, Canadian politician

== See also ==
- Edward Smyth (disambiguation)
- Edward Smith (disambiguation)
