= Edmund Smith =

Edmund Smith may refer to:

== Politicians ==
- Edmund Edmonds Smith (1847–1914), member of the Victorian Legislative Council for South Yarra
- Edmund Horace Smith (1855–1931), Australian politician, member of the Western Australian Legislative Assembly for Beverley
- Edmund Smith (MP), member of parliament (MP) for Helston

== Other people ==
- Edmund Smith (poet) (1672–1710), English poet
- Edmund Smith (soccer) (1902–1978), Scottish-US soccer forward
- Edmund A. Smith (1870–1909), American inventor
- Edmund Kirby Smith (1824–1893), United States Army officer and educator
- Edmund Munroe Smith (1854–1926), American jurist and historian

== See also ==
- Edmond L. Smith (1829–1891), American politician from Pennsylvania and Colorado
- Edmund Wyldbore-Smith (1877–1938), British civil servant, diplomat, and businessman
- Edmund Hakewill-Smith (1896–1986), South African-born British General
- Ed Smith (disambiguation)
- Edmund Smyth (1858–1950), Anglican bishop
