= Edward Smith (biographer) =

Edward Smith (1839–1919) was an English biographer. A Fellow of the Statistical Society, Smith was awarded its Howard Medal in 1875, for an essay on "The State of the Dwellings of the Poor [...]", then published as The Peasant's Home.

== Works ==
- The Peasant's Home, 1760-1875 (1876)
- William Cobbett: A Biography (1878)
- The Story of the English Jacobins (1881)
- Foreign Visitors in England (1889)
- England and America after Independence (1900)
- The Life of Sir Joseph Banks (1911)

=== Contributions to the DNB ===
- John Almon
- Thomas Amyot
- Edward Baines
- Samuel Bamford
- William Pleydell-Bouverie
- Hugh Boyd (1746-1794)
- Francis Burdett
- Mathew Carey
- John Cartwright (1740-1824)
- William Cobbett
