= Ed Smith (sculptor) =

American sculptor

Ed Smith (born 1956) is an American sculptor and printmaker. Smith is a member of the National Academy of Design, a Guggenheim Fellow in Sculpture and Drawing, and a former Associate Member of the Royal Society of Sculptors. Smith's work is based on mythology.
