= Piper Aerostar =

US twin-engined propeller-driven executive aircraft

Aerostar / Superstar / Sequoya
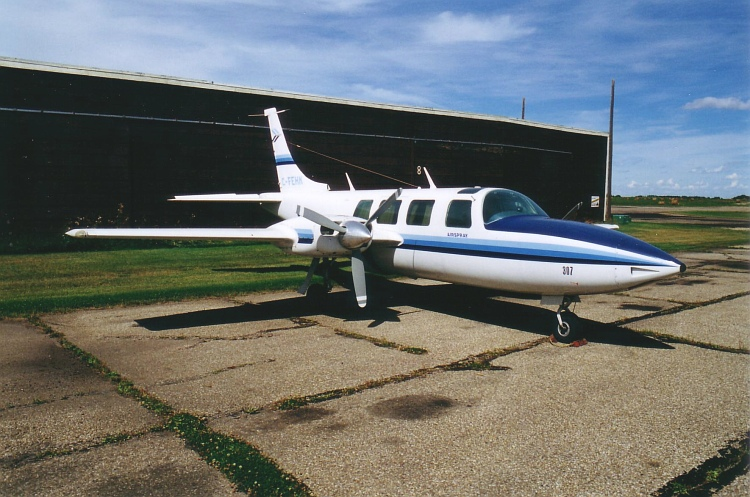
- An Aerostar 600 in Red Deer, Alberta in 2000

General information
- Type: Civil utility aircraft
- National origin: United States
- Manufacturer: Ted Smith Aircraft Company; Piper Aircraft Corporation
- Designer: Ted R. Smith
- Status: Active service
- Number built: 1,010

History
- Manufactured: 1967–1984
- First flight: 1967

The Piper Aerostar (originally the Ted Smith Aerostar) is an American light twin-engined piston aircraft designed by Ted R. Smith. It was originally built by Ted Smith Aircraft Company, but the design was acquired in 1978 by the Piper Aircraft Corporation, which continued production of the aircraft as the PA-60.

== Development ==
After having designed the Aero Commander and Jet Commander, Ted R. Smith founded the Ted Smith Aircraft Company in 1963 to build a new line of aircraft. The first Aerostar prototype, the Model 320, was built with two 160 hp (120 kW) Lycoming IO-320 engines and first flew in November 1966. The same aircraft was upgraded with a pair of 180 hp (130 kW) Lycoming IO-360 engines and a more streamlined vertical fin and renamed the Model 360; it was subsequently upgraded again with 200 hp (150 kW) IO-360s and renamed again as the Model 400. The aircraft finally entered production as the Aerostar 600 with two 290 hp (220 kW) Lycoming IO-540-K engines, first flown in December 1967. Also produced, and the base of most of the subsequent models, was a version with turbocharged engines, the Aerostar 601.

The aircraft were originally built at Van Nuys, California, but in 1968 the company was bought by the American Cement Company. The acquisition was not a success, and in 1969 the company was sold again to Butler Aviation International, a major fixed base operator and owner of Mooney Aircraft Corporation. Butler combined Ted Smith Aircraft and Mooney Aircraft under the Aerostar Aircraft Corporation banner and made plans to consolidate aircraft production at the Mooney plant at Kerrville, Texas, but got into a dispute with American Cement over alleged corrosion problems with the airframe; the U.S. Federal Aviation Administration (FAA) investigated and found that no such problem existed, but the dispute resulted in a two-year production hiatus and cancellation of the plant relocation plan. In 1971, Smith attempted to repurchase the rights and announced he would be building an all-new design that was better than the Aerostar, but negotiations broke down. The Bellanca Aircraft Company and Chance Vought also expressed interest in acquiring the design.

In 1972, Ted Smith bought back all the rights to the aircraft and began manufacturing Aerostars under the Ted R. Smith and Associates banner in Santa Maria, California, in 1973. 1974 saw the introduction of the successful 601P, which introduced cabin pressurization, allowing more convenient high-altitude operation; the designers were able to adapt the fuselage to pressurization without having to limit its service life. The 601P also featured improvements to the turbocharging system to increase engine reliability and ease engine operation; the improved turbo system and a 2.5-foot (0.76 m) greater wingspan improve climb performance. The company also built a single prototype of the more powerful Aerostar 700 Superstar. In 1976, the company name was changed to the Ted Smith Aerostar Corporation. In 1977, the 601B brought the improved turbo system and greater wingspan of the 601P to the non-pressurized 601 line, along with a 300 lb (140 kg) increase in maximum takeoff weight.

Smith died suddenly in 1976. In 1978, the Aerostar line was acquired by the Piper Aircraft Corporation, which continued to build two variants, the 600A and 601B, and re-introduced the 601P. Piper continued using the basic Ted Smith model designation system but prefixed each model as the PA-60. Piper introduced the enhanced 602P, which was initially marketed as the Sequoya, (Note: Simpson says the Sequoya is the 601P on page 326 but says it's the 602P on Page 327. 602P is more consistent with the previous model history.) and also put the 700 Superstar into production as the 700P. The 602P was the first model with a turbocharger system built and certified by the engine manufacturer, rather than a turbo system designed and installed by Ted Smith or Piper. After discontinuing production of the non-pressurized models, Piper moved production to Vero Beach, Florida, building the last Aerostar there in 1984.

Smith conducted engineering studies for a jet-powered Aerostar, and also envisioned turboprop power and a single-engine trainer aircraft using the same basic airframe, but these plans never came to fruition during the aircraft's production run.

== Design ==
The Aerostar emerged as a mid-wing cantilever monoplane powered by two wing-mounted piston engines, with retractable landing gear in a tricycle configuration. It is designed to seat six, and is distinguished from light twins of similar size and weight by its high wing loading, careful attention to fine aerodynamic details, a mid wing, and in early models, the absence of cowl flaps; Smith was adamant that they were not needed because of the refined cooling system design. Despite this, the later 700P used cowl flaps because engine cooling of earlier models proved marginal if the system is not maintained rigorously.

The engines of early 601s are turbonormalized—they retain the higher compression ratio typical of a non-turbocharged engine, and the turbo system is designed primarily to compensate for increasing altitude by providing more boost pressure as the outside air pressure declines. Later models featured a redesigned turbo system intended to increase reliability and be more forgiving of improper operation by the pilot. Unusual Aerostar design features include electrically operated remote fuel valves, which avert the need to run fuel lines into the cockpit; electro-hydraulic nosewheel steering; a flight control system that relies on push-pull rods and torque tubes rather than cables; and unusually thick and stiff wing skins, which—together with the high wing loading—give the Aerostar an unusually smooth ride in turbulence.

Some disadvantages of the aircraft compared to its competitors are the absence of a nose baggage locker, and a cabin that can only be accessed through a single clamshell door next to the pilot's seat; aircraft occupants other than the pilot in command must climb over the folded pilot's seat to access their seats.

Aerostar model numbers nominally refer to the total installed engine horsepower, but some model numbers vary from the precise total, particularly the later models.

== Operational history ==
During the time of production, the Aerostar held the speed record for fastest twin piston general aviation aircraft, capable of cruise speeds from 220 knots (410 km/h; 250 mph) for the earliest 600 models to 261 knots (483 km/h; 300 mph) for the later 700 models. Light construction, low drag, and powerful engines contribute to fast climb rates, while allowing high operating altitudes and class-leading fuel efficiency.

A study of Aerostar accidents by The Aviation Consumer from 1978 to 1982 showed that the Aerostar had an accident rate of 12.9 per 100,000 flight hours, substantially more than the rate of the comparable Beechcraft Baron 58 at 4.9 per 100,000 hours. A similar study conducted by Aviation Safety compared the safety records of eight similar models of twin-piston-engine aircraft and found that the Aerostar had the highest accident and fatal accident rate. According to the studies, the leading cause of Aerostar accidents was engine failures on takeoff. The Aviation Consumer notes that the Aerostar's high wing loading, which contributes to its high cruise speed, also gives it relatively unforgiving flying qualities on takeoff and landing; the aircraft requires relatively long runways, and pilots must keep the airspeed high during approach to avoid falling behind the power curve, which can cause an excessive sink rate. The wing flaps of the Aerostar slow the aircraft relatively quickly, which may induce this problem, so pilots are advised not to use the full 20-degree flap setting until the aircraft is close enough to the runway to ensure a safe landing.

The Aerostar has a history of accidents stemming from fuel mismanagement by the pilot. Most later Aerostars have a 41.5-US-gallon (157 L; 34.6 imp gal) fuselage fuel tank and individual 62-US-gallon (230 L; 52 imp gal) fuel tanks in each wing, which all feed into a common chamber near the fuselage tank; the common chamber in turn normally feeds the engines. However, the relative lack of wing dihedral may cause the wing tanks to feed unevenly when used in this manner, causing a fuel imbalance as flight progresses. This problem can be mitigated by using the fuel valves to crossfeed fuel from one wing tank to the opposite engine, bypassing the common chamber; however, the wing tanks are prone to unporting when they are mostly empty, causing engines to lose power or stop running. This hazard can be exacerbated if electrical power is lost, as the electrically operated fuel valves will become inoperable, preventing the pilot from switching back to the fuselage tank. To mitigate these problems, a 1984 airworthiness directive (AD) required owners to install individual, more accurate fuel gauges for each wing tank, a dedicated low-fuel warning light, and placards explaining correct crossfeed procedures.

The Aerostar has a history of problems with the clamshell-style entry door, which is located directly in front of the left-hand propeller, making it critical for the door to be secured before takeoff. A number of accidents have resulted from the upper half of the door coming open in flight and in some cases separating from the aircraft. Although it was not conclusively listed as causal, an unsecured upper door is widely thought to have contributed to a 1988 crash that killed the auto racing driver Al Holbert, who was piloting the aircraft. That year, the FAA issued an AD requiring inspection of the door rigging, a placard explaining proper door operation, and a dedicated door-ajar warning light. In addition, the FAA has issued warnings regarding an aftermarket door strut which required an installation procedure that may damage a door gusset; the gusset may break in flight and cause the door seal to fail, potentially causing uncontrolled decompression in pressurized versions of the Aerostar.

Although nominally a six-seat aircraft, owners often remove center-row seats because most Aerostars have inadequate payload to simultaneously carry six people, their baggage, and a large fuel load, and removing the seats improves access and legroom in the third-row seats, which are quieter than the other seating positions and are therefore preferred by many passengers.

The Aerostar has a reputation for high maintenance requirements and servicing costs due to a cooling system design that is intolerant of poor maintenance, a lack of working space around various aircraft systems, and a turbo system that is sensitive to exhaust system problems.

The Aerostar type certificate and manufacturing documentation were sold in 1991 to Jim Christy and Steve Speer, former Ted Smith Aerostar employees who operate Aerostar Aircraft Corporation (originally Machen Incorporated), providing maintenance and support for the aircraft and continued research and development. In 2006, Speer restarted design studies for a jet-powered Aerostar, and in 2010, Aerostar Aircraft first flew the Aerostar Jet, a 601P refitted with a pair of wing-mounted 1,460 lbf (6.5 kN) Pratt & Whitney CW615F engines, providing an estimated maximum cruise speed of 355 knots (657 km/h; 409 mph). In 2014, Aerostar Aircraft said it was investigating production of the aircraft.

== Variants ==
Model 320
First prototype, powered by two 160 hp (120 kW) Lycoming IO-320 engines
Model 360
Modification of first prototype with two 180 hp (130 kW) Lycoming IO-360 engines and a redesigned empennage
Model 400
Modification of first prototype with two 200 hp (150 kW) IO-360 engines; type certified, but did not enter production
Model 500/500P
Projected versions with 250 hp (190 kW) fuel injected engines, to be non-pressurized and pressurized respectively; none built
600 (PA-60-600)
Initial production model with two 290 hp (220 kW) Lycoming IO-540-K engines, 282 produced under four different company names
600A (PA-60-600A)
Model 600 with some minor detail changes and improved engines, 206 built
600E
Designation used for aircraft sold in Europe
601 (PA-60-601)
This aircraft still holds the land closed speed record for a production piston twin
Model 600 with 290 hp turbocharged Lycoming TIO-540 engines, 117 built
601B (PA-60-601B)
Model 601 with increased gross weight, increased wingspan and improved turbo system, 44 built
601P (PA-60-601P)
Pressurized version of 601 with increased gross weight, increased wingspan and improved turbo system from 601B, 492 built
602P Sequoya (PA-60-602P)
Piper-developed version of 601P with 290 hp Lycoming TIO-540-AA1A5 engines, 124 built
620
The prototype pressurized Aerostar with 310 hp (230 kW) TIO-540 engines, one built (at Van Nuys in mid-1969)
700 Superstar
Prototype of stretched fuselage variant with two IO-540M engines, one built
700P (PA-60-700P)
602P with counter-rotating 350 hp (260 kW) Lycoming TIO-540-U2A engines, 26 built
702P
New modification of 700P with a reinforced nose gear allowing for higher takeoff weight
800
601P with stretched fuselage, enlarged tail and two 400 hp (300 kW) Lycoming engines, one built
Super 700
Machen/Aerostar Aircraft conversion of 601P or 602P with three-bladed Hartzell propellers, 350 hp (260 kW) Lycoming TIO-540-U2A engines, and increased gross weight
Speedstar 850
A modification to replace the twin piston engines with a single nose mounted turboprop
Aerostar Jet
601P with two 1,460 lbf (6.5 kN) Pratt & Whitney CW615F engines; one converted

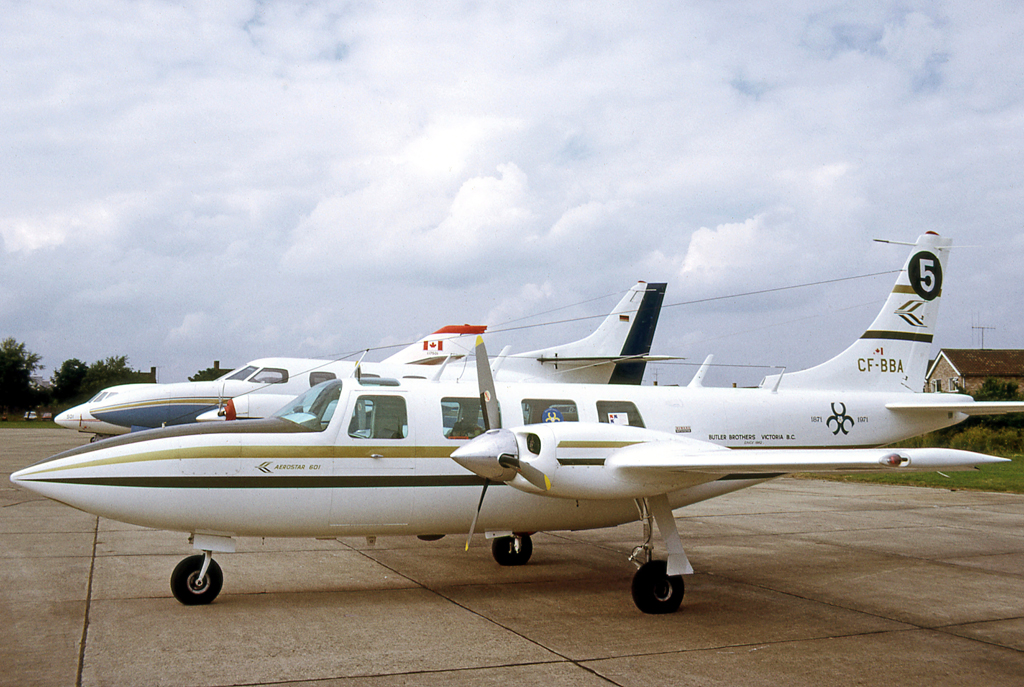
Ted Smith-built Aerostar 601 in 1971

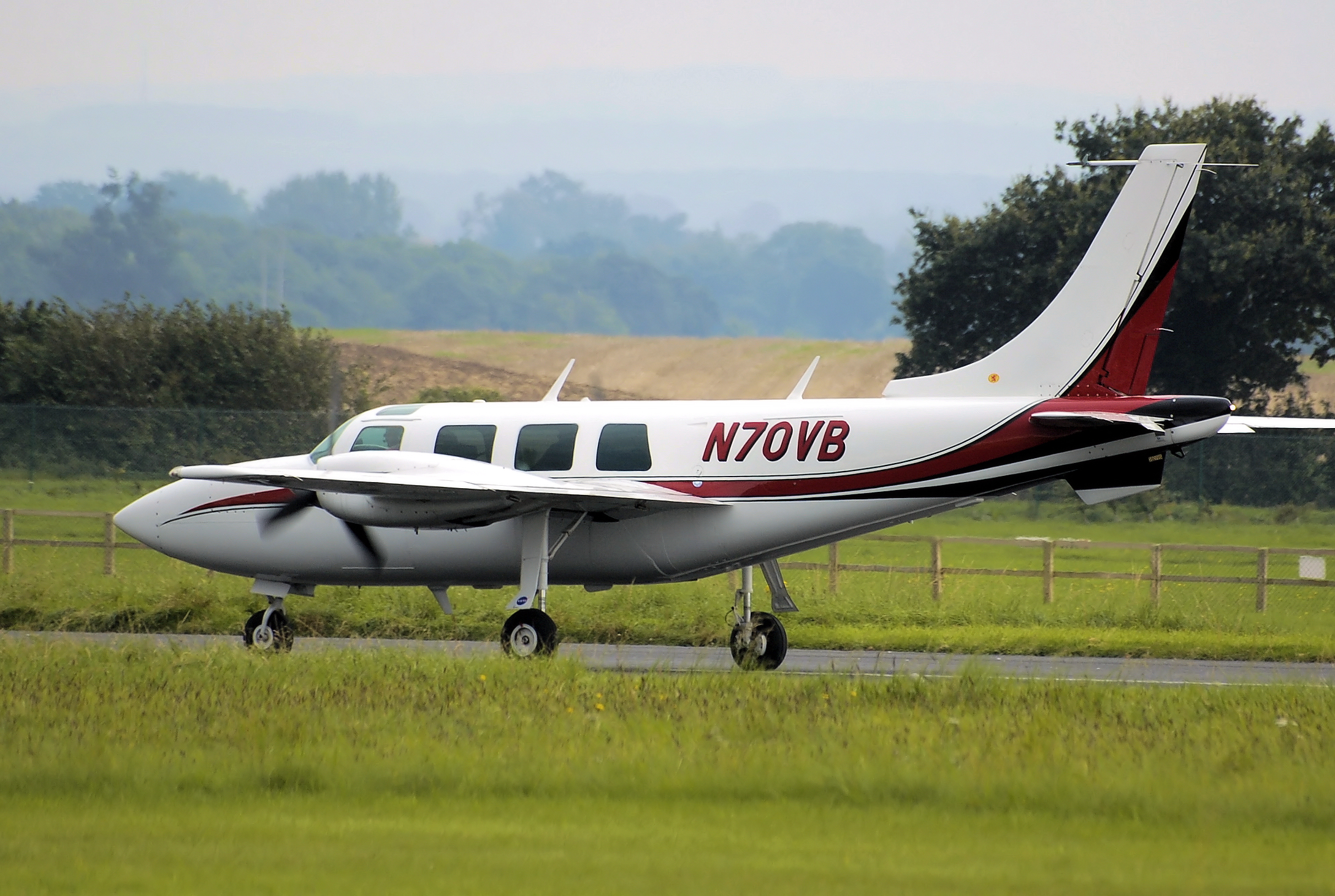
Piper PA-60-600 Aerostar, built in 1977

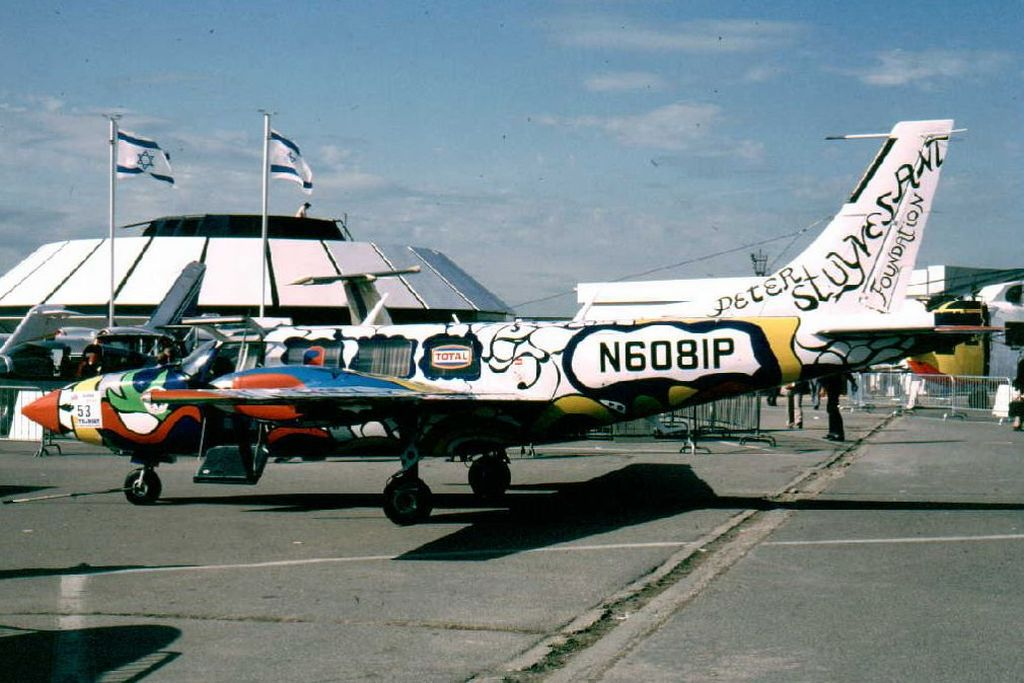
A Piper Sequoia 602P at Paris Air Show Le Bourget in 1981

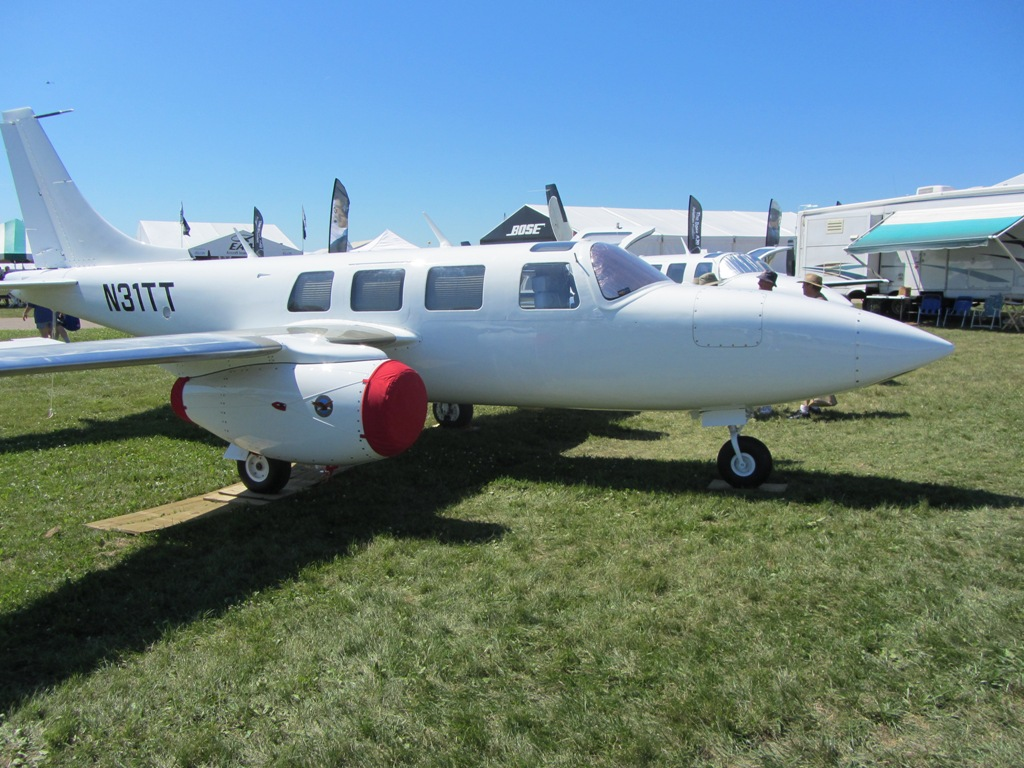
An experimental turbine powered Aerostar FJ-80 in 2011

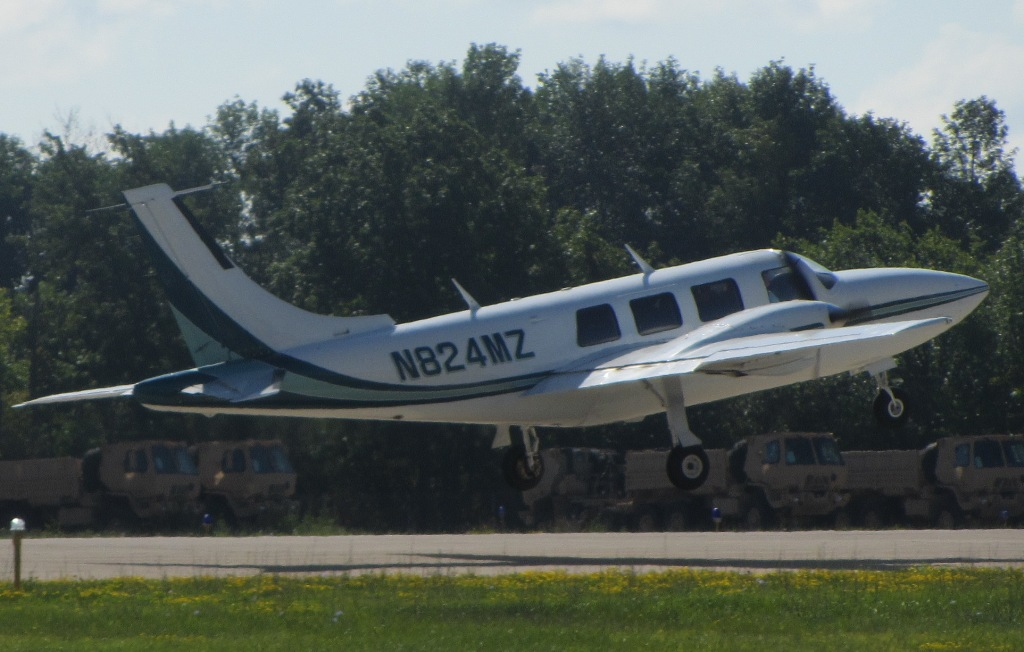
1980 Aerostar 601P

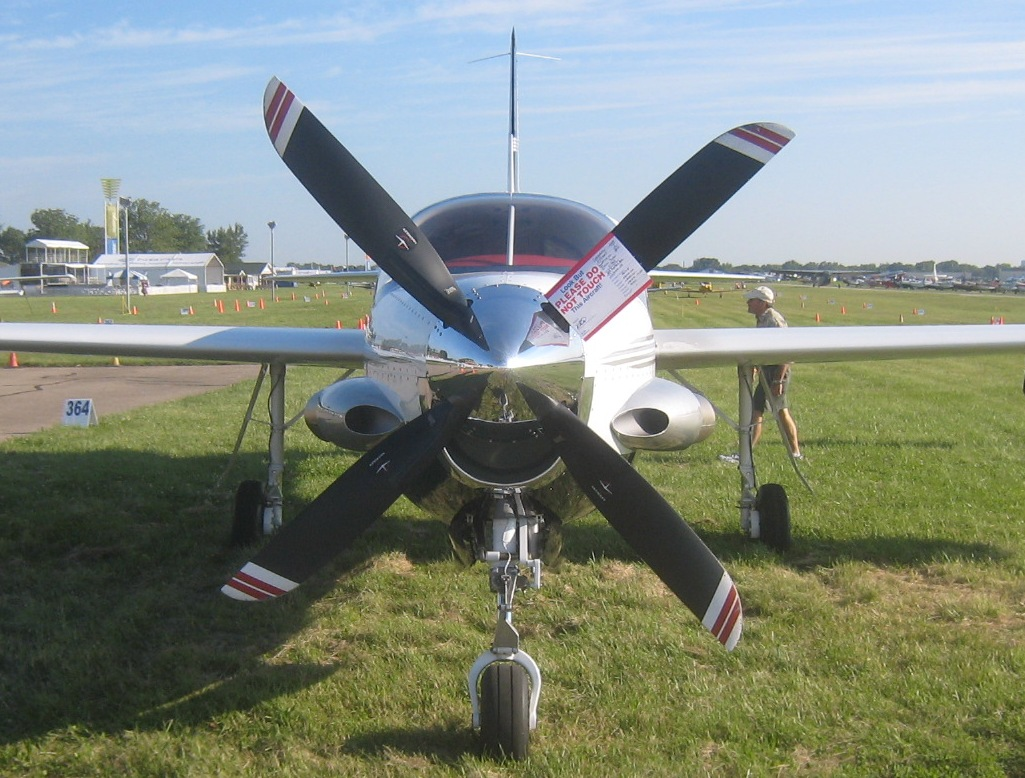
Speedstar 850

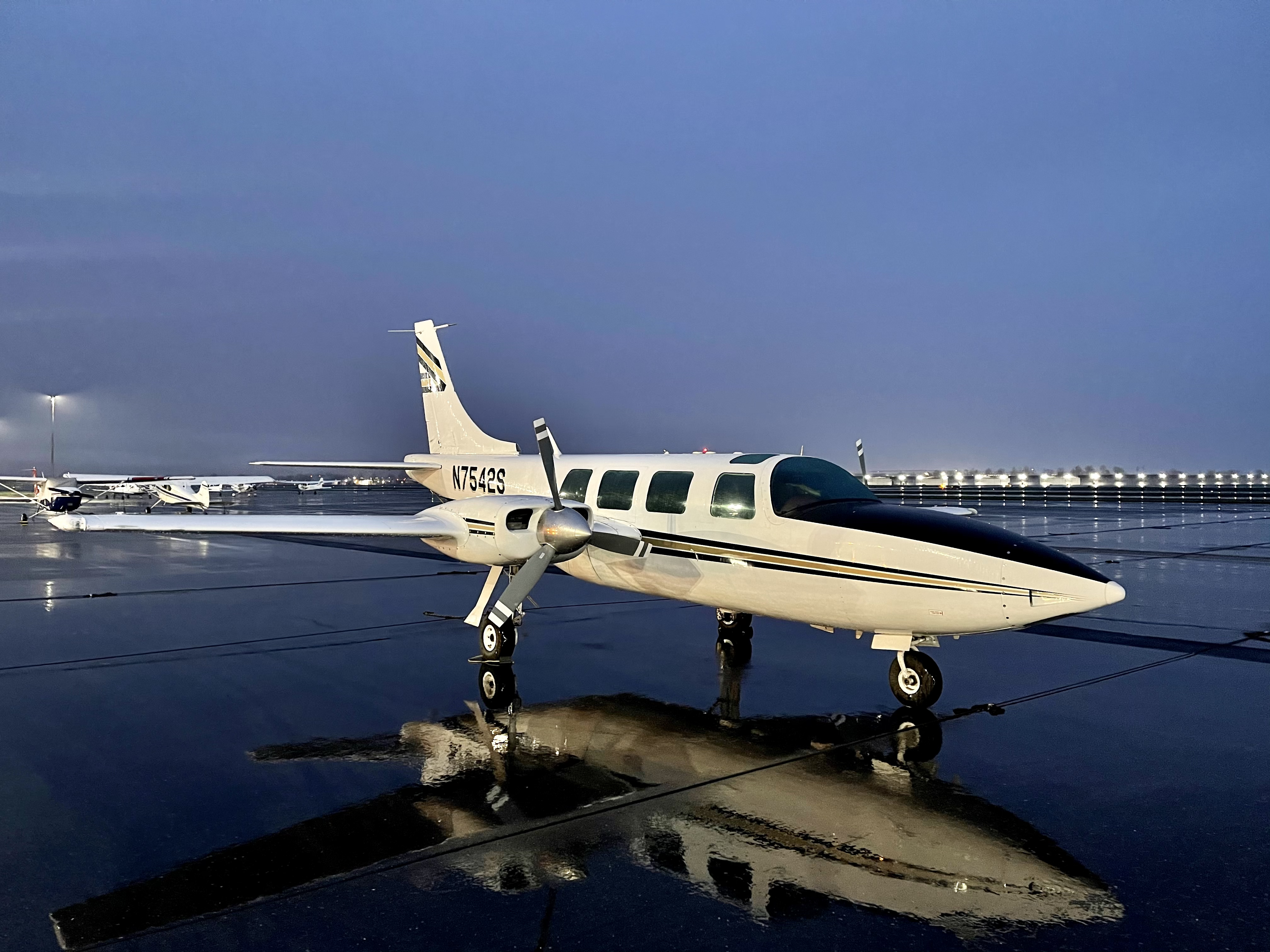
Aerostar 600

== Accidents and incidents ==
- On September 30, 1988, Al Holbert, auto racing driver and winner of the informal Triple Crown of endurance racing, was killed when the Piper PA-60-601P he was piloting, aircraft registration N14HR, crashed after takeoff from Ohio State University Airport. Eyewitnesses said the aircraft seemed to struggle to gain altitude, and then crashed during an apparent turn back to the airport, catching fire on impact. The National Transportation Safety Board (NTSB) attributed the crash to a pilot-induced stall. The accident report noted that the upper half of the cabin door was found open; it is speculated that the door opened on takeoff and Holbert was trying to close it when he lost control of the aircraft.
- On April 4, 1991, in the Merion mid-air collision, Piper PA-60-601 N3645D collided with a Bell 412SP helicopter, N78S, over Lower Merion Township, Pennsylvania, during a visual inspection of the Piper's nose landing gear. The collision killed all four pilots in both aircraft along with John Heinz, United States Senator for Pennsylvania, who was the sole passenger in the Piper. Wreckage fell on an elementary school and nearby houses, killing two schoolchildren, severely burning a third, and causing minor injuries to four other bystanders. The NTSB attributed the accident to poor judgment and decision-making by the pilots of both aircraft. A contributing factor was a lack of direction in the PA-60 flight manual regarding procedures if the cockpit indicator light did not show that the nosegear was down and locked; landing with improperly deployed gear would have been safer than the improvised aerial inspection, the NTSB said.
- On January 4, 1995, Piper PA-60-601P N720EM, piloted by Eduardo Mata, former conductor of the Dallas Symphony Orchestra, crashed into a ravine and exploded after an engine failure during climbout from Cuernavaca Airport, killing Mata and his single passenger. Investigators were unable to determine the cause of the engine failure.
- On January 27, 2020, a twin-engine Piper Aerostar aircraft crashed outside Abraham Lincoln Capital Airport after takeoff en route for Huntsville, Alabama. Officials reported at the time that the aircraft was having trouble with its instruments. Former Springfield mayor Frank Edwards and then-current Sangamon County Coroner Cinda Edwards were among those killed in the crash.

== Specifications (700P) ==
Data from Jane's Civil and Military Aircraft Upgrades 1994–95

General characteristics

- Crew: 1
- Capacity: 5 passengers
- Length: 34 ft 9.75 in (10.61 m)
- Wingspan: 36 ft 8 in (11.18 m)
- Height: 12 ft 1 in (3.68 m)
- Wing area: 178.2 sq ft (16.56 m^{2})
- Empty weight: 4,275 lb (1,939 kg)
- Gross weight: 6,315 lb (2,864 kg)
- Powerplant: 2 × Avco Lycoming TIO-540-U2A flat six counter-rotating piston , 350 hp (261 kW) each

Performance

- Maximum speed: 306 mph (492 km/h, 266 kn)
- Cruise speed: 242 mph (390 km/h, 210 kn)
- Range: 1,024 mi (1,648 km, 890 nmi)
- Service ceiling: 25,000 ft (7,620 m)
- Rate of climb: 1,840 ft/min (9.4 m/s)

== See also ==
Aircraft of comparable role, configuration, and era

- Aero Commander 500 family
- Beechcraft Baron
- Beechcraft Travel Air
- Cessna 310
- Let L-200 Morava
- Partenavia P.68
- Piper PA-23
- Piper PA-34 Seneca
