= Commercial Motor =

British road transport magazine

- Commercial Motor cover, 1 October 2026
- Editor: Will Shiers
- Categories: Road transport
- Frequency: Weekly
- Circulation: 10,727 (2011)
- Founded: 1905
- Company: MA Business
- Country: United Kingdom
- Language: British English
- Website: Commercialmotor.com
- ISSN: 0010-3063

Commercial Motor is a weekly magazine serving the road transport industry in the United Kingdom. Founded in 1905 by Edmund Dangerfield, it is notable for having been "the first journal to be devoted exclusively to the commercial vehicle engaged in the conveyance of goods or in passenger carrying".

Originally named The Commercial Motor, the title was shortened to Commercial Motor for the first issue of 1966. The publication is commonly referred to as 'CM' by its readers and editorial staff.

Commercial Motor was initially published by Temple Press and currently published by MA Business, part of Mark Allen Group since 2026.

== Launch ==
The Commercial Motor was launched in March 1905 by Temple Press. In the leader of the first issue it described itself as a "missionary and educative medium".

For the first issue on 16 March, 20,000 copies were issued "in Britain and other countries, with the hope that the normal weekly circulation would be at least 5,000".

== Composition ==
The content of Commercial Motor consists of editorial followed by classified advertising. The editorial part of the publication is subdivided into:

- 'This Week': news section, including letters
- 'Legal Digest': case reports, O-licence applications and decisions, upcoming training courses
- 'Operations': features section, usually including a van or truck road test
- 'Used Trucks': news and features for used truck buyers and sellers

== Online ==
Commercial Motor's website launched at the end of November 2011. Reflecting the print publication, it is a mixture of editorial content and classified advertising.

== Events ==
Commercial Motor is an official media partner of the Commercial Vehicle Show.

In October 2012 a new event under the Commercial Motor brand called Commercial Motor Live was launched. Exhibitors at this event included truck manufacturers such as Mercedes-Benz and service suppliers to the road transport industry including Backhouse Jones. The event was held again in 2013.
