= Ted Smith (Canadian painter) =

Landscape painter from Kamloops, Canada

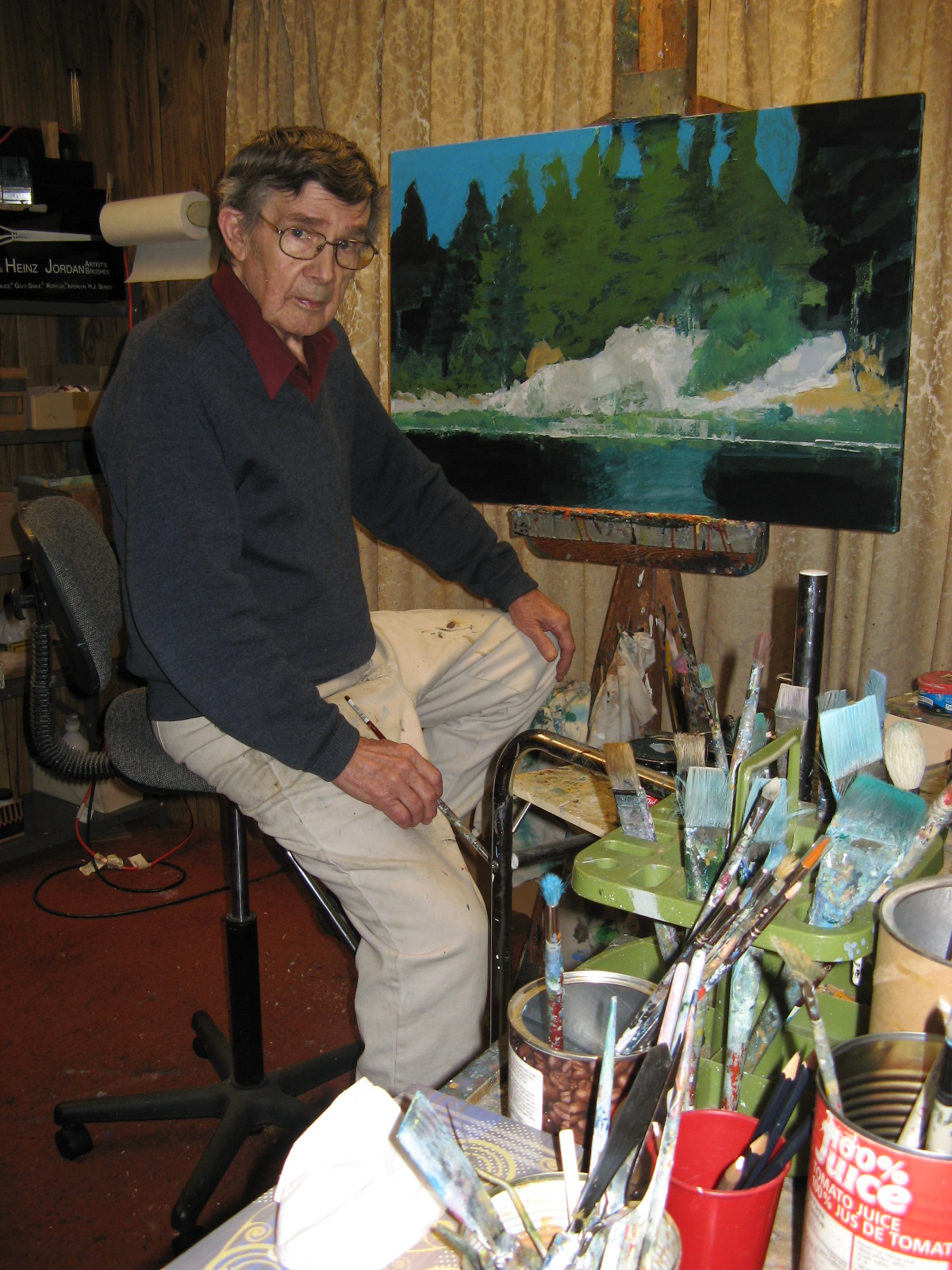
Ted Smith with a painting in progress, 2012.

James Edward "Ted" Smith (1933–2016) was a painter from Kamloops, B.C., Canada. He was known for his abstract landscape paintings of the region.

== Early life and education ==
Smith was born in Vernon, B.C. to Alma Louisa Smith (née Johnson) and James Alexander Smith. He grew up in Lumby, Barriere, and then Kamloops, B.C. After graduating high school, Smith worked for several years for Canadian National Railway. He also attended Victoria College from 1952 to 1953 and the University of British Columbia from 1954 to 1955.

In 1960, Smith enrolled at the Vancouver School of Art. He decided to begin art school on the advice of William Geddes, an industrial psychologist at Victoria College. During his time at VSA, he studied sculpture, design, drawing, and painting with teachers including Orville Fischer, Jack Shadbolt, Donald Jarvis, Roy Kiyooka, Peter Aspell, Fred Amess, and Reg Holmes. He graduated with a diploma in painting in 1964.

== Career ==
After art school, Smith moved back to Kamloops, where he lived and painted from his mobile home until his death in 2016. He was represented by the Oasis Gallery in Kamloops, the Bridge Street Gallery in Vancouver, and the Art Ark gallery in Kelowna. After the Art Ark closed, Ted's work was promoted locally by the Kamloops community.

His work was featured many times at the Kamloops Art Gallery in both solo and group exhibits. His works have been exhibited alongside those of A.Y. Jackson, Ann Kipling, Toni Onley, and Jack Shadbolt, among others. His paintings were known for the use of colours and shapes, and for their association with lyrical abstraction and modernism. He cites Shadbolt, Jarvis, and Nicolas de Staël as influences on his style. As a regular fishing companion of Kamloops fly fisherman Jack Shaw, Smith spent much time on the lakes around Kamloops. He painted from both field sketches and photographs, and described his process as “trying to capture what [he] saw.”

== Exhibitions ==
- 1980 – Ted Smith and Rhona Armes, Kamloops Art Gallery
- 1982 – Images of a Regional Landscape, Kamloops Art Gallery
- 1983 – University College of the Cariboo (Kamloops, B.C.)
- 1988 – In Celebration, Kamloops Art Gallery
- 1988 and 1994- Oasis Gallery (Kamloops, B.C.)
- 1989 and 1991 – The Little Picture Show, Oasis Gallery (Kamloops, B.C.)
- 1992 – Ted Smith: Three Decades of Colour, Kamloops Art Gallery
- 1995 – Juried Exhibition, Kamloops Art Gallery
- 2000-2001 – Home Grown: Five from the Region, Kamloops Art Gallery
- 2011 – Familiar Territory, Kamloops Art Gallery
- 2014 – Ted Smith: A Retrospective, Kamloops Art Gallery
- 2019 – Ted Smith: Ideal Forms, Kamloops Museum and Archives (posthumous)
- 2022 – Reading the Land: Ten Years of Collecting, Kamloops Art Gallery (posthumous)
