= Edmund Dangerfield =

English printer and publisher (1864–1938)

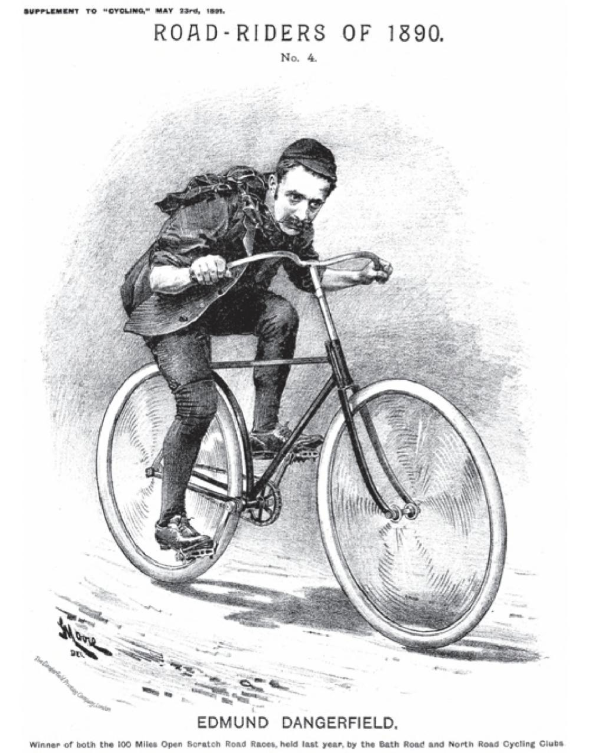
Drawing of Edmund Dangerfield Winner of the 100 Miles Open Scratch Road Races held in 1890 by the Bath Road and North Road Cycling Clubs by George Moore

Edmund Dangerfield (15 April 1864 – 1938) was an English printer and magazine publisher who specialised in cycling and motor transport. These included Cycling launched in 1891, Commercial Motor launched in 1905.

Edmund was the son of Frederick Dangerfield and Emiline Bruce Walker. His father owned a print works and Edmund started work there as a wages clerk.

Edmund was a keen cyclist, becoming a member of the Bath Road Club.
