= Edwin Smith (metallurgist) =

Metallurgist

- Scientific career
- Fields: metallurgy

Edwin 'Ted' Smith FRS (28 July 1931 — 4 July 2010) was a metallurgy scientist whose career included roles in both industry and academia. His first metallurgy role was as a postgraduate student in the Department of Metallurgy at Sheffield University. His early industry career work included roles at the Associated Electrical Industries (AEI) Research Laboratory, Aldermaston, and at the Central Electricity Generating Board Research Laboratories in Leatherhead. Smith became Professor of Metallurgy at the University of Manchester in 1968, and was involved in the process of joining his department with the University of Manchester Institute of Science and Technology's (UMIST) own Department of Metallurgy in 1975. Smith was appointed Dean of the Faculty of Science at the University of Manchester from 1983–1985, and then Pro-Vice Chancellor of the University from 1985–1988. He was elected Fellow of the Royal Society in 1996.
