= Edward Smith (cricketer, born 1868) =

English cricketer, physician and soldier

Personal information
- Full name: Edward Pelham Smith
- Born: 17 November 1878; British India
- Died: 17 March 1937 (aged 58); Watton-at-Stone, Hertfordshire, England
- Batting: Unknown

Domestic team information
- Years: Team
- 1903/04: Europeans

Career statistics
| Competition | First-class |
|---|---|
| Matches | 1 |
| Runs scored | 26 |
| Batting average | 13.00 |
| 100s/50s | –/– |
| Top score | 14 |
| Catches/stumpings | 1/– |
- Source: ESPNcricinfo, 18 November 2023

Edward Pelham Smith (17 November 1868 – 17 March 1937) was an English first-class cricketer and British Army officer.

The son of the politician Abel Smith and Lady Susan Smith, he was born in British India in November 1868. He attended the Royal Military Academy at Woolwich and graduated from there into the Royal Artillery (RA) as a second lieutenant in February 1888. Promotion to lieutenant followed in February 1891, with promotion to captain following in September 1898. Whilst serving in India, Smith made a single appearance in first-class cricket for the Europeans cricket team against the Parsees at Poona in the 1903–04 Bombay Presidency Match. Batting twice in the match, he was dismissed for 14 runs in the Europeans first innings by K. S. Kapadia, while in their second innings he was dismissed for 12 runs by Maneksha Bulsara. In the RA, he was promoted to major in June 1904, prior to his retirement in October 1909. He married Dorothy Mansel-Pleydell in April 1910. Smith died in March 1937 at Watton-at-Stone, Hertfordshire.
