= Edwin Smith (cricketer, born 1860) =

English cricketer

Personal information
- Full name: Edwin Smith
- Born: 11 June 1860; Peatling Magna, Leicestershire, England
- Died: 30 May 1939 (aged 78); Ashby Magna, Leicestershire, England
- Batting: Right-handed
- Bowling: Right-arm fast-medium

Domestic team information
- Years: Team
- 1895: Cheshire

Career statistics
Competition	First-class
Matches	9
Runs scored	118
Batting average	8.42
100s/50s	–/–
Top score	32
Balls bowled	1,293
Wickets	25
Bowling average	19.48
5 wickets in innings	1
10 wickets in match	1
Best bowling	7/59
Catches/stumpings	5/–
- Source: Cricinfo, 12 October 2015

Edwin Smith (11 June 1860 – 30 May 1939) was an English cricketer active in first-class cricket from 1886–1894, making nine appearances as a right-handed batsman and right-arm fast-medium bowler.

Smith made his debut in first-class cricket when he was selected to play for the Liverpool and District cricket team in 1886 against the touring Australians at Aigburth. He made eight further appearances in first-class cricket for Liverpool and District, with his final appearance coming against Cambridge University in 1894. He scored a total of 118 runs in his nine matches, averaged 8.42, with a high score of 32. With the ball he took 25 wickets, which came at a bowling average of 19.48, with one five wicket haul which resulted in his best figures of 7/59, which came against Yorkshire in 1891. Eight of his ten wickets in this match were England Test cricketers. He later made six appearances for Cheshire in the 1895 Minor Counties Championship.

He died at Ashby Magna, Leicestershire on 30 May 1939.
