= Edward Smith (cricketer, born 1831) =

English cricketer

Personal information
- Full name: Edward Smith
- Born: 1 June 1831; London, England
- Died: 16 June 1899 (aged 68); Pewsey, Wiltshire, England
- Batting: Unknown

Domestic team information
- Years: Team
- 1858: Surrey

Career statistics
Competition	First-class
Matches	2
Runs scored	20
Batting average	10.00
100s/50s	–/–
Top score	9*
Balls bowled	–
Wickets	–
Bowling average	–
5 wickets in innings	–
10 wickets in match	–
Best bowling	–
Catches/stumpings	1/–
- Source: Cricinfo, 9 April 2013

Edward Smith (1 June 1831 – 16 June 1899) was an English cricketer. Smith's batting style is unknown. He was born in London.

Smith made his first-class debut for Surrey against Cambridgeshire in 1858 at The Oval. He made a second first-class appearance for the Surrey Club against the Marylebone Cricket Club at Lord's in 1859. He scored a total of 20 runs in his two matches, with a high score of 9 not out.

He died at Pewsey, Wiltshire on 16 June 1899.
