= Ted Smith (footballer, born 1902) =

English footballer (1902–1972)

Personal information
- Full name: Edward Smith
- Date of birth: 22 February 1902
- Place of birth: Sunderland, England
- Date of death: 1972 (aged 69–70)
- Position: Full-back

Senior career*
Years	Team	Apps	(Gls)
1922–1923	Robert Thompson's		
1923–1925	Hartlepools United	56	(0)
1925–1927	Newport County	53	(2)
1927–1928	Portsmouth	12	(0)
1928–1929	Reading	26	(0)
1929–1931	Luton Town	32	(0)
1931	Preston North End	0	(0)
1931–1932	Bristol Rovers	8	(0)
1932	Vauxhall Motors (Luton)		
Total		187	(2)
- * Club domestic league appearances and goals

Edward Smith (22 February 1902 – 1972) was an English footballer who played in the Football League for Bristol Rovers, Hartlepools United, Luton Town, Newport County, Portsmouth and Reading.
