= Edgar Lawrence Smith =

American economist (1882–1971)

Edgar Lawrence Smith (May 6, 1882 – June 19, 1971) was an economist, investment manager and author of the influential 1924 book Common Stocks as Long Term Investments, which promoted the then-surprising idea that stocks excel bonds in long-term yield.

Smith was born and raised in Cambridge, Massachusetts, graduated from Cambridge Latin School (now Cambridge Rindge and Latin School) and received an A.B. from Harvard University in 1905. He worked in banking and other financial endeavors in the years after college, then signed on in 1922 as an adviser to the brokerage firm Low, Dixon & Company. While there, he later recounted in his Harvard class's 50th reunion yearbook, "I tried to write a pamphlet on why bonds were the best form of long term investment. But supporting evidence for this thesis could not be found."

This discovery led to the 1924 publication of "Common Stocks as Long Term Investments." The book was widely reviewed and praised, and became a key intellectual support for the 1920s stock market boom. Its success enabled Smith to launch a mutual fund firm, Investment Managers Company. It also garnered him an invitation from the economist John Maynard Keynes, who had favorably reviewed the book in The Nation and Atheneum, to join the Royal Economic Society.

The Wall Street crash of 1929 brought a turn in Smith's fortunes. Investment Managers was sold to a subsidiary of Irving Trust Company, and in 1931 Smith resigned as its president. After that he devoted his time to research, writing, and painting. Subsequent studies of the relative long-term performance of stocks vs. bonds, by Alfred Cowles in 1939 and Roger G. Ibbotson and Rex Sinquefield in 1976, backed up Smith's 1924 conclusions.

In retirement Smith lived with his wife, Mary née Zender, in Drexel Hill, Pennsylvania. He died in a nursing home in Media, Pennsylvania. Upon his death he was survived by his widow, a son, three daughters, seven grandchildren, and a great-grandchild.

== Quotes ==
As The New York Times put it, the book "has laid down a principle which so reverses the accepted estimate of the relative investment value of bonds and common stocks as to have aroused the keen interest of Wall Street and investment bankers in general." In Smith's own summary for the New York Times, he wrote

I have been unable to find any twenty-year period within which diversification of common stocks has not, in the end, shown better results, both as to income return and safety of principal, than a similar investment in bonds. It was a surprise to me, for my studies were undertaken with the intention of proving the probably future advantage to be gained from bonds over stocks.

Smith said that the "bond tradition" was supported "up to 1897, when the purchasing power of the dollar reached its highest point," but failed to take into account the fact that the dollar "is a fluctuating measure of value."

== Books ==
- Common Stocks As Long Term Investments, originally published 1924, reprinted (2003) by Kessinger Publishing, ISBN 0-7661-6073-4
- Tides in the Affairs of Men. An Approach to the Appraisal of Economic Change, originally published 1940, reprinted (1989) by Fraser Publishing, ISBN 0-87034-090-5 (In this book, he sought to establish a connection between economic booms/busts and changes in the weather.)
- Common Stocks and Business Cycles, by The William-Frederick Press
