= Edwin Smith (cricketer, born 1848) =

English cricketer

Personal information
- Full name: Edwin George Smith
- Born: 29 August 1848; Cheltenham, Gloucestershire, England
- Died: 5 April 1880 (aged 31); Cheltenham, Gloucestershire, England
- Batting: Right-handed
- Bowling: Right-arm medium

Domestic team information
- Years: Team
- 1875–1876: Gloucestershire

Career statistics
Competition	First-class
Matches	2
Runs scored	26
Batting average	8.66
100s/50s	–/–
Top score	14
Balls bowled	–
Wickets	–
Bowling average	–
5 wickets in innings	–
10 wickets in match	–
Best bowling	–
Catches/stumpings	–/–
- Source: Cricinfo, 9 November 2011

Edwin George Smith (29 August 1848 – 5 April 1880) was an English cricketer. Smith was a right-handed batsman who bowled right-arm medium pace. He was born at Cheltenham, Gloucestershire.

Smith made his first-class debut for Gloucestershire against Nottinghamshire in 1875. In this match, he scored 12 runs in Gloucestershire's first-innings, before being dismissed by William Clarke, with the match ending in a draw. The following season he made his second and final first-class appearance for the county, against Yorkshire. In this match, he scored 14 runs in Gloucestershire's first-innings, before being dismissed by Tom Armitage, while in their second-innings he was dismissed for a duck by Robert Clayton.

He died at the town of his birth on 5 April 1880.
