= Ted Smith (footballer, born 1880) =

English footballer

Personal information
- Full name: Edward Smith
- Date of birth: 1880
- Place of birth: Old Hill, England
- Date of death: 1954 (aged 73–74)
- Position: Inside forward

Senior career*
Years	Team	Apps	(Gls)
1899–1900	Old Hill Wanderers		
1900–1901	West Bromwich Albion	0	(0)
1901–1902	Brierley Hill Alliance		
1902–1904	West Bromwich Albion	10	(4)
1904	Brierley Hill Alliance		
Total		12	(1)
- * Club domestic league appearances and goals

Edward Smith (1880–1954) was an English footballer who played in the Football League for West Bromwich Albion.
