= Thomas Amyot =

English antiquarian

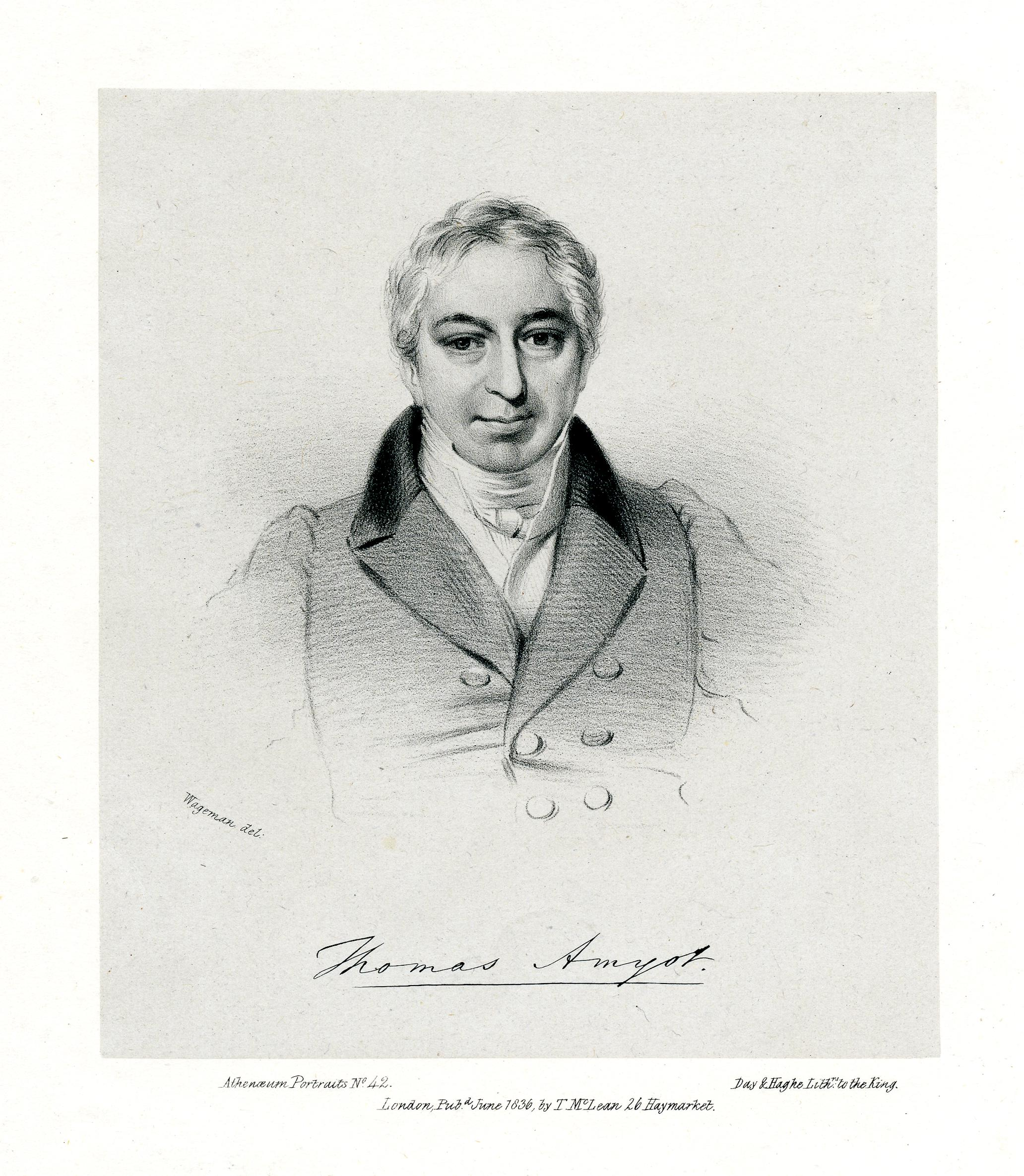
- Born: 7 January 1775
- Died: 28 September 1850 (aged 75)
- Children: 8

Thomas Amyot (7 January 1775 – 28 September 1850) was an English antiquarian.

== Early life ==
Amyot was born at Norwich on 7 January 1775, of Huguenot descent. Intended for the profession of a country attorney, he became an articled clerk with a Norwich law firm, before spending a year in London to complete his legal education. He then returned to Norwich to begin practice as a solicitor.

== Career ==
Having made the acquaintance of William Windham, he became that gentleman's agent in the general election of 1802, and a permanent friendship was established between them. Windham lost his seat in Norwich, which he had held for eighteen years, but was impressed by Amyot's abilities, and when he became war and colonial minister in 1806, he appointed him his private secretary. Amyot thereupon gave up his Norwich practice, and moved to London. When Windham died in 1810, Amyot collected his parliamentary speeches; and they were published, preceded by a memoir, in three volumes, in 1812.

By the influence of his political connections and the unbroken friendship of Windham, he obtained in succession several valuable appointments in the colonial department, including Registrar of Slaves, and Secretary and Registrar of Records in Upper Canada, a post in which he had permission to act by deputy. He thus acquired a position of independence, and he devoted the rest of his life to the illustration of English history through the medium of archaeology. He was elected a Fellow of the Royal Society(1824) and the Society of Antiquaries of London, and, having become treasurer of the latter society in 1823, he very actively promoted its interests. He contributed fifteen papers to the Transactions, and some time before his death he was appointed a vice-president of the society.

Amyot assisted in founding the Camden Society, and was one of its directors from 1839 until his death. He also largely aided the Percy, the Shakespeare, and other literary societies.

Besides those above mentioned, his writings include a description of Tewkesbury Abbey contributed to Vetusta Monumenta (vol. v.), and an edition of The Old Taming of a Shrew, upon which Shakespeare founded his Comedy, for the Shakespeare Society, printed in 1844.

Amyot was a favourite with all who knew him, well informed, accomplished, amiable, industrious. He collected a very fine library, and was always ready to give literary assistance. He died at his home at 13 James Street, Buckingham Gate, London, on 28 September 1850.

Amyot married, about the year 1806, Miss Colman of Norwich, with whom he had eight children. She died in 1848.
