= Ted R. Smith =

American aircraft designer (1906–1976)

- Born: Theodore Raymond Smith; 5 November 1906; Oroville, California, US
- Died: 29 December 1976 (aged 70)
- Resting place: Cremated, ashes spread by son via Aerostar over Oroville, California
- Education: Oakland Technical High School, Boeing School of Aeronautics

Ted R. Smith (1906–1976) was an American aircraft designer. He worked for the Douglas Aircraft Company, Aero Design and Engineering Company, and Rockwell Standard Corporation. In 40 years, his designs included the Douglas A-26 Invader (under the direction of Ed Heinemann), and the first all metal small twin engine business aircraft for Aero Commander, a company that he helped to start. The Aero Commander line included one of the first twin engined business jets, the Jet Commander. In the 1960s, he designed and manufactured the Aerostar line, under his own name. The Aerostar was later built by Piper Aircraft, as the Piper Aerostar.

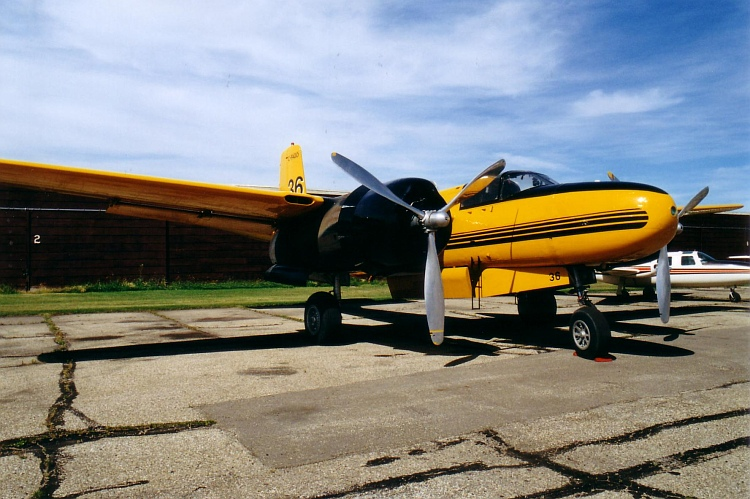
Douglas A-26C Invader on aerial firefighting duty

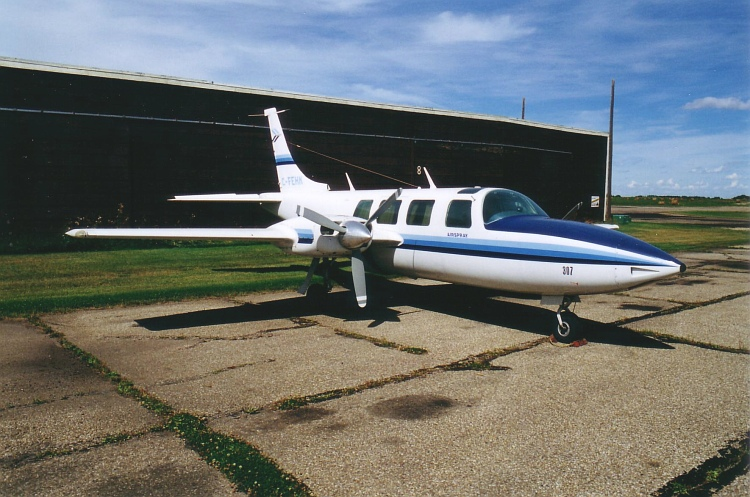
Ted Smith Aerostar 600

Smith was born in Oroville, California. His family later moved to Oakland, California, in 1916, where he graduated Oakland Technical High School in 1925 and soon developed his first aircraft, a tube and fabric glider. In 1929, Smith graduated from the Boeing School of Aeronautics. In 1935, Smith started his career at Douglas as a tool designer that would lead him to work on the B-18, B-23, and finally lead engineer on the A-20 project supervising 500 employees before leaving to form his own company.
