= List of highest points in London =

The 21 distinct points of land over 100 metres in height in the county of Greater London.

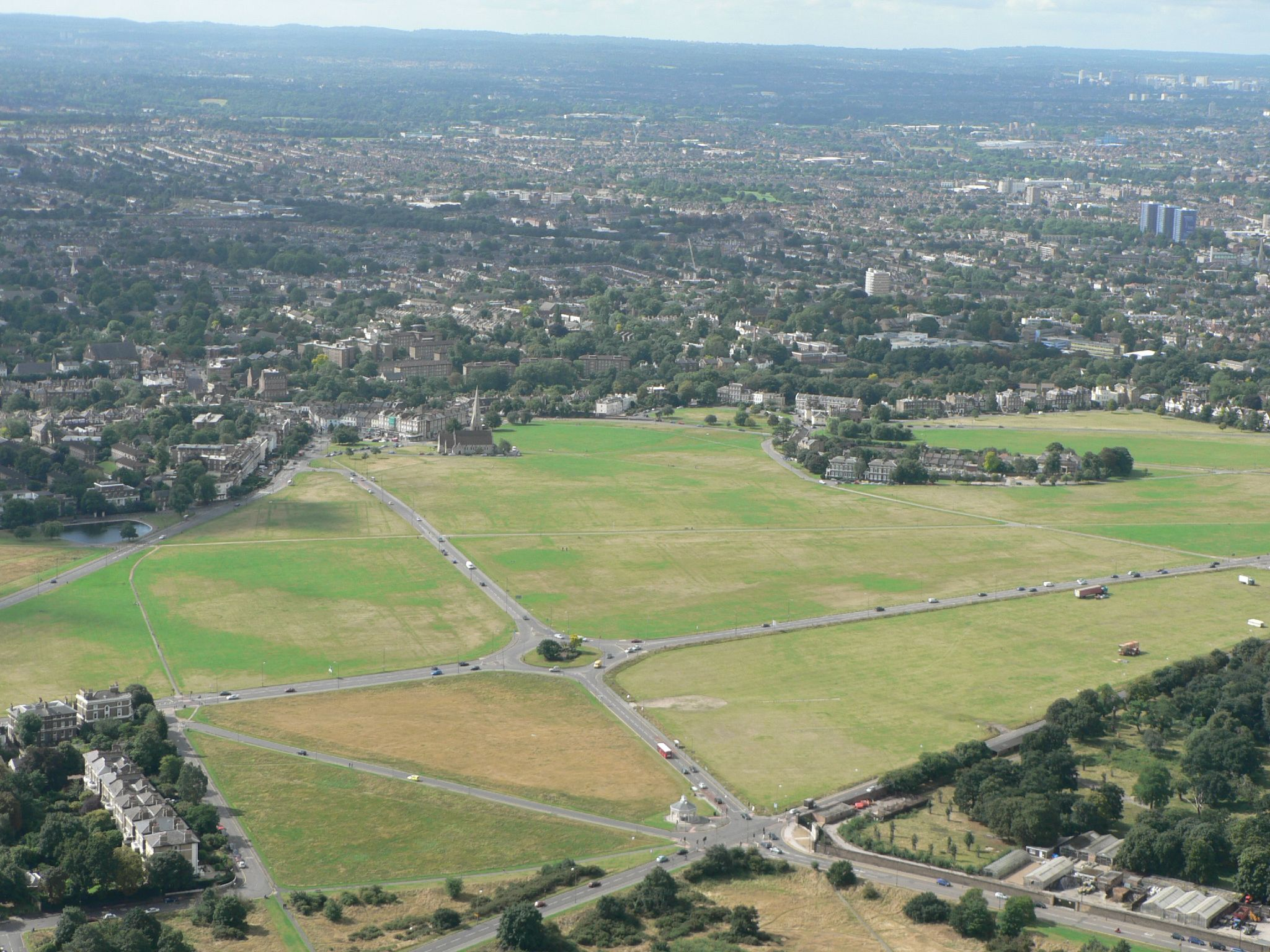
Blackheath is a minor ridge after a short dip reaching a peak at Shooter's Hill in the east; here the towers of central Lewisham and Croydon beyond to the south-west (right). The backdrop is the long crest of the North Downs in the far south of Bromley and adjoining Surrey

This is a list of the highest natural points within the 1,569 km^{2} (606 sq mi) area of Greater London, England. The list includes all 21 peaks at least 100 metres high.

One is an isolated hill, at Harrow on the Hill – the other 20 summits are clustered on six ridges (escarpments) in London, four of which extend beyond London and are named: Blackheath Ridge, one of the North Weald Ridges, the North Downs ridge and the Grim's Ditch ridge.

The highest point of land, the 245 m (804 ft) Westerham Heights, was also higher than any man-made structure in London until 2012, when the 309 m (1,014 ft) tall Shard London Bridge was completed. The highest point in London is the top of Crystal Palace transmitting station. This 219 m (719 ft) tall structure stands upon a rise that is itself 109 metres (358 ft) high, a combined height of 328 metres (1,076 ft).

== List ==
Rank	Name and location	London borough	OS grid reference	Height
1	Westerham Heights	Bromley	TQ436564 (51.288°N 0.060°E)	245 metres (804 ft)
2	Sanderstead Plantation	Croydon	TQ343618 (51.339°N 0.072°W)	175 metres (574 ft)
3	Stanmore Hill	Harrow	TQ164934 (51.627°N 0.318°W)	152 metres (499 ft)
4	Big Wood peak, north of Manor Hill/Corrigan Avenue Rec. Ground	Sutton	TQ282598 (51.322°N 0.160°W)	150 metres (492 ft)
5	Arkley	Barnet	TQ219956 (51.645°N 0.238°W)	147 metres (482 ft)
6	Highwood Hill/Moat Mount, Totteridge Fields	Barnet	TQ218941 (51.632°N 0.240°W)	145 metres (476 ft)
7	Harrow Weald Common	Harrow	TQ149931 (51.624°N 0.340°W)	145 metres (475 ft)
8 (Note: this summit in Hampstead Heath is the highest point in Inner London and was the highest point of the former County of London.)	Hampstead Heath: west of Spaniards Road	Camden	TQ264869 (51.567°N 0.177°W)	137 metres (449 ft)
9	Highgate: Gatehouse, North Road to Hillcrest, off the top of North Hill	Haringey	TQ282878 (51.574°N 0.150°W)	136 metres (446 ft)
10	Shooter's Hill	Greenwich	TQ438765 (51.469°N 0.071°E)	132 metres (433 ft)
11	Pinner Hill	Harrow / Hillingdon	TQ107916 (51.612°N 0.401°W)	126 metres (413 ft)
12	London part of Woodcock Hill, north of Scratchwood	Barnet	TQ201953 (51.643°N 0.264°W)	125 metres (410 ft)
13	Harrow on the Hill (occasionally "Harrow Hill")	Harrow	TQ153874 (51.573°N 0.336°W)	124 metres (408 ft)
14	Bournwell Hill	Barnet / Enfield	TQ256976 (51.663°N 0.184°W)	115 metres (377 ft)
15	Sydenham Hill (Crystal Palace)	Lewisham / Southwark	TQ340721 (51.432°N 0.072°W)	112 metres (367 ft)
16	Westow Hill (Crystal Palace)	Bromley / Croydon / Lambeth	TQ337707 (51.419°N 0.077°W)	110 metres (361 ft)
17	Forest Hill	Lewisham	TQ350735 (51.446°N 0.063°W)	106 metres (348 ft)
18	Orange Tree Hill, Havering-atte-Bower	Havering	TQ512930 (51.615°N 0.184°E)	105 metres (344 ft)
19	Muswell Hill	Haringey	TQ283896 (51.590°N 0.148°W)	105 metres (344 ft)
20	Woodcock Hill, Harefield	Hillingdon	TQ067915 (51.612°N 0.459°W)	103 metres (338 ft)
21	Ferny Hill (Enfield Chase)	Enfield	TQ280979 (51.665°N 0.149°W)	102 metres (334 ft)

== See also ==
- List of highest points in the United Kingdom
- List of tallest buildings and structures in London
