= Scratchwood and Moat Mount Local Nature Reserve =

Scratchwood and Moat Mount Local Nature Reserve may refer to:

- Moat Mount Open Space
- Scratchwood
