= Cherry Tree Wood =

Park in London, England

Coordinates: 51.5859°N 0.1598°W

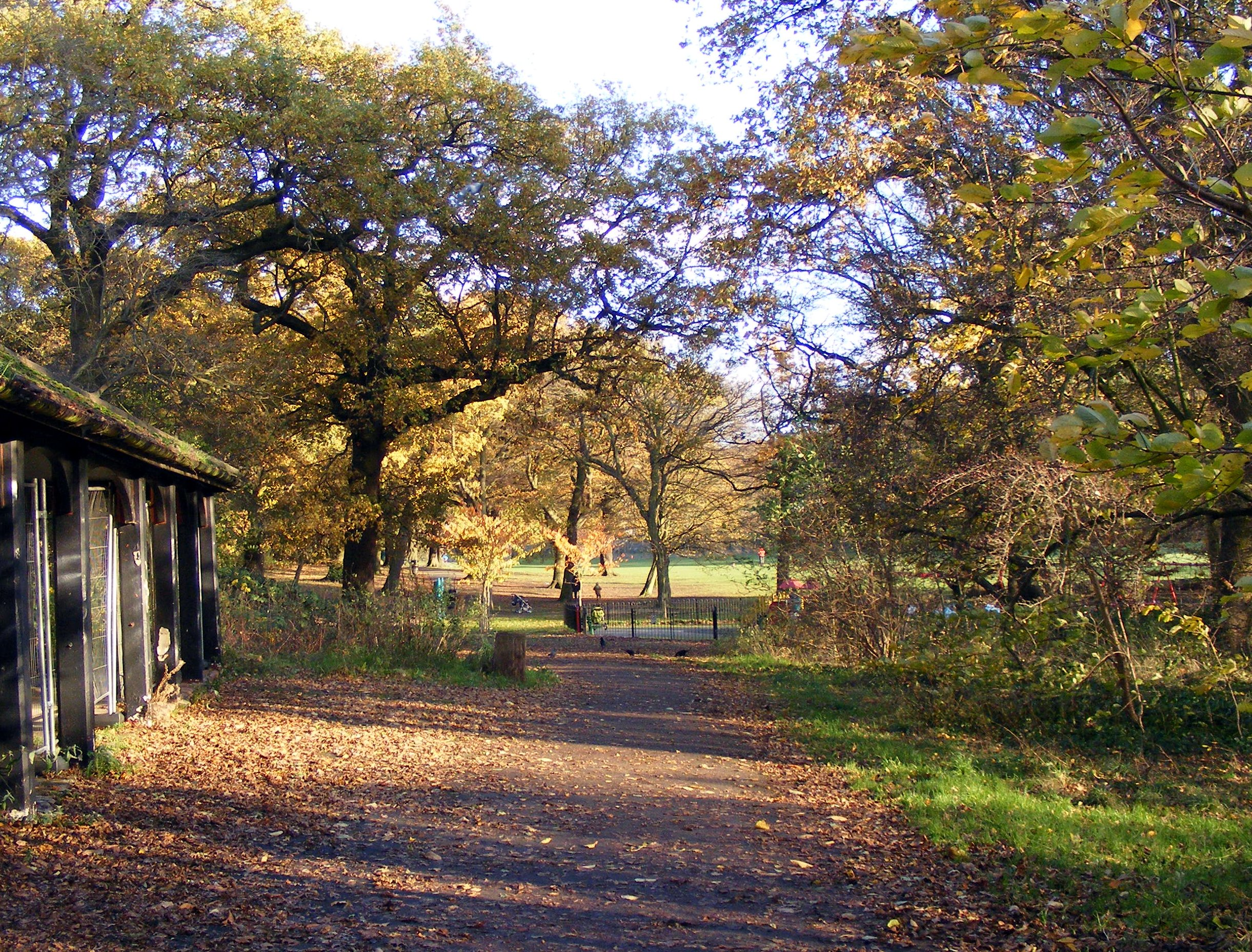
Cherry Tree Wood in autumn

Cherry Tree Wood is a 5.3-hectare park in East Finchley in the London Borough of Barnet. It is a Site of Local Importance for Nature Conservation. Located opposite East Finchley Underground station, it contains woodland and grassland, a playground, tennis courts, a cafe and toilets.

The history of the wood may date back to prehistoric times. The wood in this area likely served as a source to fire nearby Roman kilns around AD50-AD160. The first mention of the park is from the 13th century as the hunting grounds of the Bishop of London. It is a remnant of the large medieval wood called Finchley Wood, which was shown in Great Hornsey Park in John Rocque's map of 1754. It was later known as Dirthouse Wood because the night soil and horse manure from London's streets was brought to the Dirthouse, now the White Lion pub next to East Finchley Station, as fertiliser for hay meadows. In 1914 it was purchased by Finchley Council from the Ecclesiastical Commissioners to create a public park.

Until it became a public park, hornbeam trees were cut back every few years to provide wood for charcoal, while oaks were allowed to grow to their full height for timber. Now that coppicing has ceased the hornbeams have grown tall and rangy, and the wood has grown shaded. Wood anemone and other ancient plants can be found in the spring, and Eurasian nuthatch and great spotted woodpecker are often seen.

Mutton Brook rises in Cherry Tree Wood, and the Capital Ring between Hendon and Highgate passes through it.

== See also ==
- Barnet parks and open spaces
- Nature reserves in Barnet
