= Dollis Valley Greenwalk =

Ten-mile-long footpath in North London

Coordinates: 51.6025°N 0.2065°W

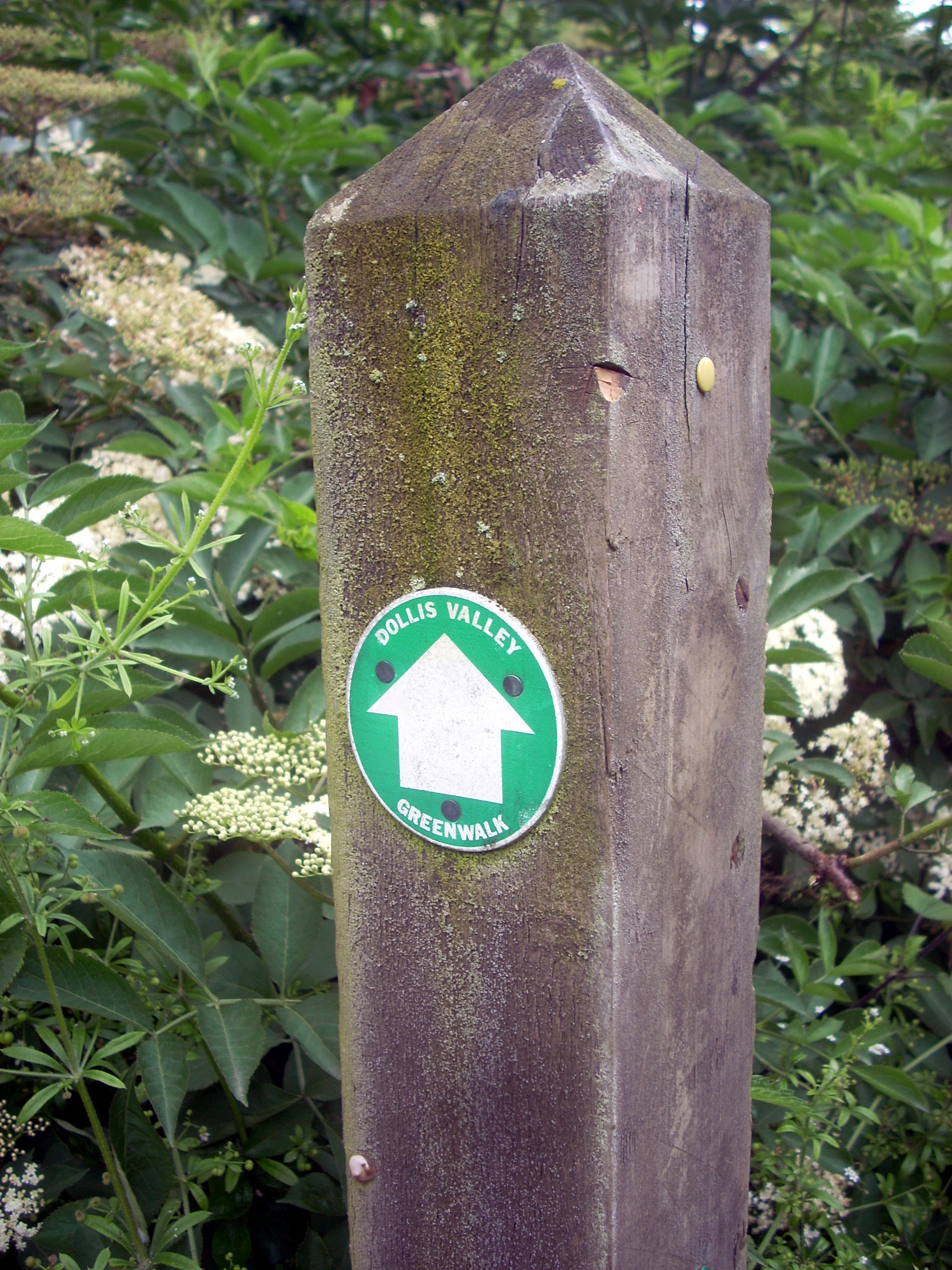
- The Dollis Valley Greenwalk's logo, a white arrow on green, marks the route
- Length: 10 mi (16 km)
- Location: London Borough of Barnet, England
- Use: Hiking
- Season: All year

The Dollis Valley Greenwalk (or Green Walk) is a footpath route in the London Borough of Barnet in London, England, between Moat Mount Nature Reserve in Mill Hill and Hampstead Heath. The route is designed to act as a link between the Capital Ring and the London Loop, and between the many green spaces and wildlife corridors along the way. It is approximately 10 miles (16 km) long. It mainly follows the Dollis Brook and is one of the many parks and open spaces in Barnet.

== History ==
Dollis Valley Greenwalk is based on the Brookside Walk, built by Finchley Council (now part of Barnet) in the 1930s. It was the brainchild of leading Finchley Councillor, Alfred Pike, and followed Mutton Brook west from Falloden Way to its junction with Dollis Brook, and then the Dollis north to the Finchley boundary in Wyatts Farm Open Space, opposite Walfield Avenue. Mutton Brook was the southern boundary of the borough and Dollis Brook the western one, and the walk was almost all built on the Finchley side. At Westbury Road, the gardens come down to the brook, so Pike persuaded Hendon Councillors to acquire the land on their side of the brook so that the walk could cross over to the Hendon side for this stretch.

The Greenwalk itself was developed by the London Borough of Barnet with the Countryside Commission (now Natural England) and the Countryside Management Service. In March 2009, the Dollis Valley Greenwalk won a £400,000 grant from the Mayor of London's Help a London park scheme by public vote. The grant was planned to be used to improve footpaths, cycle paths, lighting, entrances for safer walking, accessibility, which includes making it a safe route for walking between communities and play facilities. It was also used for the improvement of existing habitats and the creation of new ones such as wetland woodland and reedbed, enhancement of hay meadows, landscaping, and finally the addition of information boards, fingerposts and other features to increase enjoyability and awareness of points of interest.

== Route ==
Starting at the northern end, the route commences in Moat Mount Open Space. It then skirts Barnet Gate Wood, and goes through Totteridge Fields nature reserve, and by fields and public open spaces through Totteridge, Whetstone and Woodside Park. It passes under Dollis Brook Viaduct and through Windsor Open Space, and on to the end of Dollis Brook where it merges with Mutton Brook to become the River Brent. It then follows Mutton Brook and goes through Little Wood and Big Wood, ending at Hampstead Heath Extension in Hampstead Garden Suburb. The waymarks consist mostly of a simple green disc with a directional white arrow mounted on a wooden post. From Woodside Park south, the walk is mainly flat and partly surfaced, and is thought to be suitable for wheelchair users and pushchairs, but some sections between Woodside Park and Mill Hill can get very muddy and walking shoes may be advisable.

The southern end starts on the edge of Hampstead Heath Extension at the end of a short pathway from Meadway Close, Hampstead Garden Suburb. It goes along Meadway Close and Bigwood Road to Big Wood and Denman Drive South. It then goes through Little Wood Nature Reserve to Addison Way. It turns left along Addison Way and right into a path opposite Erskine Hill. It follows Mutton Brook across Finchley Road at Henlys Corner and under North Circular Road, and turns right where Mutton Brook meets Dollis Brook near Bridge Lane. From here it follows Dollis Brook under Hendon Lane to Windsor Open Space. It crosses Waverley Grove to leave Windsor Open Space at Thornfield Avenue. It then turns right along Dollis Road under Dollis Brook Viaduct, and left to follow the brook to Fursby Avenue and through Riverside Walk to Argyle Road.

In the next section, the route turns right to a footbridge across the brook and then turns left along Holden Road, left again down Tillingham Way and then right to rejoin Dollis Brook in Laurel Way Open Space. It crosses Laurel Way and then goes through the meadowland and trees of Whetstone Stray to Totteridge Lane. It turns right along the Lane and then left just before Totteridge and Whetstone Underground station. This is the only place on the route with shops and toilets.

The route continues through Brook Farm Open Space and Wyatts Farm Open Space to Western Way, and then through Barnet Playing Fields to Barnet Lane and Dollis Brook Walk. It then keeps to the right of the brook through Ducks Island until a narrow metal bridge. It crosses the bridge and turns right through fields for 1000 yards (leaving Dollis Brook, which now goes through private land) until it reaches a playing field, which is exited by a gap in the hedge on the left, It then goes through Totteridge Fields (a nature reserve which is a Site of Metropolitan Importance run by London Wildlife Trust) to Hendon Wood Lane. It turns right along Hendon Wood Lane and after about 500 yards continues along a path on the left, which skirts Barnet Gate Wood. At the end of the Wood the path bears left between hedges. A small pond on the right with a pipe under the path to a stream, which is often dry, is one of the sources of the Dollis Brook. The path then goes through fields to Moat Mount Local Nature Reserve. (When a route marker points half left off the main track, the path goes through the kissing gate opposite.) The route then goes through fields and a wood to wooden steps, where it turns right, finishing at the nature reserve's closed car park on the east side of Barnet Way, part of the A1, and a dual carriageway with no access from the northbound lane.

== Gallery ==
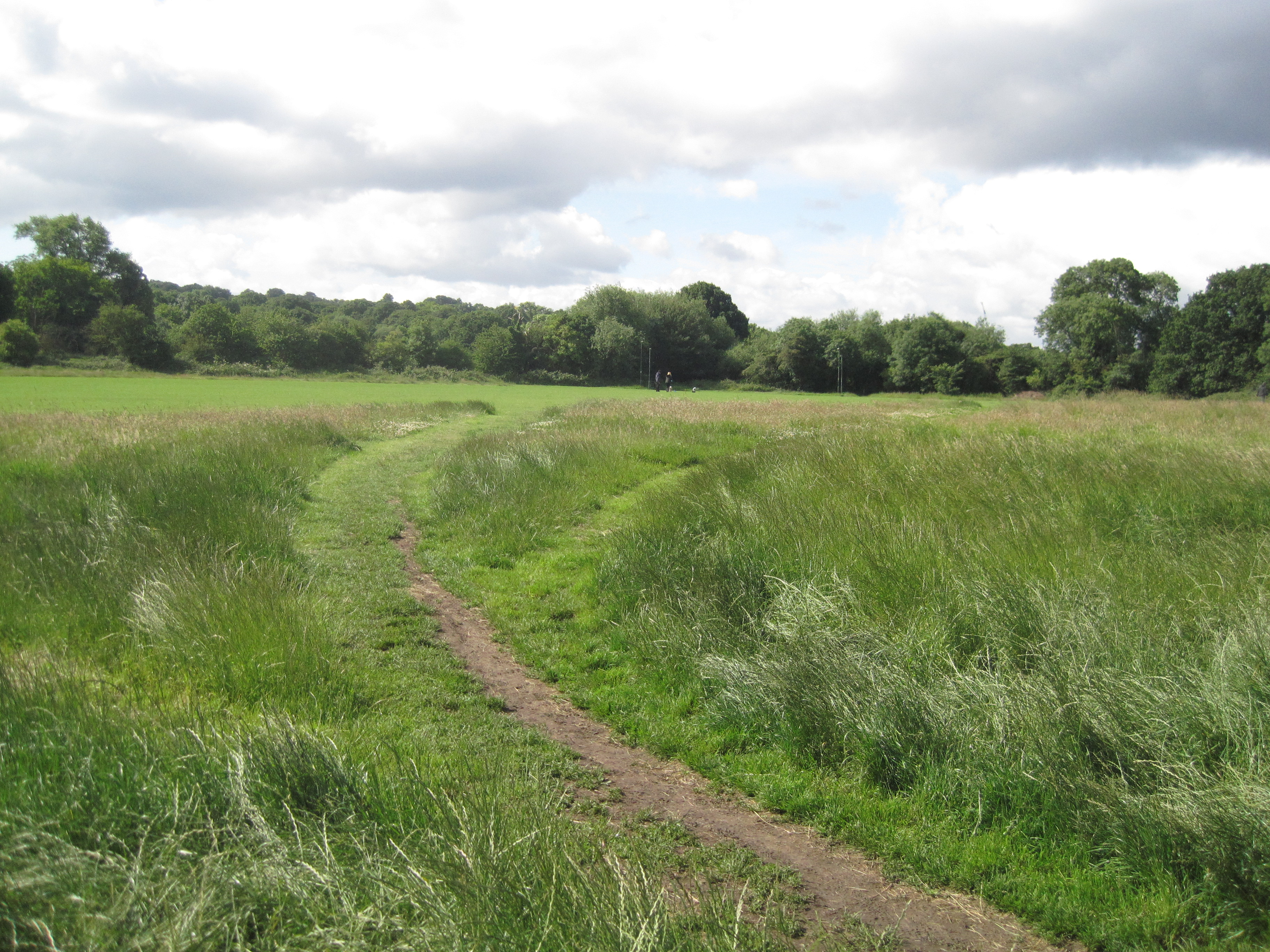
Hampstead Heath Extension

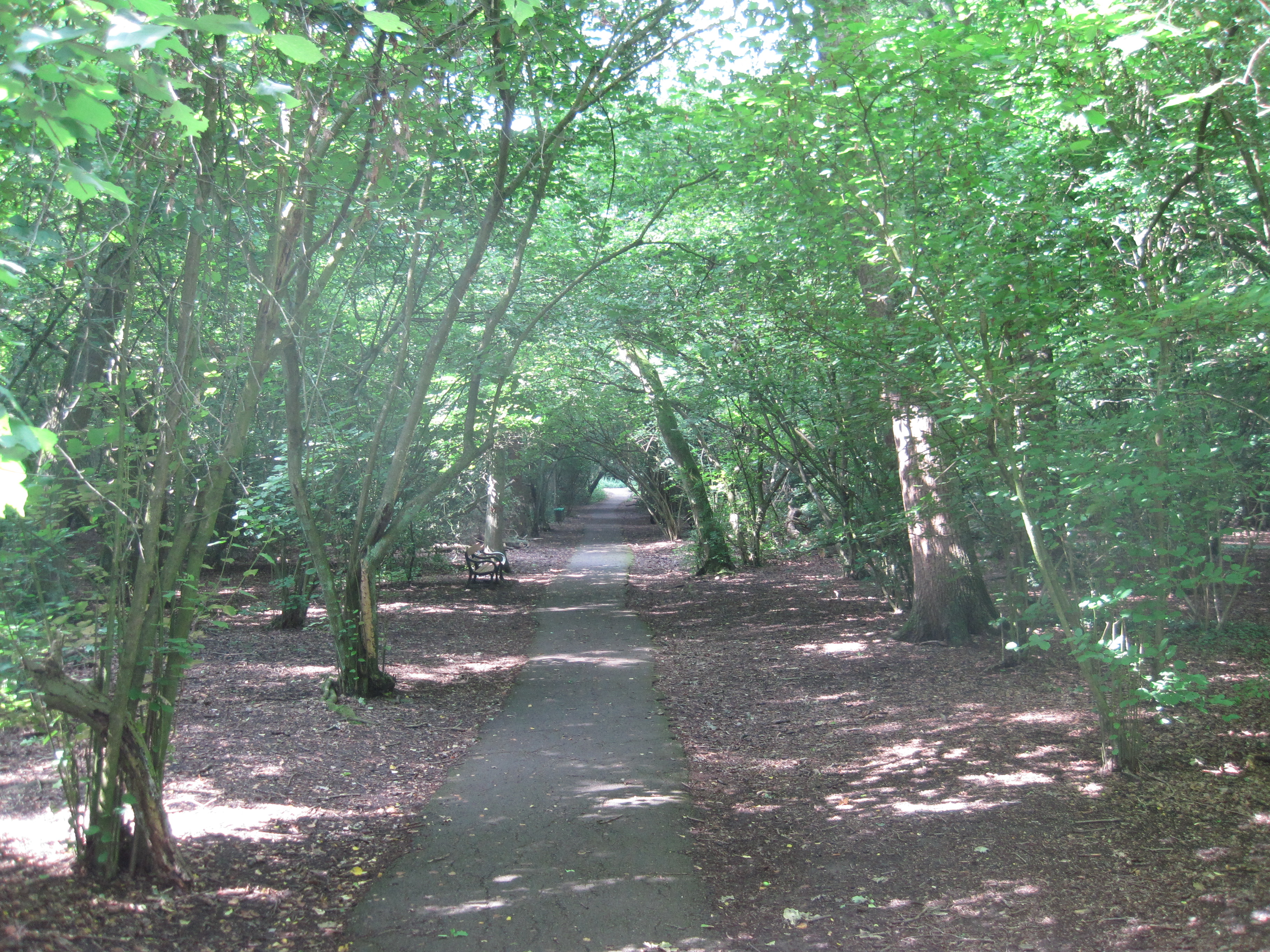
Big Wood, Hampstead Garden Suburb

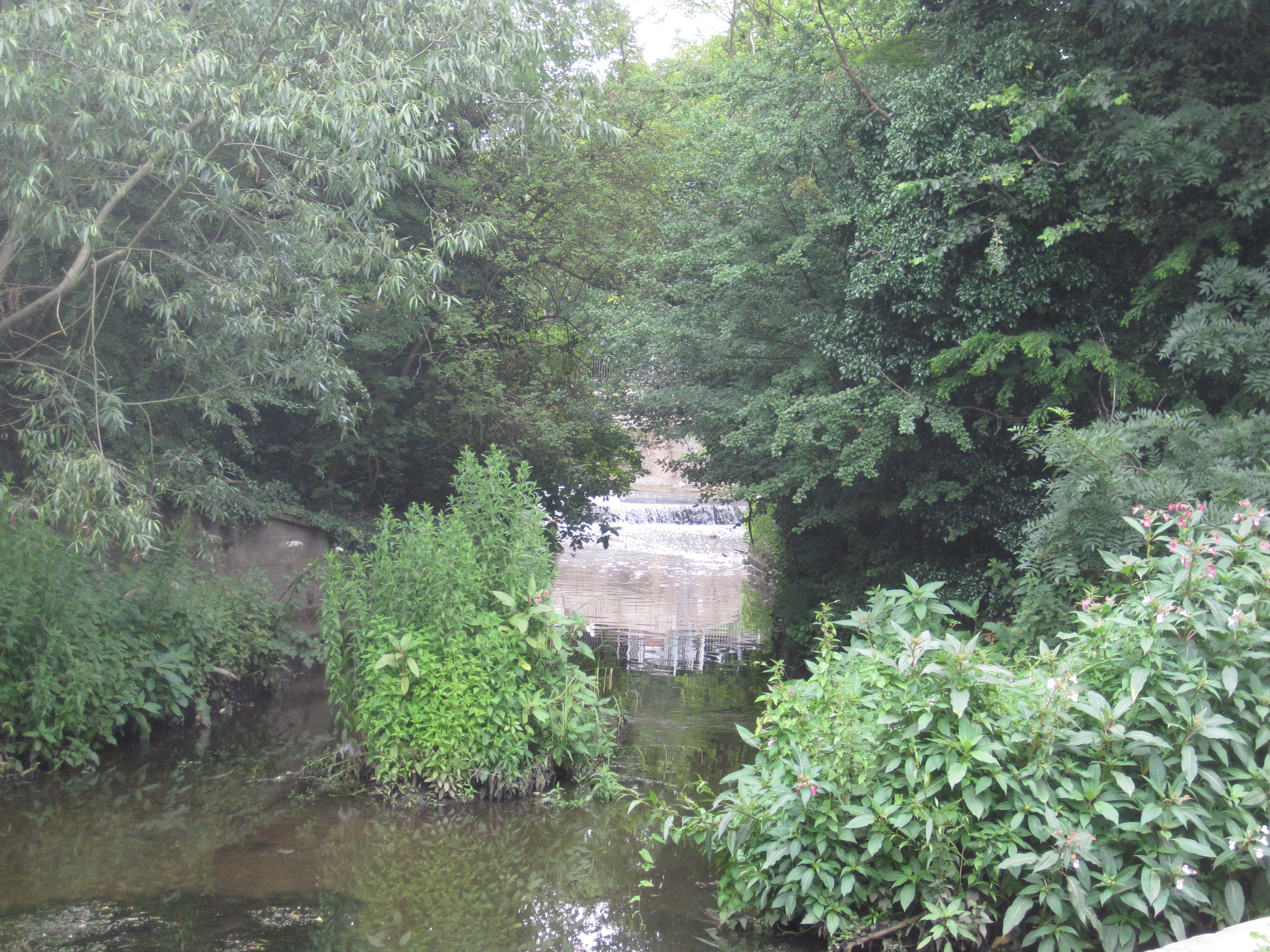
Hendon Lane Weir, Dollis Brook

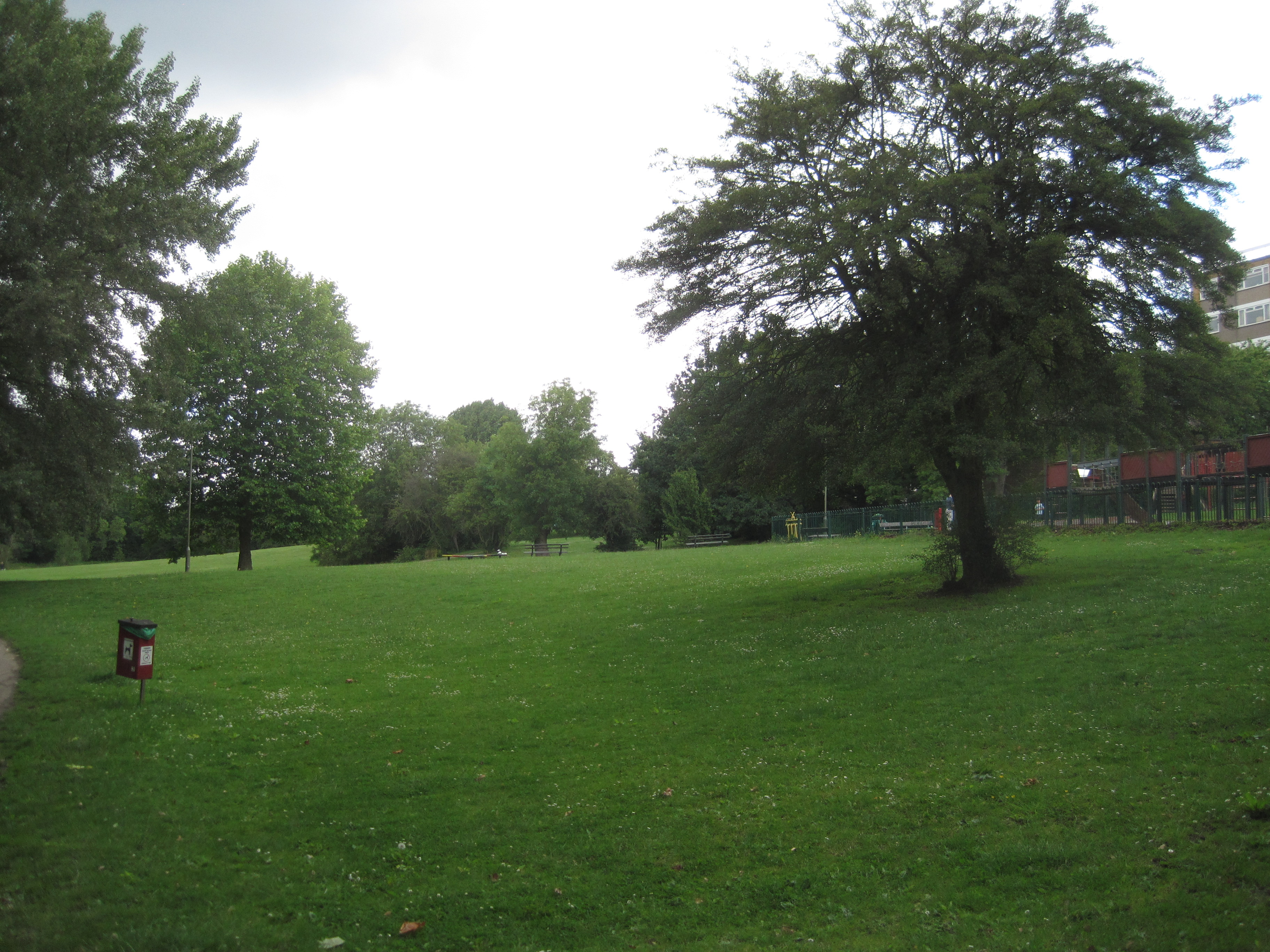
Windsor Open Space, Finchley

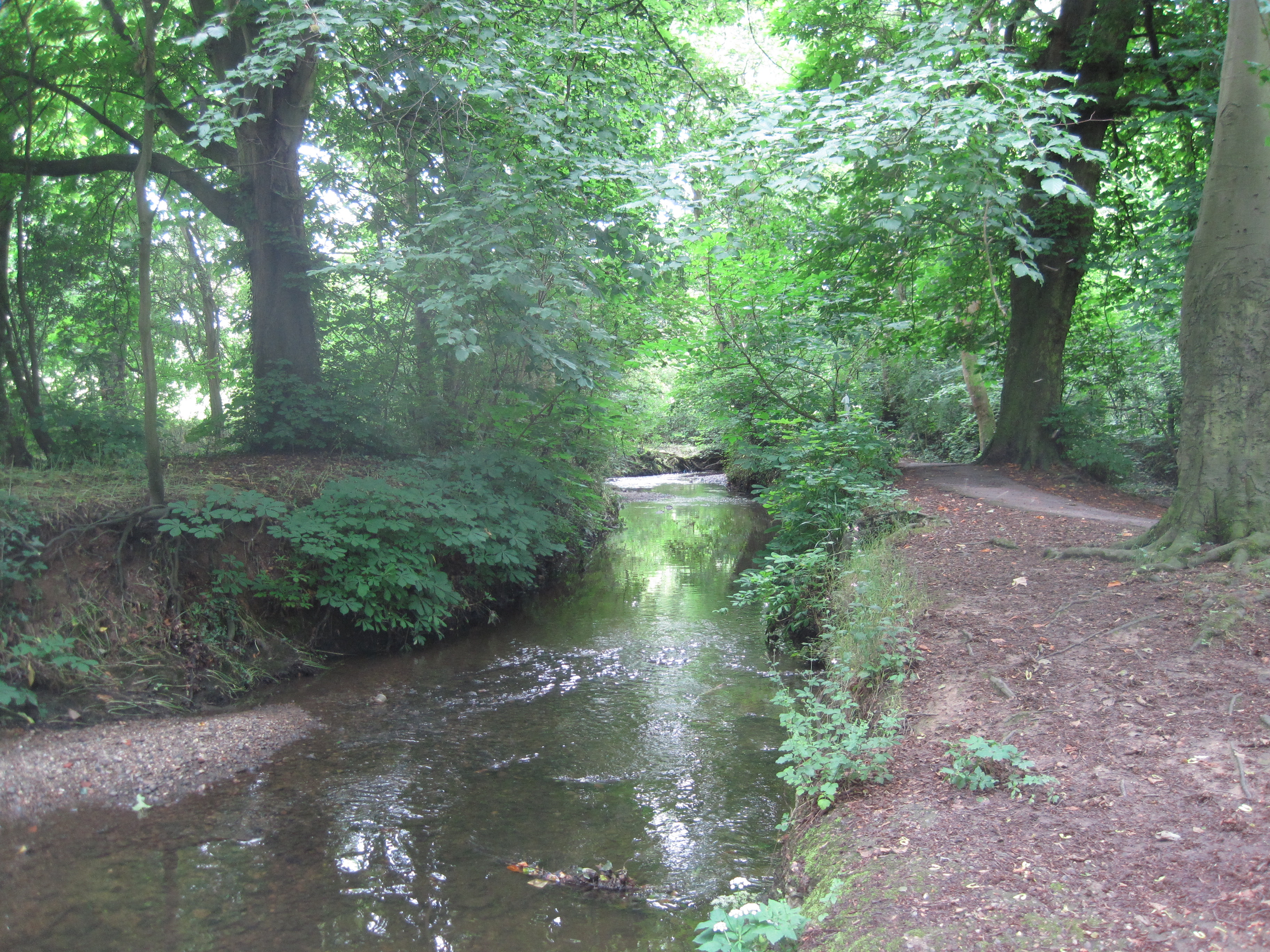
Dollis Brook near Dollis Brook Viaduct

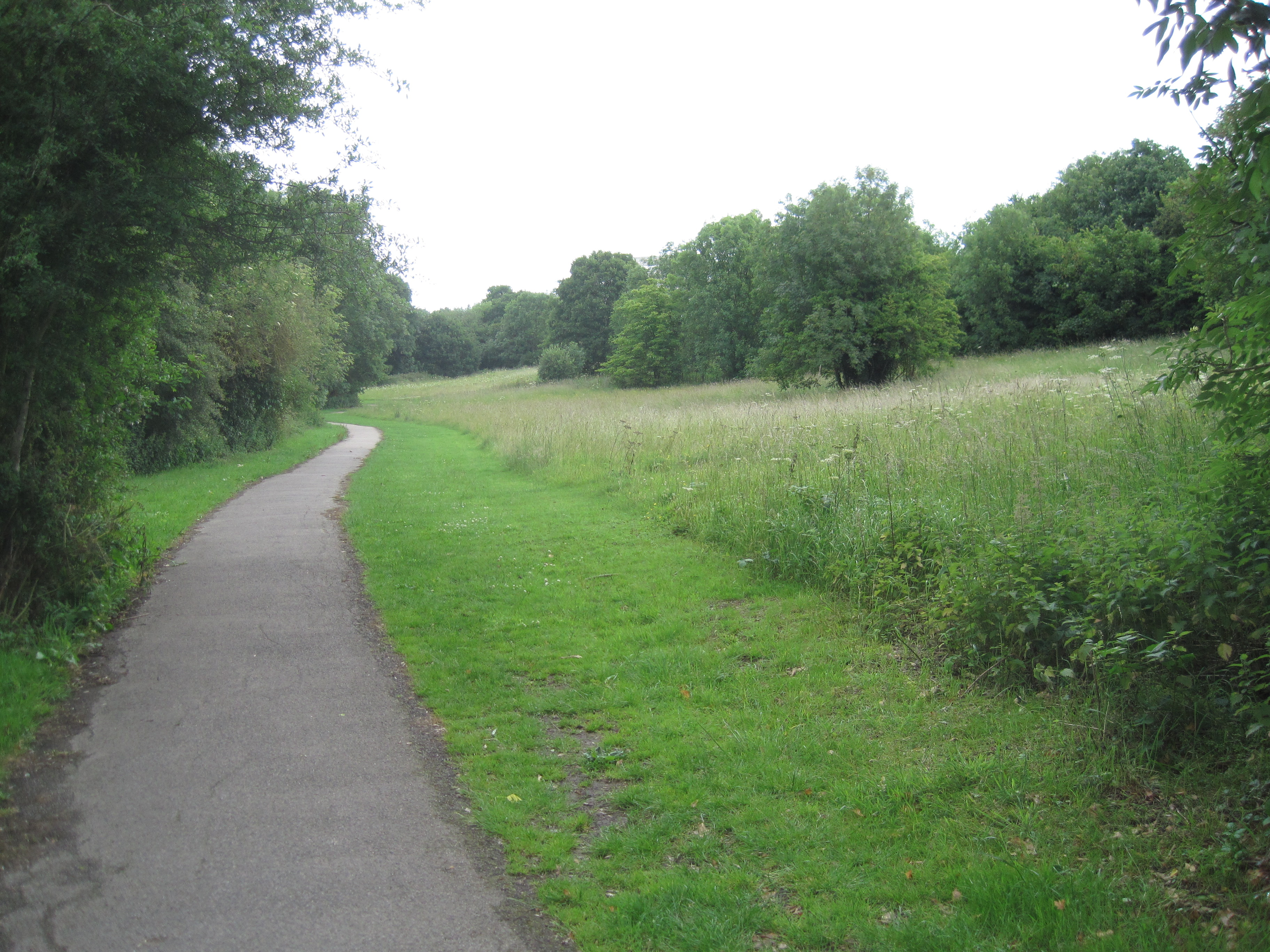
Whetstone Stray, Whetstone

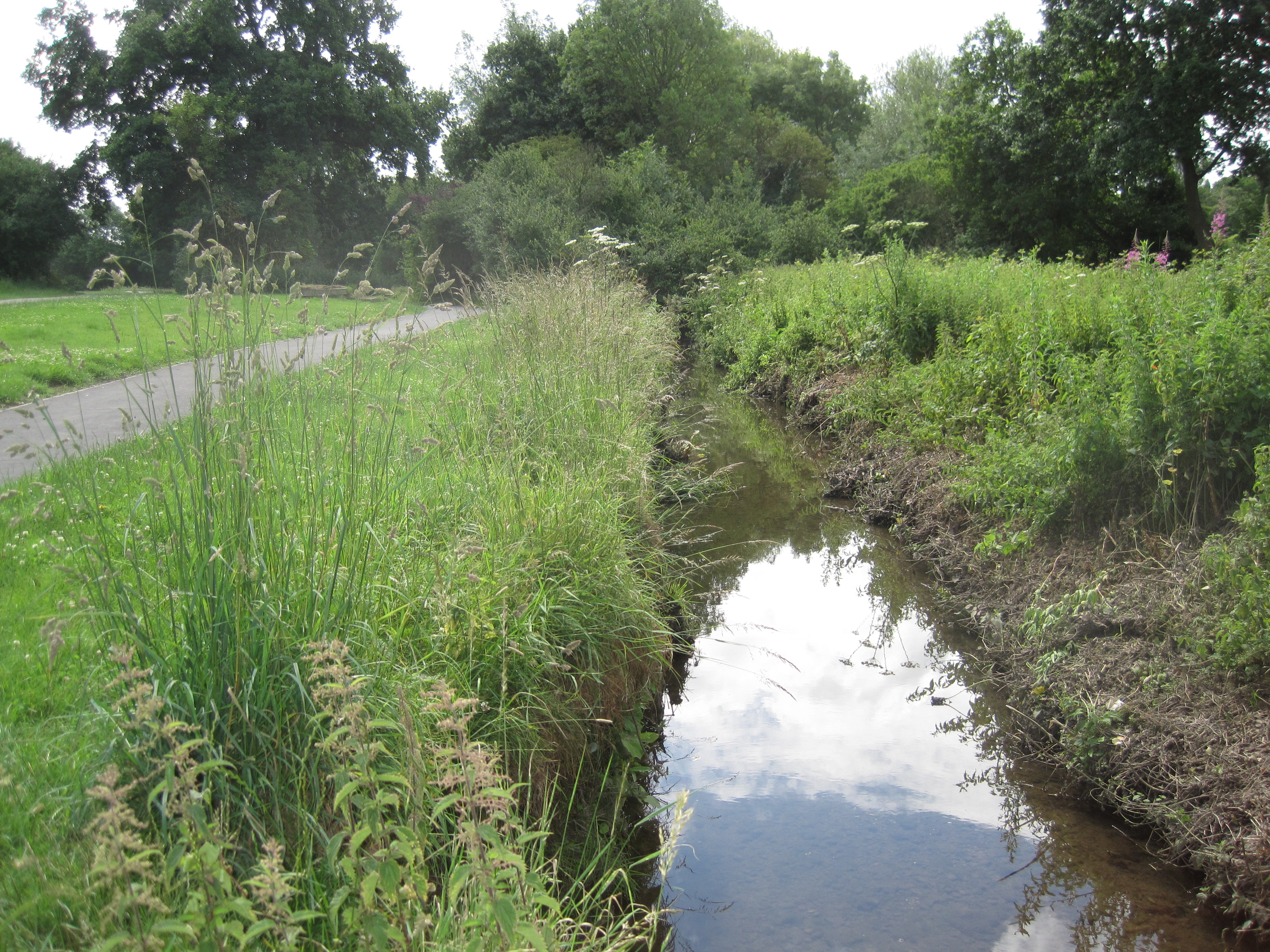
Dollis Brook in Wyatt Farm Open Space, Whetstone

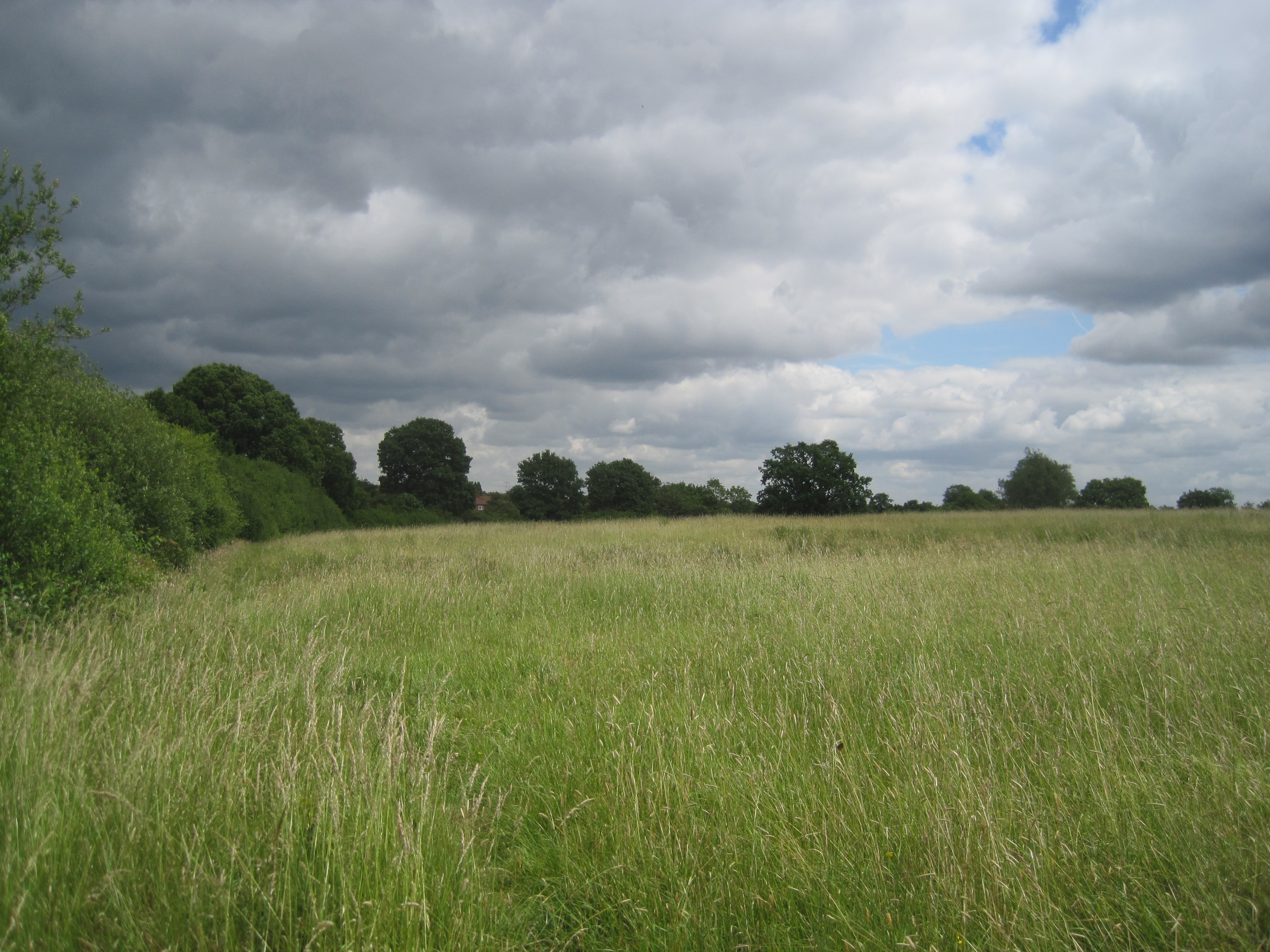
Totteridge Park Open Space

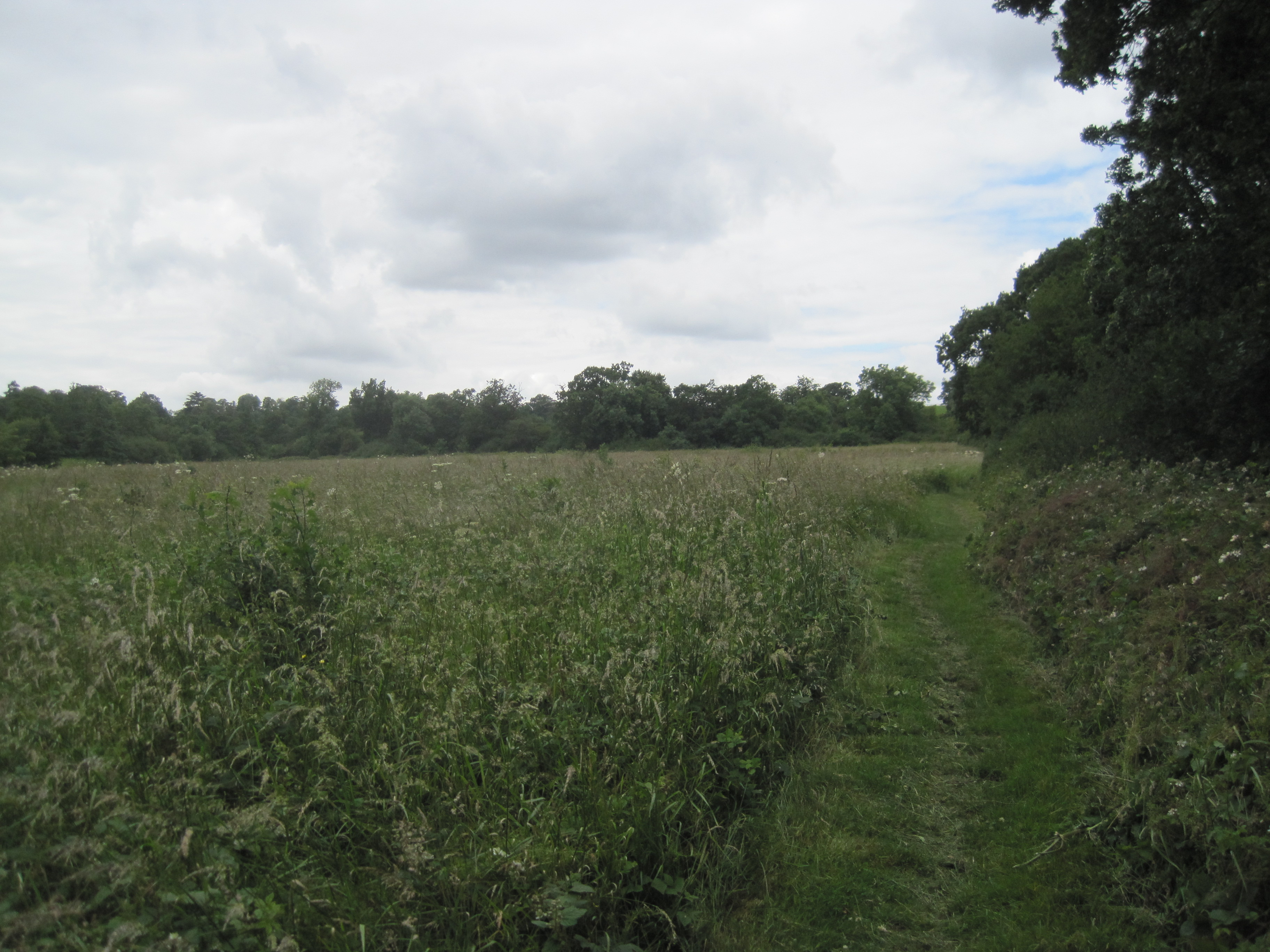
Totteridge Fields

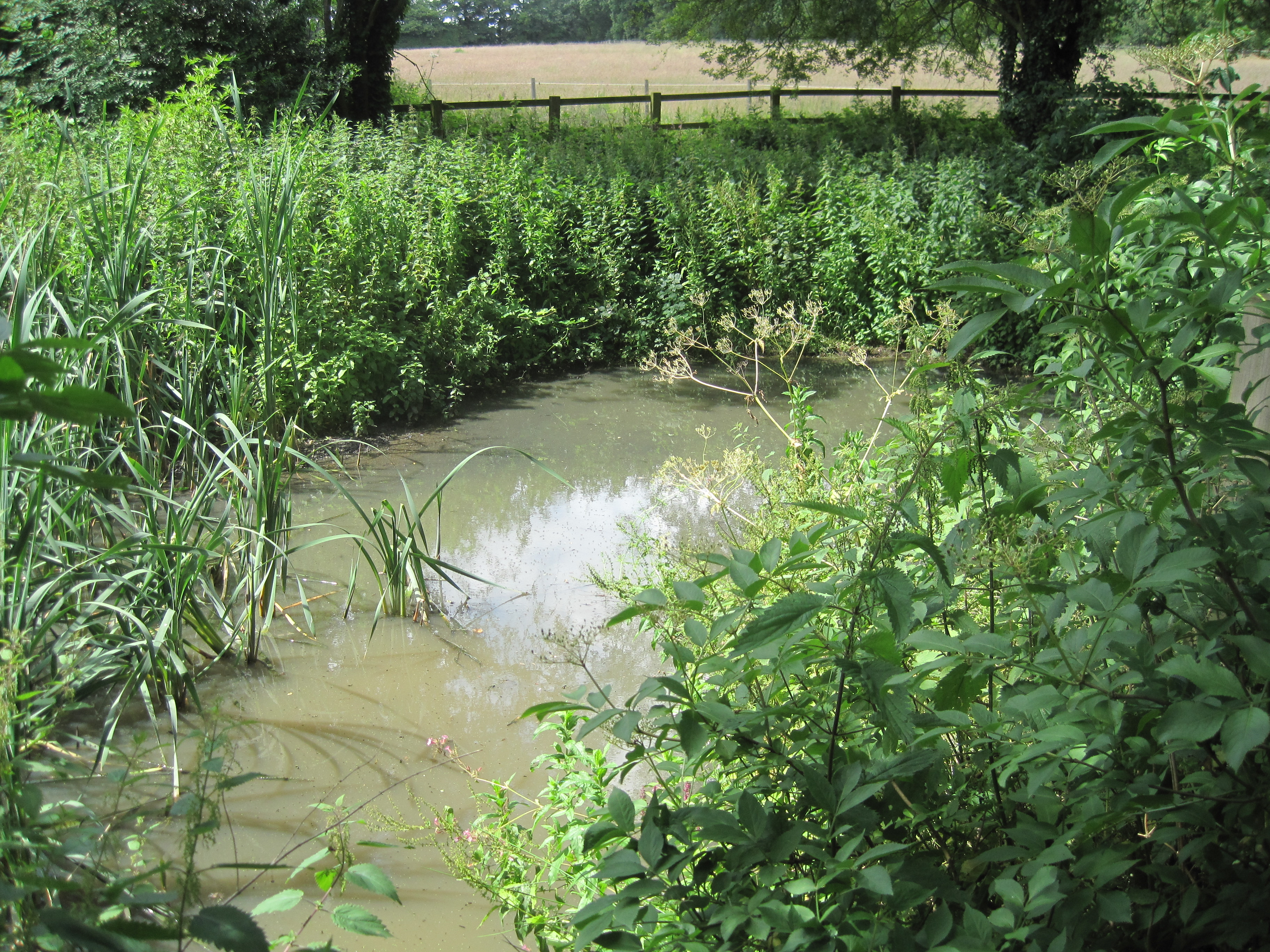
Source of Dollis Brook, Moat Mount Open Space

== See also ==
- Parks and open spaces in Barnet
