= Mutton Brook =

River in London, England

Coordinates: 51.58721°N 0.21049°W

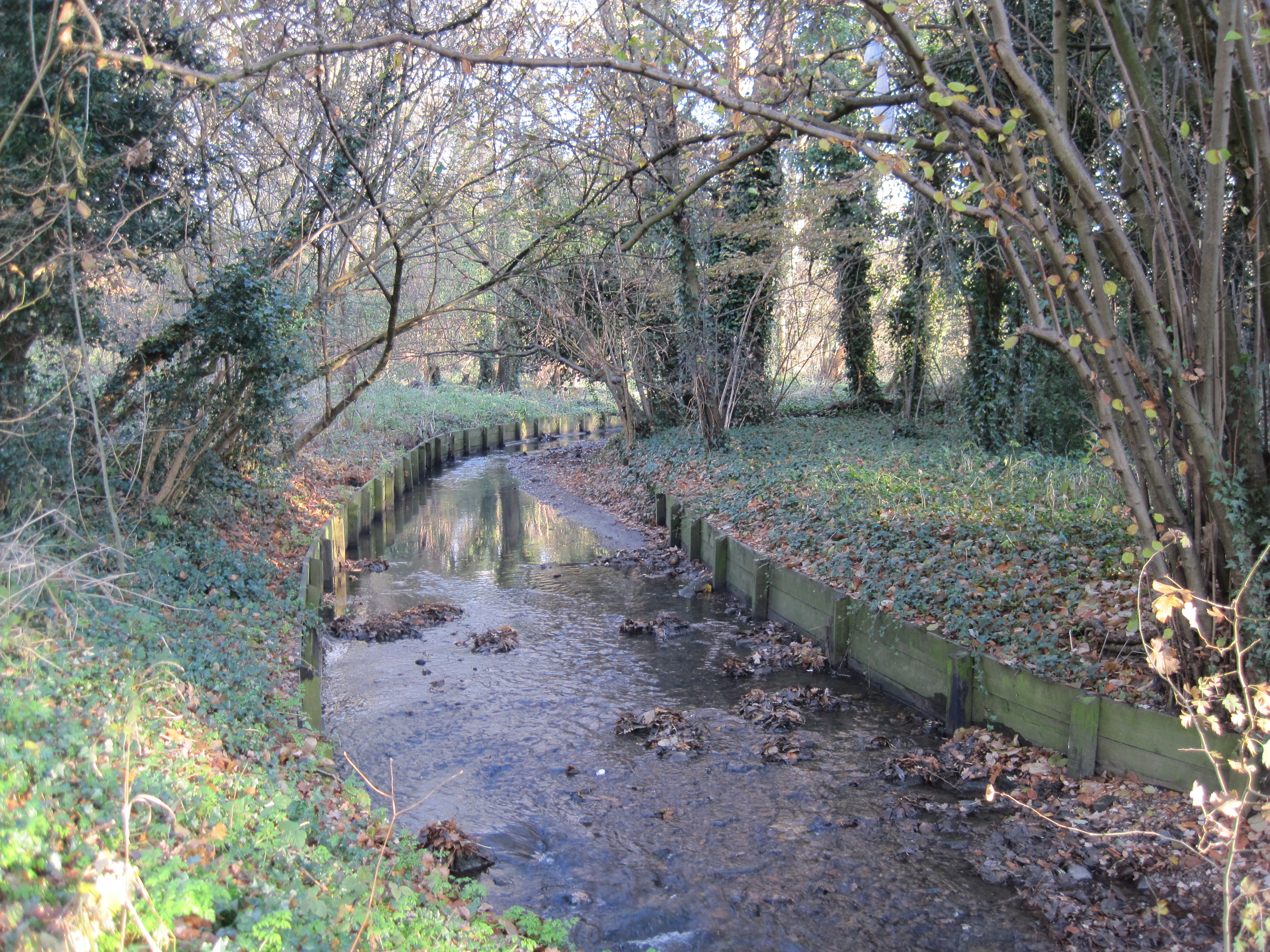
Mutton Brook in Brookside Walk

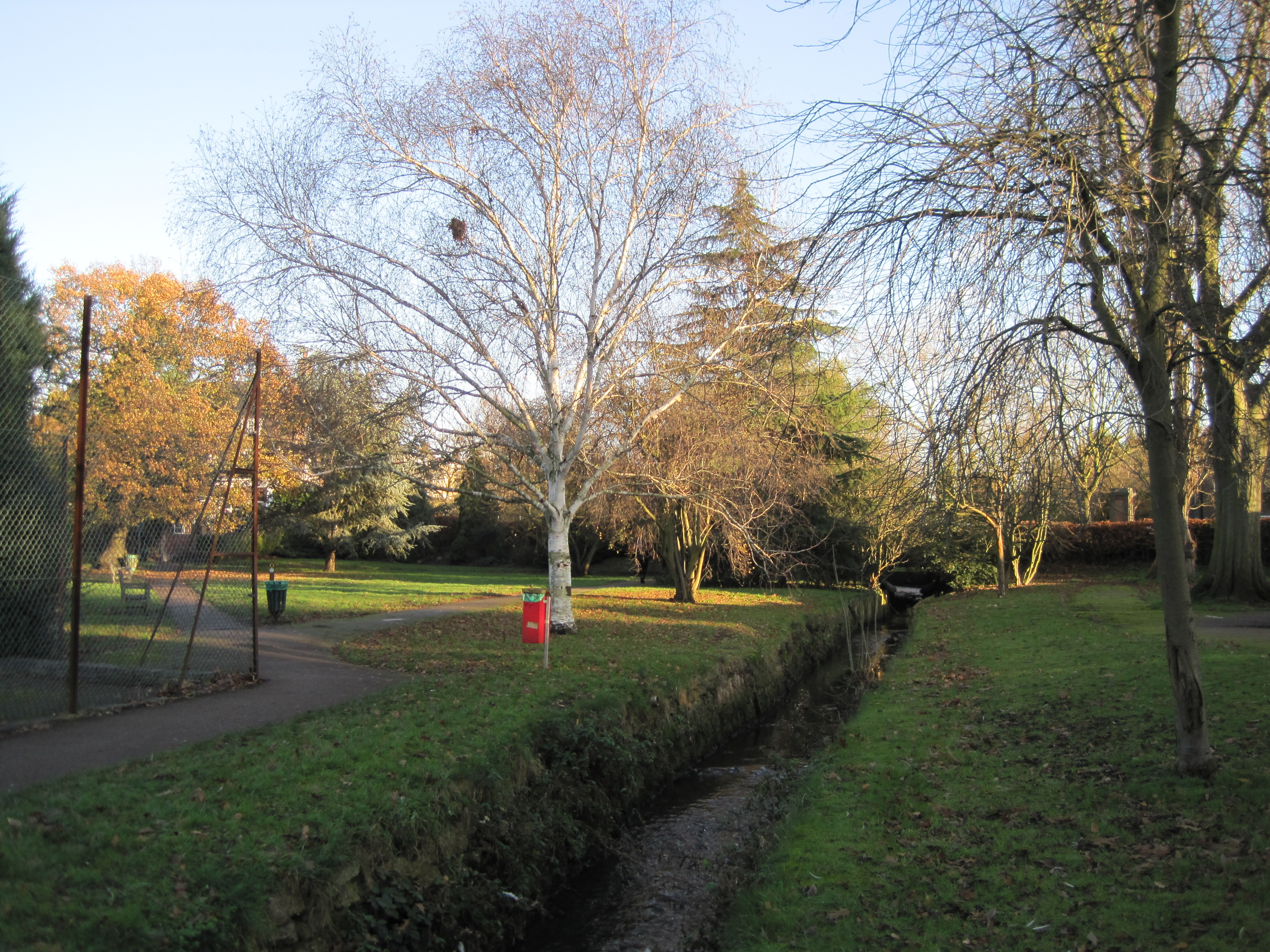
Mutton Brook in Northway Gardens

Mutton Brook is a stream which runs between East Finchley and Hendon in the London Borough of Barnet. It is a tributary of the River Brent, which is itself a tributary of the River Thames.

The brook rises in Cherry Tree Wood and flows underground to emerge at the back of Belvedere Court, Lyttleton Road. It then passes under Lyttleton Road and flows along the south side of the road and Falloden Way through Lyttleton Playing Fields, Fletchers Gardens and Northway Gardens. Near Brookland Rise, it crosses briefly to the north side of Falloden Way before crossing back to Brookside Walk. It passes under Finchley Road at Henlys Corner and then under the North Circular Road to meet Dollis Brook close to Bridge Lane. The two brooks then become the River Brent.

The brook is confined in a concrete or wood channel along the whole of its length, and the water quality is often poor. However, from Lyttleton Playing Fields to the junction with Dollis Brook its route is almost all through local parks. The downstream section is lined by oak, ash and willow trees, providing a good habitat for birds, and grey wagtails often forage at its edge. The brook is a Site of Local Importance for Nature Conservation.

Until 1965, Mutton Brook was the southern boundary of the Municipal Borough of Finchley.

The Capital Ring and Dollis Valley Greenwalk follow Mutton Brook.

== See also ==
- Nature reserves in Barnet
