= Frank Davis (Liberal politician) =

British politician

Davis in 1968

Frank Liberal Davis (June 1920 - unknown) was a British Liberal Party politician who successfully campaigned to have political party names included on the ballot paper for UK elections. He served as Mayor of Finchley.

== Background ==
He was born as Frank Davis. He was educated at elementary and central schools and at Regent Street Polytechnic. In 1946 he co-founded the Jewish soccer club, Wingate F.C. The Frank Davis clock on the Jack Fisk Stand commemorates his involvement with the club.

== Professional career ==
He was a Company Executive. He was a partner in a clothing firm. He ran a local fleet of private buses in competition with London Transport.

== Political career ==

He was an early pioneer of Community Politics that became synonymous with Liberal success at local government level. He invented the 'Grumble Sheet' which encouraged public feedback. In 1957 he was elected as a Liberal for Manor ward in the elections to the Municipal Borough of Finchley. He was one of the two Liberals who made the initial breakththrough onto Finchley Council. In 1960 he was re-elected as a Liberal for Manor ward in the elections to the Municipal Borough of Finchley. In 1963 he was re-elected as a Liberal for Manor ward in the Finchley Borough Council elections, polling 52% of the vote. Following the 1963 Finchley elections, the Liberal Party won control of the council. Davis was elected as Mayor of Finchley and served a one year term. In 1964 he was elected as a Liberal for Finchley West in the inaugural Barnet London Borough Council election. In 1966 he was Liberal candidate for Finchley in the United Kingdom general election. He came third, polling 25% of the vote. In 1968 he was Liberal candidate in the Acton by-election. At the time, no election in the UK included the name of a candidate's party on the ballot paper. To get round this situation, he changed his name to 'Frank Liberal Davis'. He was in a six-way contest. He came third polling 11% of the vote. As a consequence of his name changing action, UK law was changed to allow party names on the ballot paper. In May 1968 he lost his seat on Barnet Council. He contested the re-drawn ward of Finchley and polled 36% of the vote. In 1982 he was an unsuccessful Liberal candidate for Friern Barnet at the Barnet Council elections, polling 25% of the vote.

=== Electoral record ===
1963 Finchley Borough Council; Manor
| Party | Candidate | Votes | % | ±% |
|---|---|---|---|---|
| Liberal | Frank Davis | 1,734 | 52.18 | |
| Conservative | S Stubbs | 1,117 | 33.61 | |
| Labour | P Watkins | 472 | 14.20 | |
| Majority | | 617 | 18.57 | |
| Turnout | | 3,323 | | |
| Liberal hold | | Swing | | |

1964 Barnet London Borough Council; Finchley West (3 seats)
| Party | Candidate | Votes | % | ±% |
|---|---|---|---|---|
| Liberal | J. Murray Medway | 3,184 | 46.7 | |
| Liberal | Leonard Sattin | 3,092 | | |
| Liberal | Frank Davis | 3,087 | | |
| Conservative | F. W. Riches | 2,840 | 41.6 | |
| Conservative | V. S. Francis | 2,771 | | |
| Conservative | C. E. White | 2,693 | | |
| Labour | R. Y. Green | 800 | 11.7 | |
| Labour | S. H. Harris | 795 | | |
| Labour | W. Meacock | 786 | | |
| Turnout | | 6,820 | 54.9 | |
| Liberal win (new seat) | | | | |

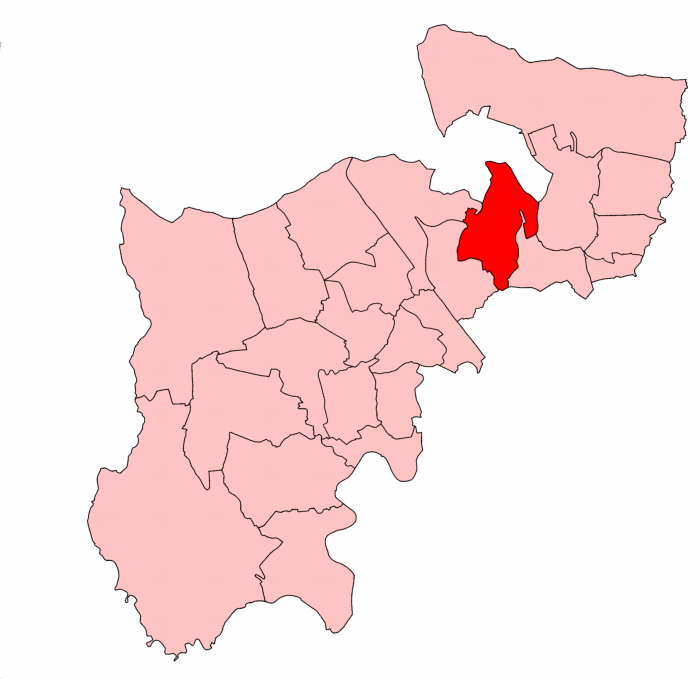
Finchley in Middlesex

General election 1966: Finchley
| Party | Candidate | Votes | % | ±% |
|---|---|---|---|---|
| Conservative | Margaret Thatcher | 23,968 | 46.5 | −0.1 |
| Labour | Yvonne Sieve | 14,504 | 28.1 | +4.6 |
| Liberal | Frank Davis | 13,070 | 25.4 | −4.5 |
| Majority | | 9,464 | 18.4 | +1.7 |
| Turnout | | 51,542 | 75.3 | −2.9 |
| Conservative hold | | Swing | −2.4 | |

Acton by-election, 1968
| Party | Candidate | Votes | % | ±% |
|---|---|---|---|---|
| Conservative | Kenneth Baker | 12,242 | 48.67 | +6.36 |
| Labour | Walter Johnson | 8,522 | 33.88 | −23.81 |
| Liberal | Frank Davis | 2,868 | 11.40 | n/a |
| National Front | Andrew Fountaine | 1,400 | 5.57 | n/a |
| Independent | Harold Fox | 75 | 0.30 | n/a |
| Independent | William Gold | 44 | 0.17 | n/a |
| Majority | | 3,720 | 14.79 | n/a |
| Turnout | | 25,151 | 59.7 | |
| Conservative gain from Labour | | Swing | | |

1982 Barnet London Borough Council; Friern Barnet (3 seats)
| Party | Candidate | Votes | % | ±% |
|---|---|---|---|---|
| Conservative | David C. Burton | 2,674 | | |
| Conservative | Frank D. Gibson | 2,627 | | |
| Conservative | John C. Tiplady | 2,590 | | |
| Alliance | Christopher Perkin | 1,213 | | |
| Alliance | Bruce A. Standing | 1,209 | | |
| Alliance | Frank Davis | 1,183 | | |
| Labour | Peter R. Butcher | 921 | | |
| Labour | Stephanie H.M. Dardis | 862 | | |
| Labour | Harry Kerens | 806 | | |
| Turnout | | | % | |
| Conservative hold | | Swing | | |

1990 Barnet London Borough Council; Garden Suburb (3 seats)
| Party | Candidate | Votes | % | ±% |
|---|---|---|---|---|
| Conservative | Frank Davis* | 2,948 | 60.1 | |
| Conservative | Roy Shutz* | 2,923 | 59.6 | |
| Conservative | Veronica Soskin* | 2,891 | 58.9 | |
| Liberal Democrats | Majorie Harris | 966 | 19.7 | |
| Liberal Democrats | Michael Pickering | 942 | 19.2 | |
| Liberal Democrats | Susette Palmer | 927 | 18.9 | |
| Labour | Penelope Grant | 569 | 11.6 | |
| Labour | Jula Westman | 567 | 11.6 | |
| Labour | Ephraim Lesser | 531 | 10.8 | |
| Green | Janet Strangeways | 479 | 9.8 | |
| Turnout | | | | |
| Conservative hold | | Swing | | |

1994 Barnet London Borough Council; Garden Suburb (3 seats)
| Party | Candidate | Votes | % | ±% |
|---|---|---|---|---|
| Conservative | Frank Davis* | 1,748 | 42.6 | −17.5 |
| Conservative | Roy Shutz* | 1,724 | 42.0 | −17.6 |
| Conservative | Mohammed Khamisa* | 1,665 | 40.5 | −18.4 |
| Liberal Democrats | Majorie Harris | 1,645 | 40.1 | +20.4 |
| Liberal Democrats | Millicent Watkins | 1,552 | 37.8 | +18.6 |
| Liberal Democrats | David Ive | 1,520 | 37.0 | +18.1 |
| Labour | Naomi Angell | 668 | 16.3 | +4.7 |
| Labour | Jula Westman | 648 | 15.8 | +4.2 |
| Labour | Carol Kohll | 634 | 15.4 | +4.6 |
| Turnout | | | | |
| Conservative hold | | Swing | | |
