= Dollis Brook Viaduct =

Railway viaduct in Finchley, London

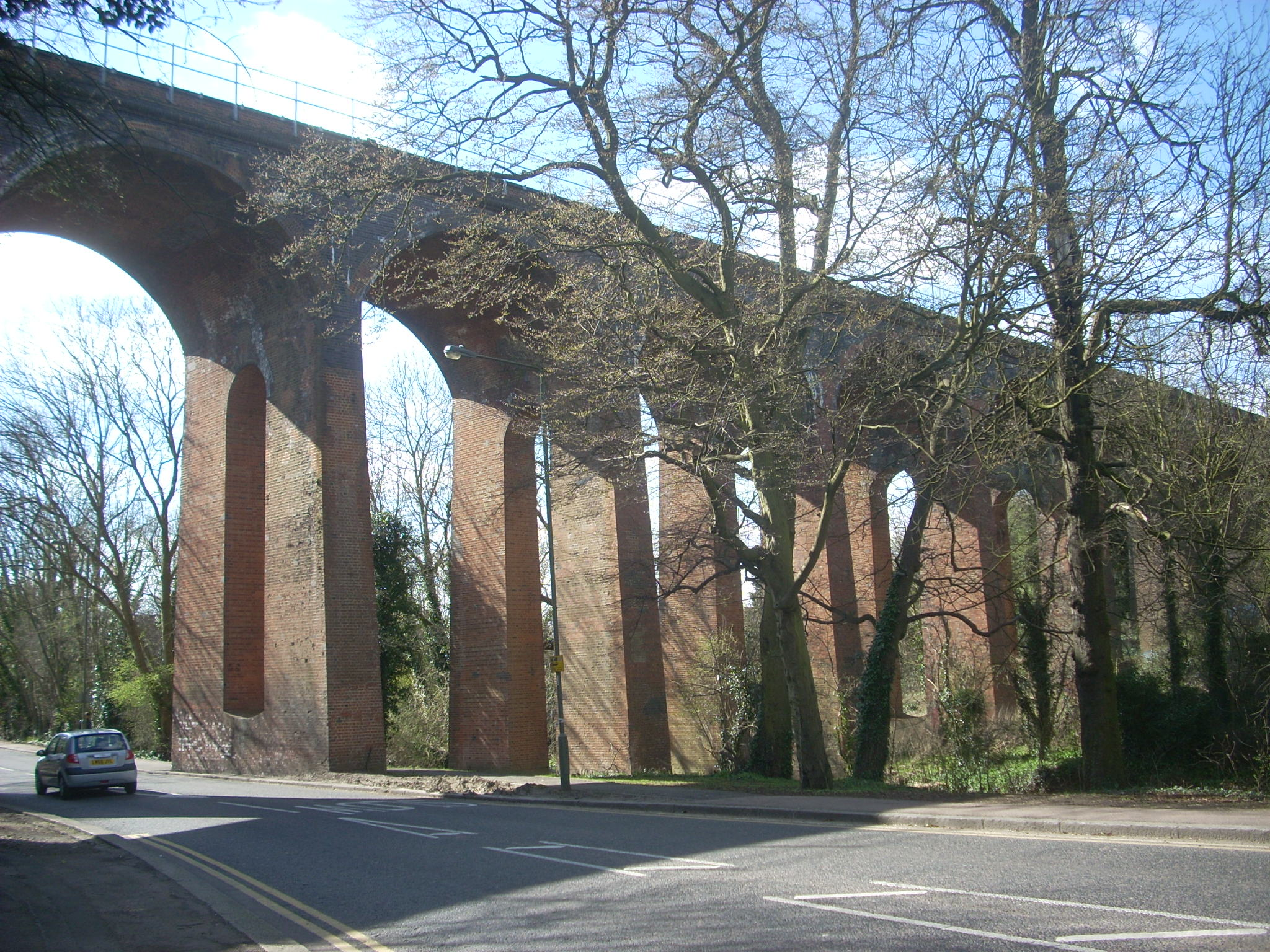
- The Dollis Brook Viaduct
- Coordinates: 51.6051°N 0.2022°W
- Carries: London Underground Northern line
- Crosses: Dollis Road, Dollis Brook
- Locale: Finchley, London
- Official name: Dollis Brook Viaduct, Dollis Road Viaduct, Mill Hill Viaduct

Characteristics
- Design: Viaduct
- Material: Brick
- Total length: 13 arches of 32 feet (9.8 m) span each
- Height: 60 feet (18 m)
- No. of spans: 13

History
- Designer: John Fowler, Walter Brydone
- Construction start: 1863
- Construction end: 1867
- Opened: 22 August 1867

The Dollis Brook Viaduct, also known as the Dollis Road Viaduct, Dollis Viaduct or Mill Hill Viaduct, is a railway viaduct to the west of Finchley, North London, United Kingdom. It carries the London Underground's Northern line from Mill Hill East station to Finchley Central station. It is the highest point on the London Underground above ground level, reaching nearly 60 feet (18 m). It is located on a branch that was formerly part of the Edgware, Highgate and London Railway.

== Etymology ==
The official name of the viaduct is taken from Dollis Brook which it crosses. The brook was marked on an 1877 Ordnance Survey map and the name may have originated from a farm called Dollis, previously in Hendon. This was earlier named Dalys in 1563, (the) Doles 1574, Dallys 1584 and in its current form of Dollis in 1822. This probably meant "the portions or shares of land (in the common field)", from the Middle English word dole.

The name is not thought to be connected with the area of Dollis Hill, further south. Dollis Hill is thought to mean a "hill associated with a family called Dalley".

== History ==
The viaduct was designed by John Fowler and Walter Brydone, chief engineer for the Great Northern Railway (GNR) from 1855 to 1861. The contractor that built the bridge was Smith, Knight & Co. The viaduct came into use on 22 August 1867 with the opening of the GNR's single-track Edgware, Highgate and London Railway line from Finsbury Park to Edgware, via Finchley and Mill Hill, which was authorised by an Act of Parliament in 1862.

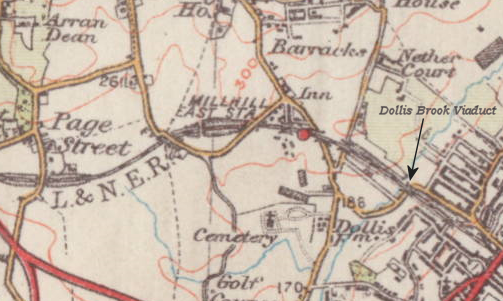
1934 Ordnance Survey map with the location of the viaduct marked

Although built to carry two tracks, the viaduct initially carried only one. Following the construction of a branch northwards from Finchley to Barnet in 1872, the original Edgware route effectively became a branch of the newer line. In the 1920s, the London and North Eastern Railway (LNER, successor to the GNR) planned to electrify the line but work was not carried out until the 1930s when the Northern Heights plan led to the doubling and electrification of the lines. This was in preparation for a transfer of the lines to the London Underground for it to form part of the system's Northern line.

The start of the Second World War prevented the plans being completed and only the section of the line to Mill Hill East was electrified and reopened in 1941, whilst the High Barnet branch was electrified in 1940. From this point on London Transport trains used only one of the tracks on the Mill Hill branch and the other track was soon lifted. Freight on the line lasted until 1964 when the line west of Mill Hill East was abandoned, leaving the present arrangement.

== Length, span and architecture ==
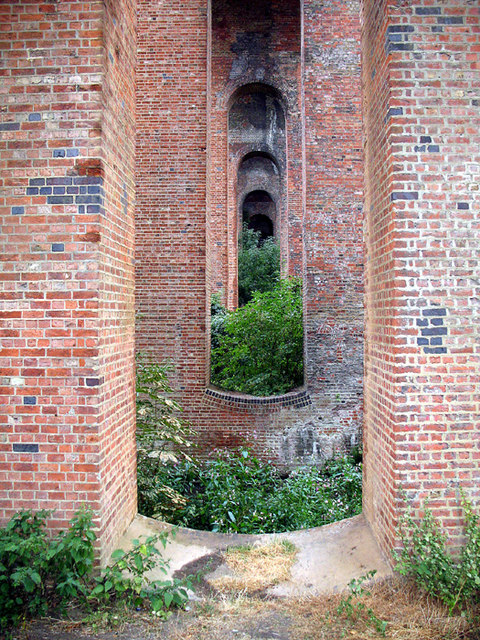
Detailed view of viaduct's piers

The viaduct's 13 segmental arches carry it across the valley of the Dollis Brook, and over Dollis Road. Each arch spans 32 feet (9.8 m) at the springer level, and is based on tapered piers. In each pier there is an opening with an arched soffit and a dished invert. The viaduct is made from brick. It is the highest point on both the Northern line and the highest point on the London Underground above ground level, reaching nearly 60 feet (18 m). It is not, however, the highest altitude on the Underground system, which is near Amersham (Metropolitan line) in the Chiltern Hills, at 150 metres (490 ft) above sea level.

== Around the viaduct ==
Below the viaduct can be found the Dollis Valley Greenwalk, a long-distance footpath between Moat Mount Open Space in Mill Hill and Hampstead Heath. This is designed to link many green spaces and wildlife corridors along the way and is approximately 10 miles (16 km) long. The geology nearby is of London Clay with small amounts of other rock types.

An examination in the late 19th century of the railway cutting between Finchley and Hendon station found a large extent of glacial beds and fossils, and these were thought to extend as far northwest as the viaduct.

== See also ==
- List of bridges in London
