= Dollis Brook =

River in London, England

Coordinates: 51.5717°N 0.2361°W

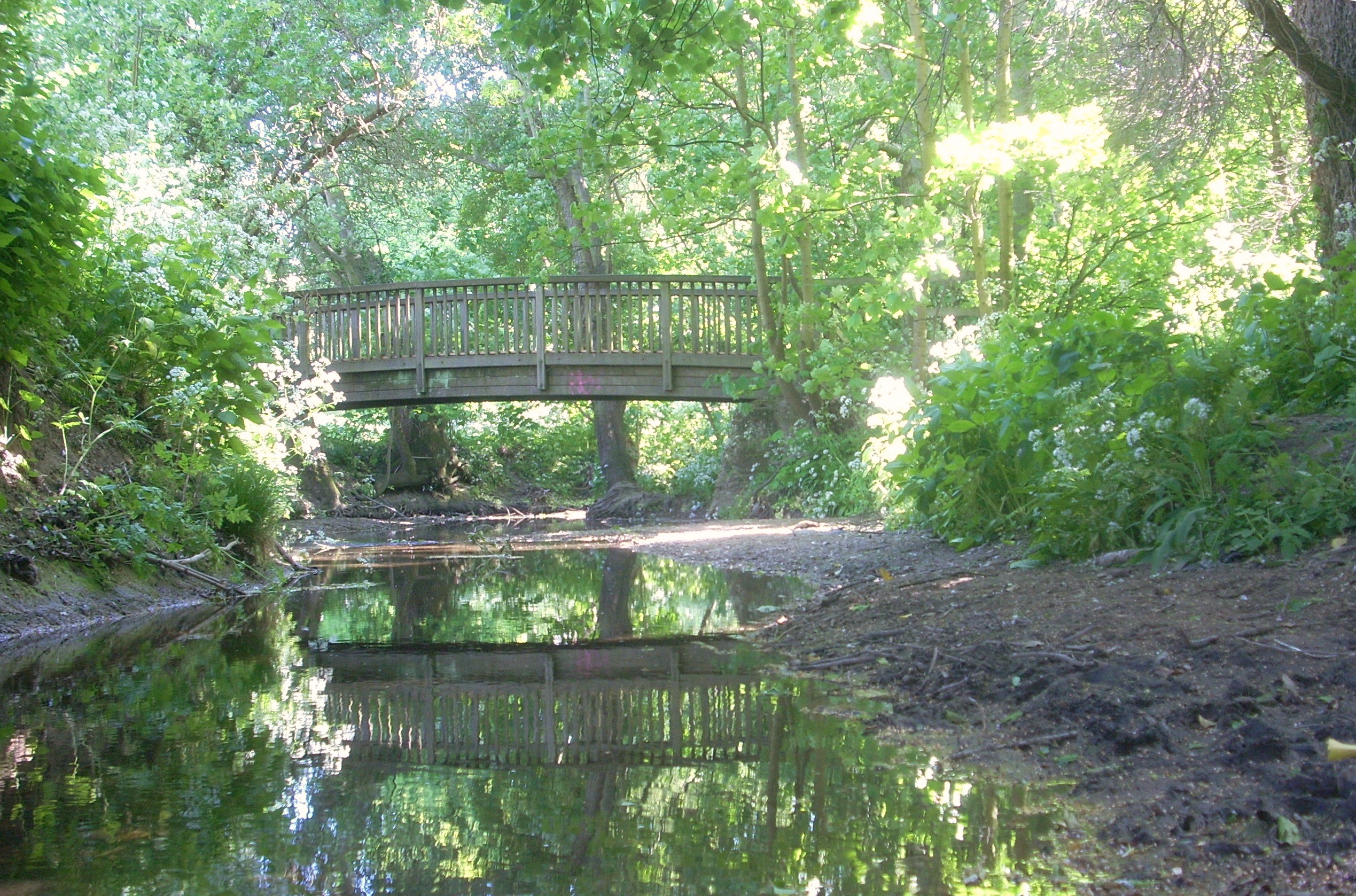
- A footbridge over Dollis Brook in Windsor Open Space, Finchley

Physical characteristics
- Mouth: River Brent
  - location: Hendon

Dollis Brook is a waterway which runs through Barnet in north London. It is a tributary of the River Brent, which is itself a tributary of the River Thames.

The Dollis Valley Greenwalk follows almost all of Dollis Brook, apart from a short section at the beginning which passes through private land, and the London Loop follows it as far as Barnet Lane. The name Dollis is probably derived from the Middle English word 'dole', meaning the shares of land in the common field.

== Course ==
Course of the Dollis Brook

Dollis Brook rises at two points, one on Mote End Farm and the other on the London Loop and Dollis Valley Greenwalk at TQ 21714 94551 – the latter only has water after heavy rain. The brook then flows through private land under Hendon Wood Lane. Its course is eastwards through Totteridge Fields, a Site of Metropolitan Importance, and then through fields and open spaces to King George V Playing Fields in Totteridge.

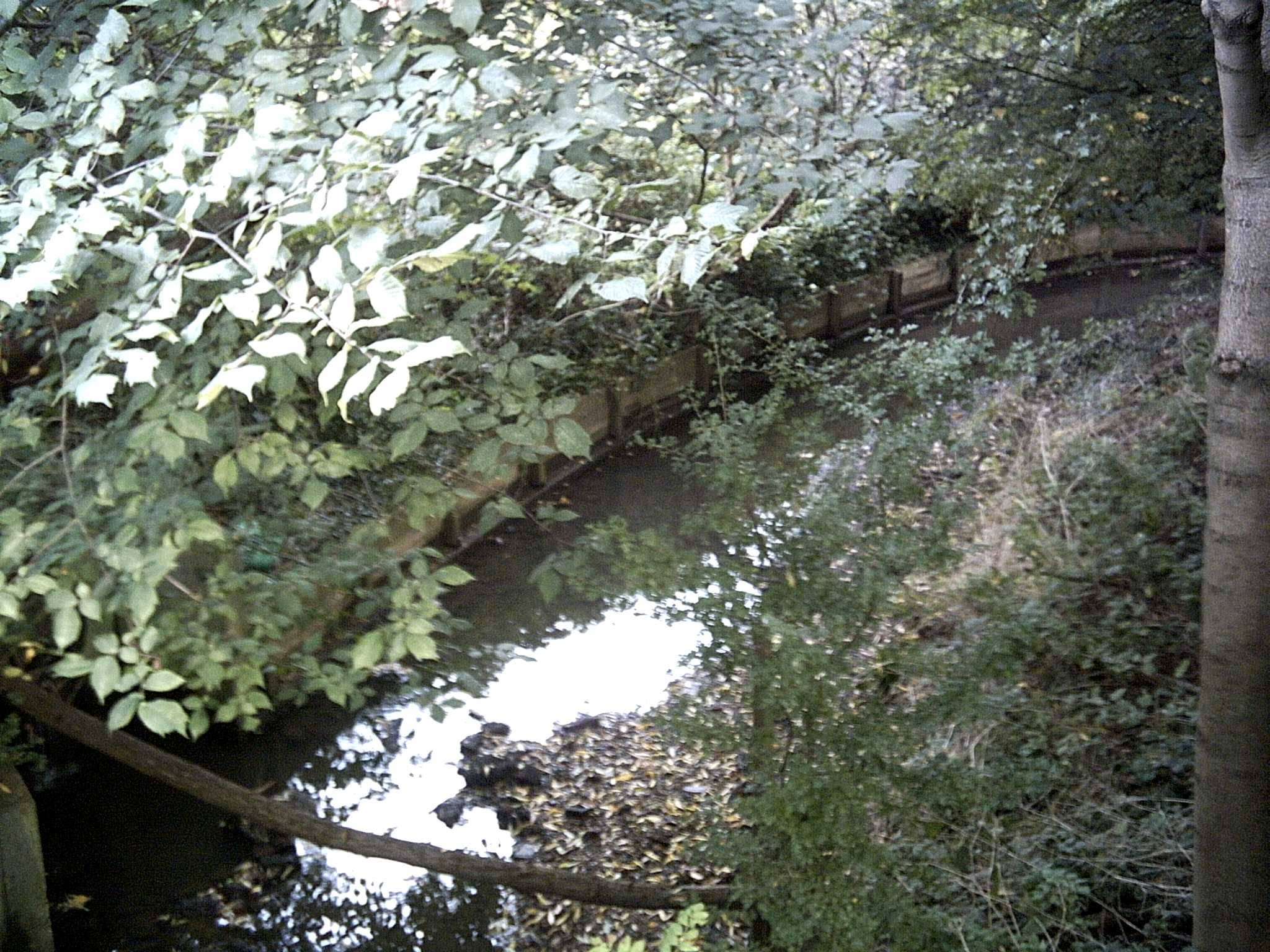
Dollis Brook, looking south from Totteridge Lane

The brook then turns southwards and forms the eastern boundary of Totteridge. It passes through Wyatts Farm Open Space and Brook Farm Open Space to Totteridge Lane near Totteridge and Whetstone Underground station, and then continues south through Woodside Park (where it merges with Folly Brook) and West Finchley, before passing under the Dollis Brook Viaduct which carries the Northern line between Finchley Central and Mill Hill East Underground stations. Until 1965 Dollis Brook formed the boundary between the municipal boroughs of Finchley and Hendon.

Dollis Brook then passes under Dollis Road and through Windsor Open Space to the Great North Way (A1). Near Bridge Lane in Hendon it merges with Mutton Brook to form the River Brent.

== Nature ==
Upper Dollis Brook between Mill Hill and Woodside Park, including neighbouring open spaces, is a Site of Borough Importance for Nature Conservation, Grade I. It is too shaded for aquatic plants, but plants such as yellow iris and water-pepper grow along its banks and kingfishers, grey wagtails, and moorhens can be seen along the stream.

Lower Dollis Brook is a Site of Borough Importance for Nature Conservation, Grade II. It starts at Woodside Park and includes Brent Park and the River Brent until it passes under the Northern line near Brent Cross Flyover. It is less ecologically rich than Upper Dollis Brook, but nevertheless forms a valuable green corridor through suburban areas.

== See also ==
- Nature reserves in Barnet
