= Barnet Gate Wood =

Public open space in Barnet, London, England

Coordinates: 51.6389°N 0.2447°W

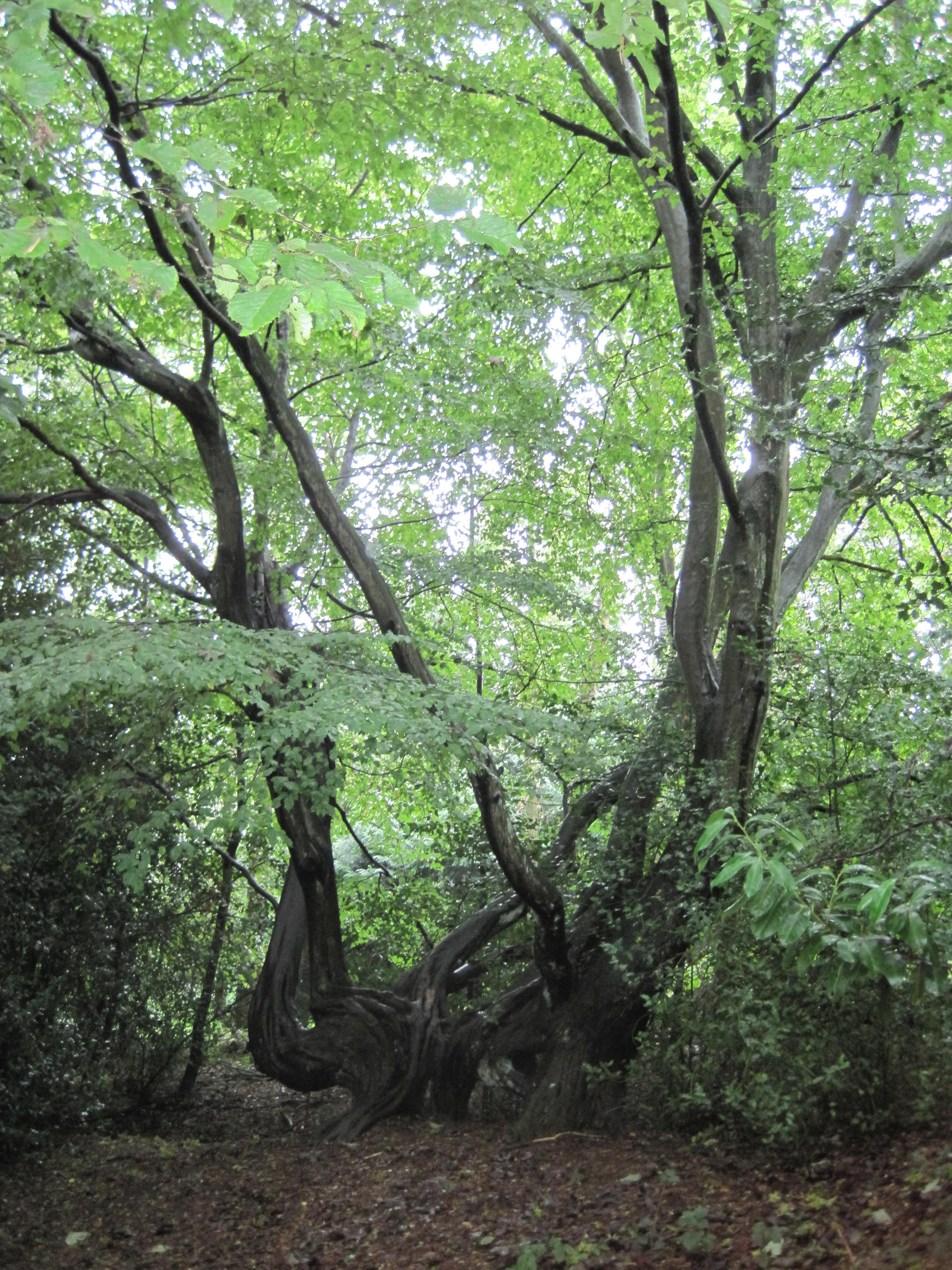
Hornbeam in Barnet Gate Wood planted about 1940

Barnet Gate Wood is a public open space in Barnet Gate, Barnet, London. It is owned and managed by the London Borough of Barnet, and is part of the Watling Chase Community Forest.

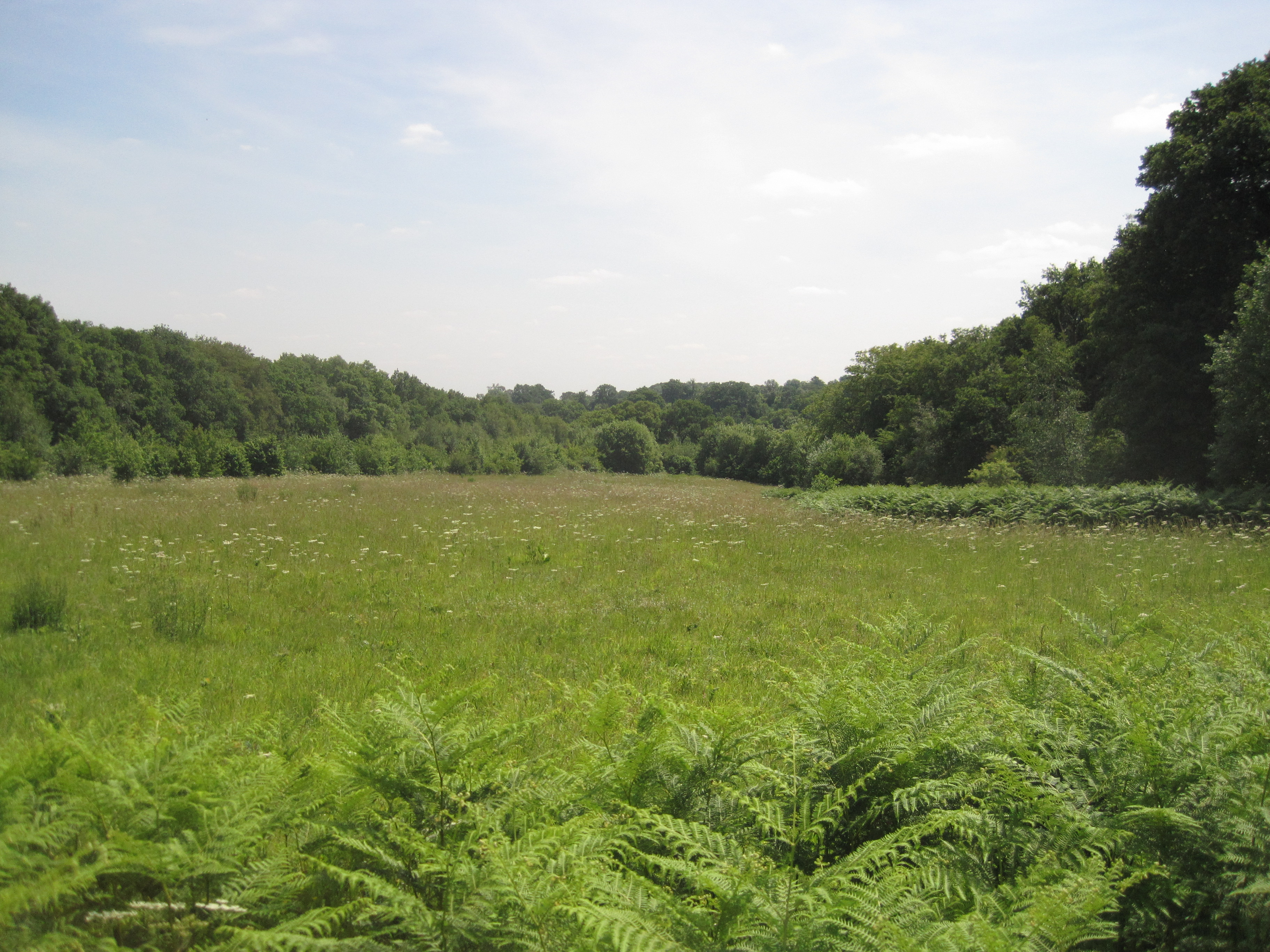
Clearing in Barnet Gate Wood

It is a small ancient wood, with a canopy of oak and hornbeam, and an understorey dominated by rhododendron. Some of the hornbeam are in strange shapes as they were originally trained as hedges and then allowed go wild.

The entrance is by a path from Hendon Wood Lane, near the junction with Barnet Road. There is also access from the Dollis Valley Greenwalk and London Loop, at wooden posts numbered 12 and 13, which are points on the Barnet Gate Wood Nature Trail.

Barnet Gate Wood is part of Moat Mount Open Space and Mote End Farm, a Site of Borough Importance for Nature Conservation, Borough Grade II.

== See also ==
- Nature reserves in Barnet
