= 1963 Finchley Borough Council election =

- 10 May 1963

8 councillors to Finchley Borough Council
	First party	Second party	Third party
Party	Liberal	Conservative	Labour
Seats won			0
Seat change	▲	▼	▼1
Majority party before election
Conservative Party
Majority party after election
Liberal Party

Finchley's 1963 municipal elections were held on 10 May 1963. One-third of the seats represented by councillors were up for election. One seat fell vacant in each of the eight wards.

== Background ==
Finchley Council was made up of 32 elected members: 24 Councillors elected by the voting public and 8 Aldermen elected by the Councillors. Councillors served a three-year term, while Aldermen served a six-year term. Since the council was enlarged in 1950, the Conservative Party had been in power. After the 1962 elections, the Liberals had the most Councillors. However, the Conservatives retained power as they had more Aldermen.

== Election result ==
Finchley local election result 1963
Party	Seats	Gains	Losses	Net gain/loss	Seats %	Votes %	Votes	+/−
Liberal			0		66.66	52.52	13,694	+20.73
Conservative		0			33.33	37.93	9,891	-18.06
Labour	0	0	1	-1	0.0	9.55	2,491	-2.66

The result had the following consequences for the total number of seats on the council after the elections:

Party	Previous council		New council	
Party	Cllr	Ald	Cllr	Ald
Liberals		0	19	-
Conservative		8	5	-
Labour		-		-
Total	24	8	24	8
Total	32		32	

The Conservatives lost their majority and went into opposition. The Liberals won a majority taking control of the council for the first time.

== Ward results ==
Bishop's
Party	Candidate	Votes	%	±%
Liberal	Alan D Cohen	1,639	52.73	
Conservative	M Mendel	1,178	37.89	
Labour	Yvonne Sieve	292	9.39	
Majority		461	14.84	
Turnout		3,109		
Liberal hold		Swing		

Glebe
Party	Candidate	Votes	%	±%
Liberal				
Conservative				
Labour				
Majority				
Turnout				
Liberal gain from Conservative		Swing		

Manor
Party	Candidate	Votes	%	±%
Liberal	Frank Davis	1,734	52.18	
Conservative	S Stubbs	1,117	33.61	
Labour	P Watkins	472	14.20	
Majority		617	18.57	
Turnout		3,323		
Liberal hold		Swing		

Moss Hall
Party	Candidate	Votes	%	±%
Liberal				
Conservative				
Labour				
Majority				
Turnout				
Liberal gain from Conservative		Swing		

St Mary's
Party	Candidate	Votes	%	±%
Conservative				
Liberal				
Labour				
Majority				
Turnout				
Conservative hold		Swing		

St Paul's
Party	Candidate	Votes	%	±%
Liberal				
Conservative				
Labour				
Majority				
Turnout				
Liberal hold		Swing		

Tudor
Party	Candidate	Votes	%	±%
Liberal	M Lowe	1,270	41.19	
Labour	RN Chesterton	1,190	38.60	
Conservative	V Francis	623	20.21	
Majority		80	2.59	
Turnout		3,083		
Liberal gain from Labour		Swing		

Whetstone
Party	Candidate	Votes	%	±%
Conservative				
Liberal				
Labour				
Majority				
Turnout				
Conservative hold		Swing		
