= Moat Mount Open Space =

Park and nature reserve in London

Coordinates: 51.6338°N 0.2526°W

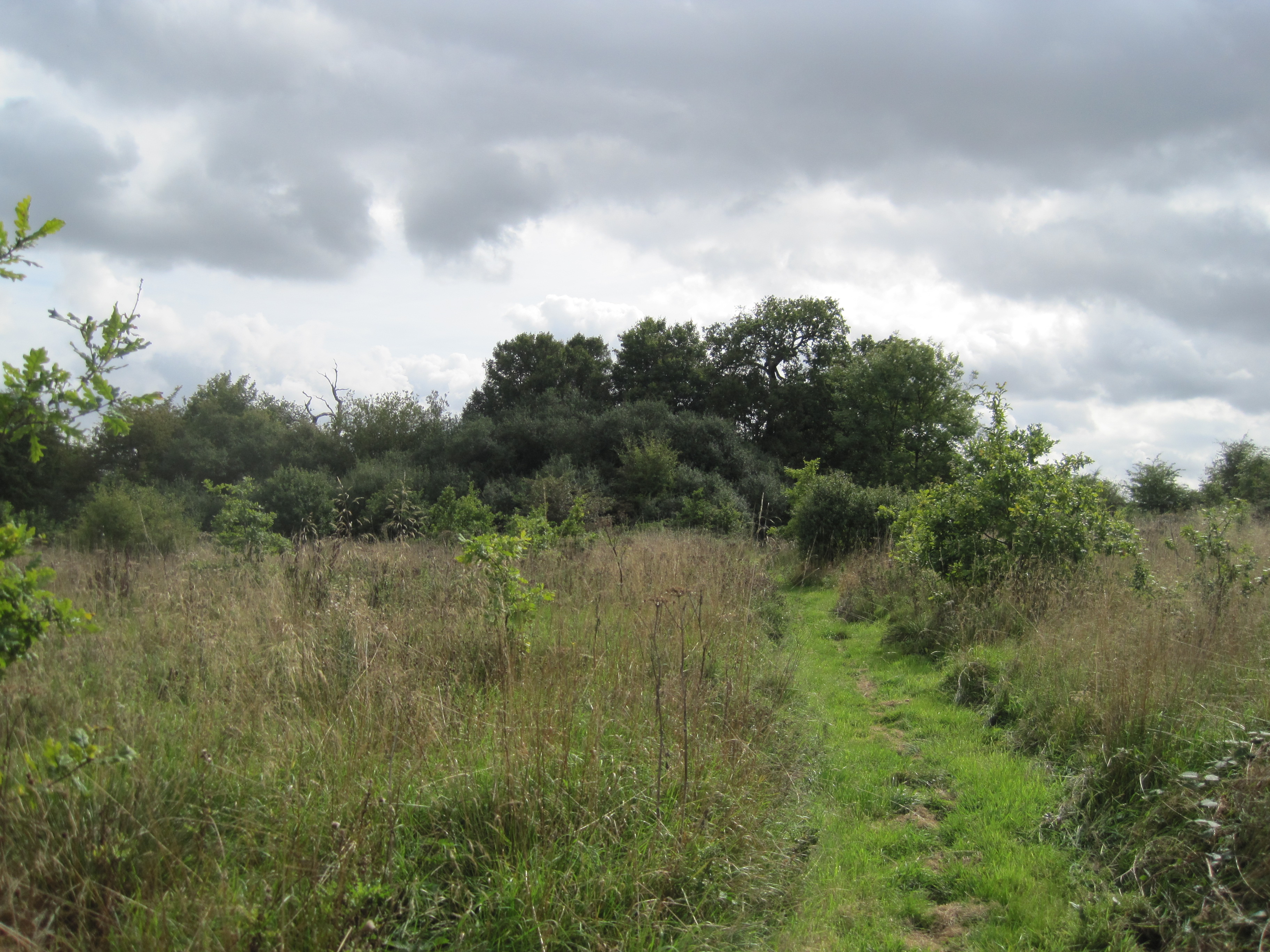
Moat Mount near Barnet Road

Moat Mount Open Space is a 110-hectare park and nature reserve in Mill Hill in the London Borough of Barnet. It is part of Moat Mount Open Space and Mote End Farm Site of Borough Importance for Nature Conservation, Grade II, which includes Barnet Gate Wood and Scratchwood Countryside Park, but is separate from Scratchwood itself, which is a neighbouring park and nature reserve. Most of the site is open to the public, but Mote End Farm and some other areas are private. Scratchwood and Moat Mount are a Local Nature Reserve.

== The site ==
Moat Mount is a large, hilly open space with extensive views from the top of the hill. Most of it lies over London Clay. Much of the Countryside Park is grassland, which has a diversity of wild flowers and many butterflies. The Park also has Leg of Mutton pond and several small woods, such as Target Wood and Nut Wood. Moat Mount also includes Moat Mount Outdoor Centre and Campsite, which has a range of activities for local schools and youth organisations. The Dollis Brook rises on Mote End Farm.

The site was once owned by Irwin Cox, the Conservative MP for Harrow from 1899 to 1906.

== Access ==
The main entrance to the site is the permanently closed Moat Mount car park in the Countryside Park on the southbound lane of Barnet Way, a dual carriageway section of the A1, between Stirling Corner and Apex Corner. There are also entrances to the reserve from the back of Mill Hill County High School, Barnet Road (near Stirling Corner), from Hendon Wood Lane along the route of the Greenwalk and the Loop, and from Bedford Road. The Dollis Valley Greenwalk starts at the car park, and the London Loop goes through the reserve. Scratchwood is on the other side of Barnet Way, with access by an underpass at Courtland Avenue.

== Bruno's Field ==
Bruno's Field is a Site of Borough Importance for Nature Conservation, Grade II, at Grid Ref TQ215 934, south of Moat Mount between Worcester Crescent and Marsh Lane. In the mid nineteenth century the field was part of the park of Highfield House, which was then owned by Lady Raffles, the widow of Stamford Raffles. Most of it is now used as pasture for cattle from the Royal Veterinary College. It has a varied topography with a pond and small streams in boggy areas, while grass areas have typical pasture herbs. Some of the oldest oaks mark eighteenth century field boundaries. The field is private land and there is no public access.

== Gallery ==
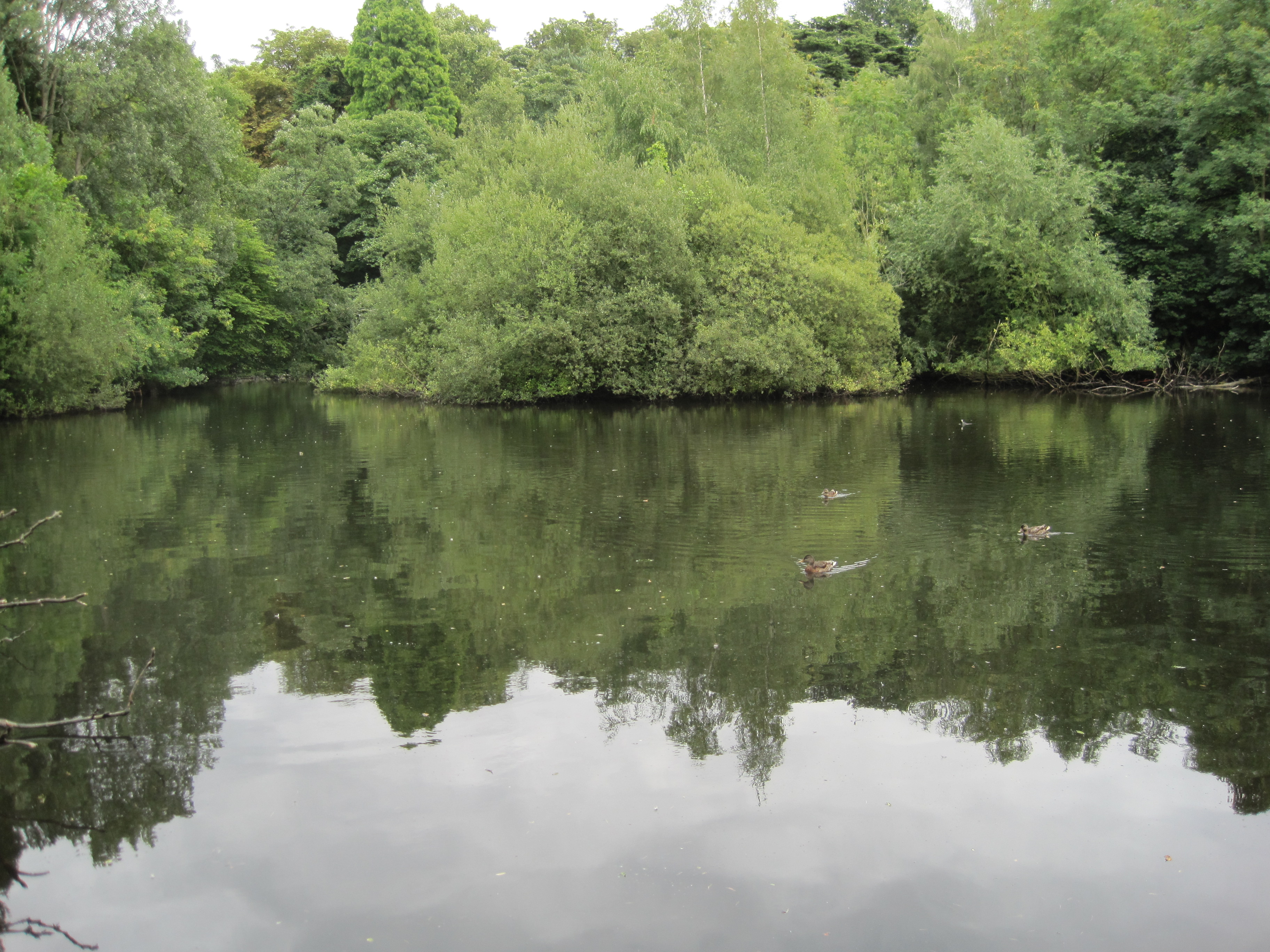
Leg of Mutton Pond

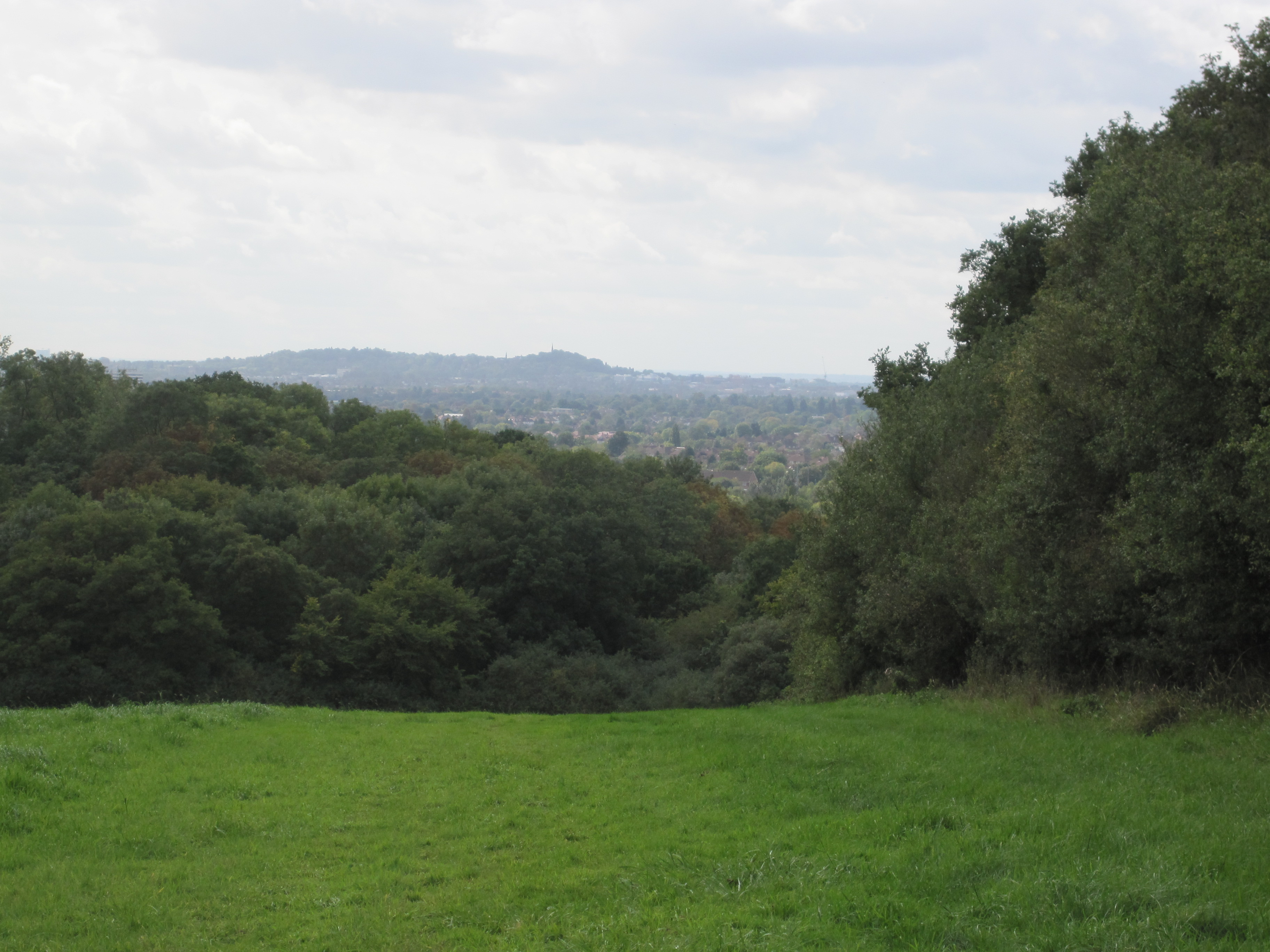
View from footpath to Barnet Road

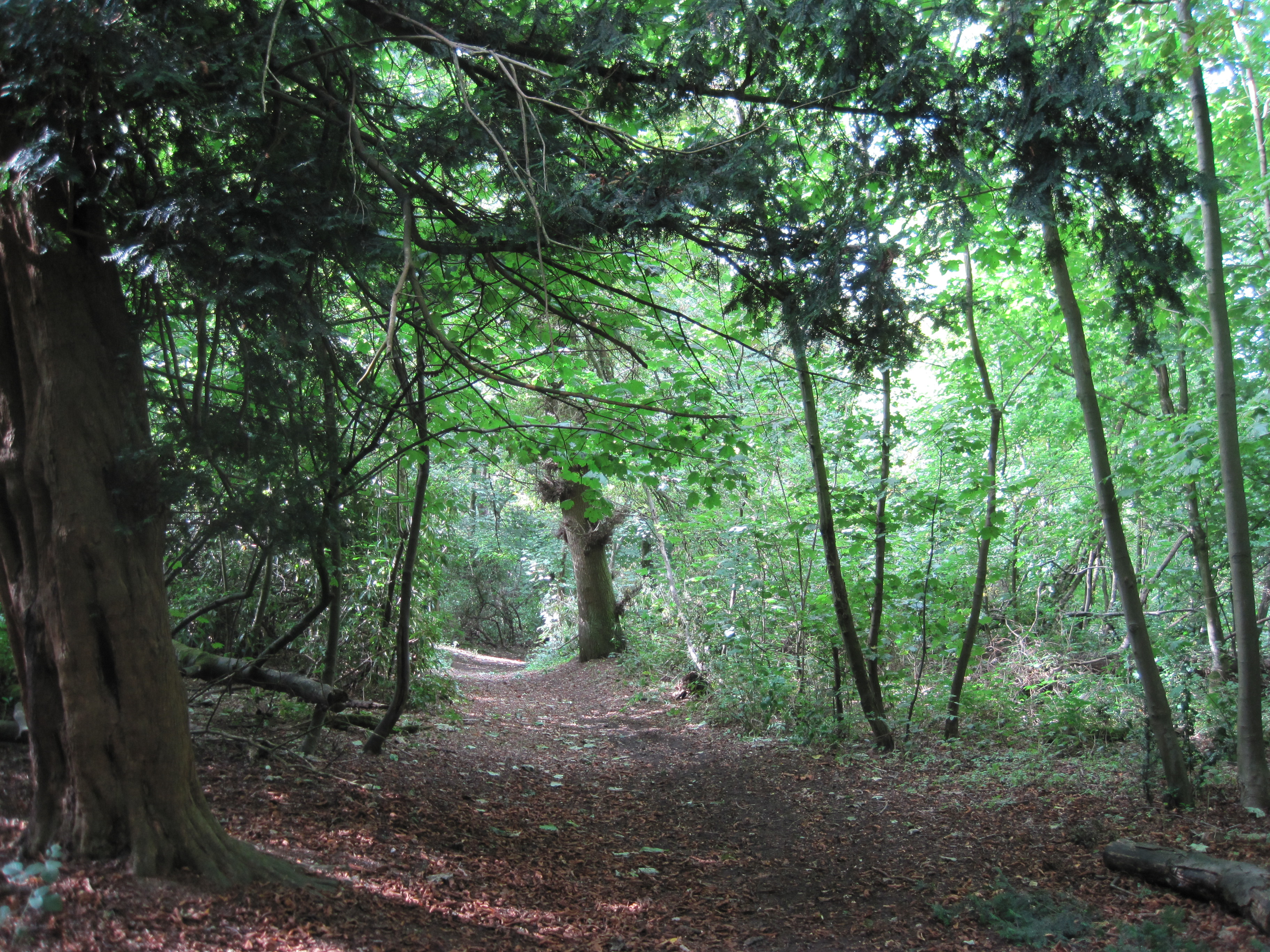
Nut Wood near Leg of Mutton Pond

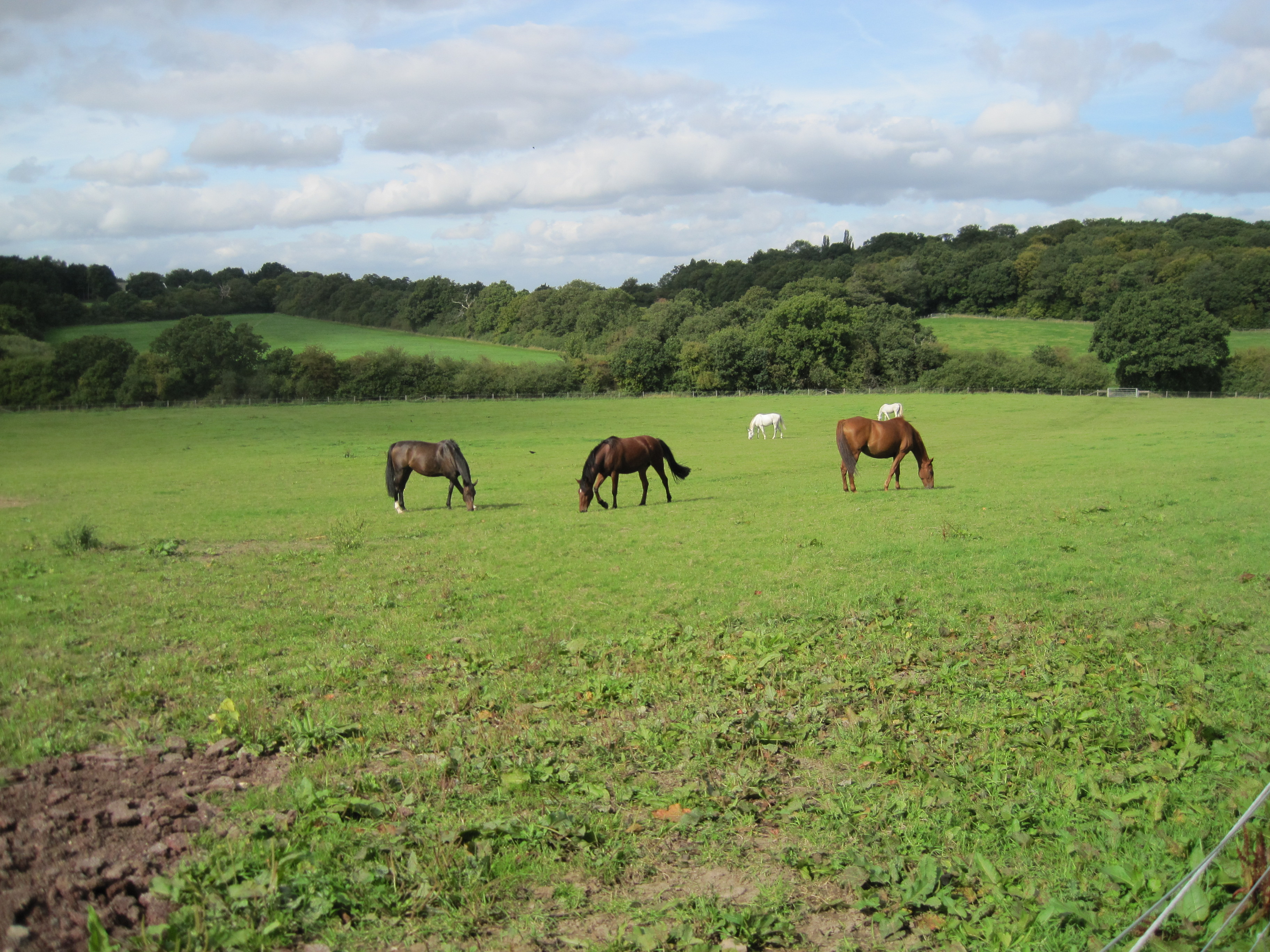
Fields on Mote End Farm are used to keep horses for its livery stables

== See also ==
- Barnet parks and open spaces
- Nature reserves in Barnet
