= Totteridge Fields =

Nature reserve near London, England

- IUCN category IV (habitat/species management area)
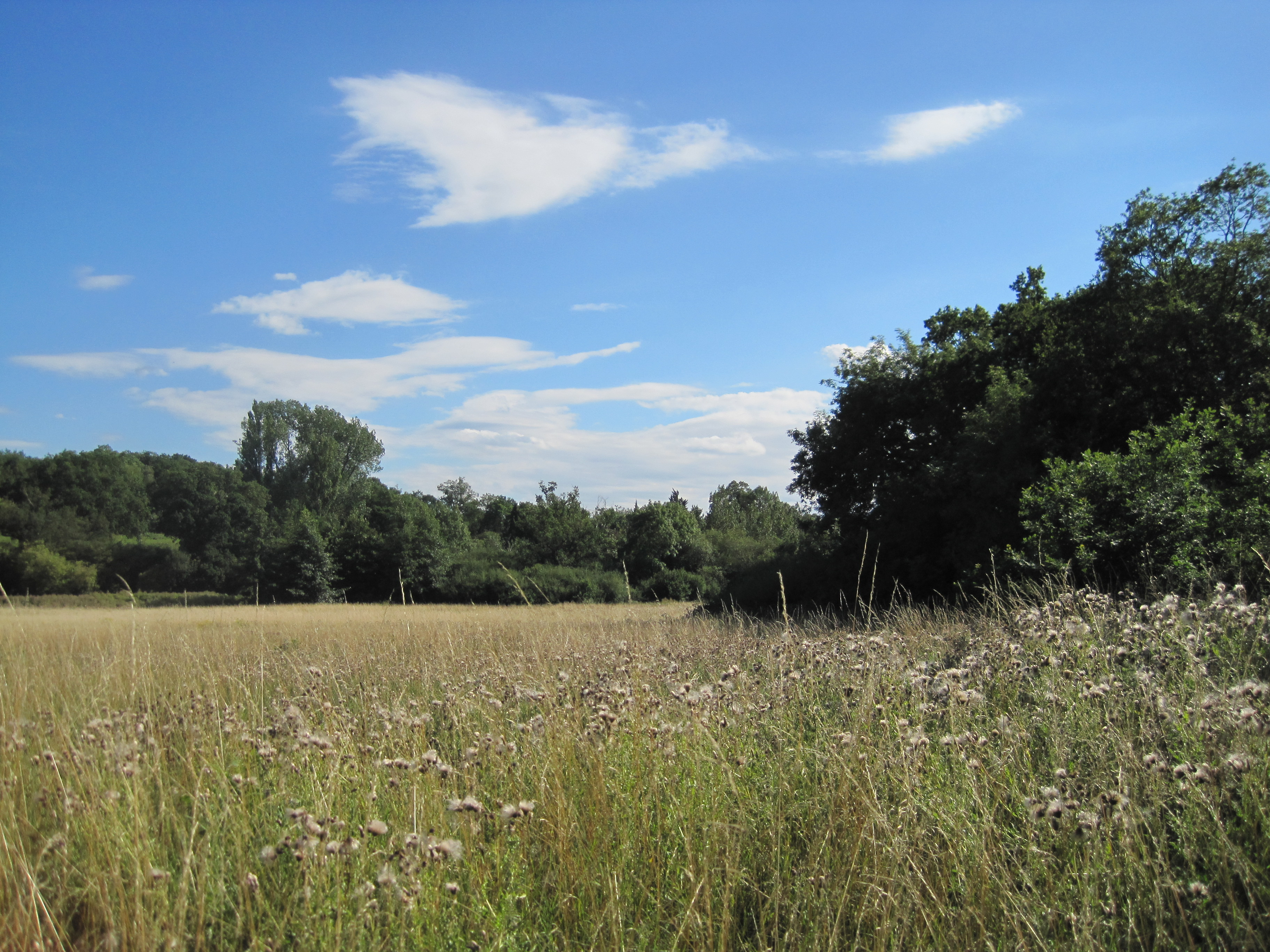
- Interactive map of Totteridge Fields
- Location: Barnet
- Nearest city: London, England
- Coordinates: 51°37′55.7″N 0°14′3.5″W
- Area: 6.9 hectares (17 acres)
- Governing body: London Wildlife Trust
- Website: www.wildlondon.org.uk/reserves/totteridge-fields

Totteridge Fields is a 97-hectare Site of Metropolitan Importance for Nature Conservation (SINC) in Totteridge in the London Borough of Barnet. The SINC includes the privately owned Highwood Hill, and at the western end is a seven-hectare Local Nature Reserve owned by Barnet Council and managed by the London Wildlife Trust.

The Local Nature Reserve is an ancient hay meadow habitat consisting of three fields, known as Nutt Field, Hen Mead and Nearer Slay Land, with hawthorn and blackthorn hedgerows. The entrance is on Hendon Wood Lane, Arkley.

The main part of the site consists of a large area of uncultivated grassland and old hedgerows between Totteridge Common and Mays Lane, crossing Dollis Brook, which is also an SINC. The grassland has a wide range of wildflowers, such as sneezewort and harebell. The site also hosts the declining skylark and several rare beetles and spiders.

The Dollis Valley Greenwalk and London Loop cross Totteridge Fields.

== See also ==
- Nature reserves in Barnet
