= Scratchwood =

Country park in the London Borough of Barnet, England

Coordinates: 51.640°N 0.264°W

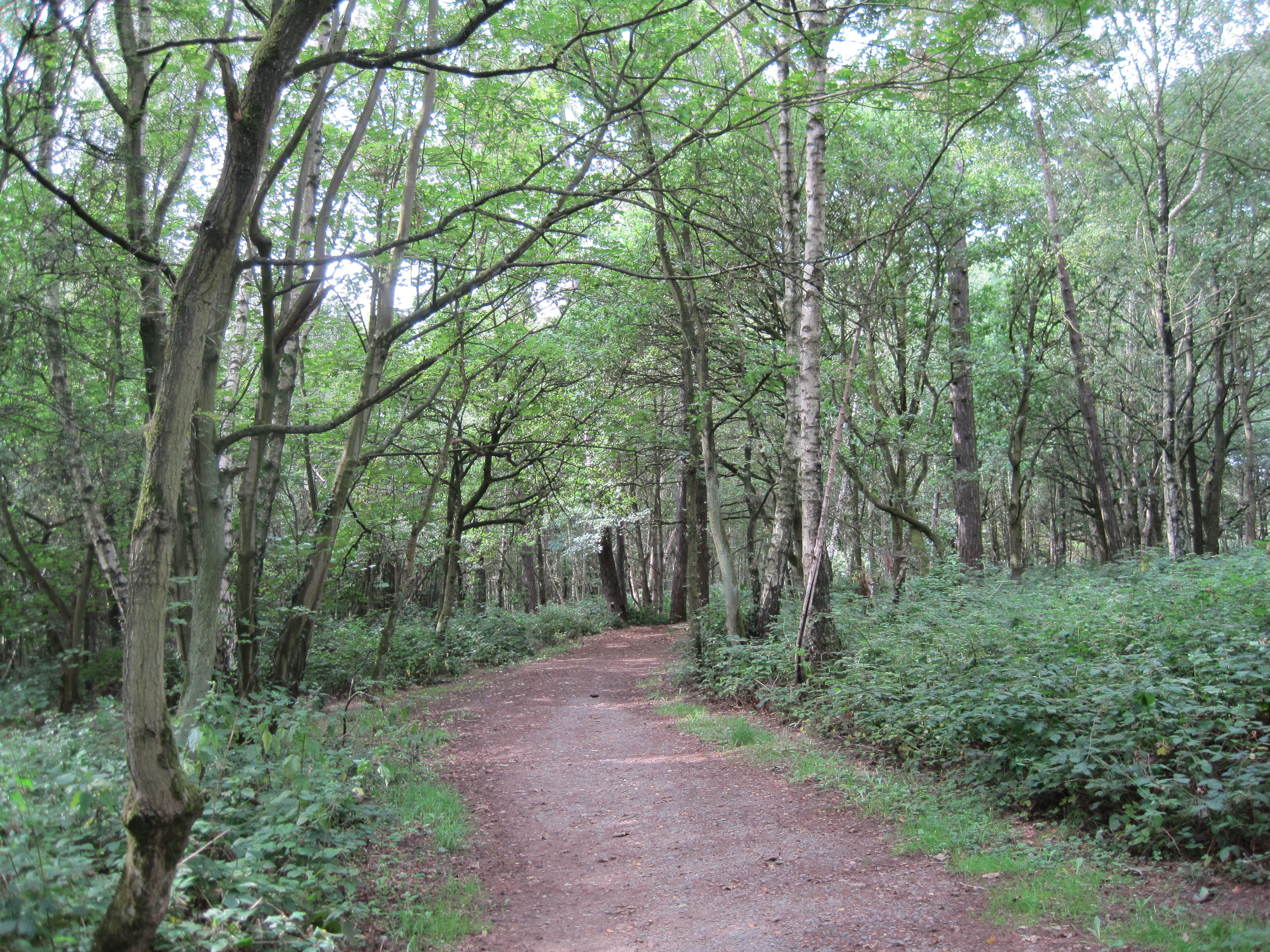
Path in Scratchwood

Scratchwood is an extensive, mainly wooded, country park in Mill Hill in the London Borough of Barnet. The 57-hectare site is a Site of Metropolitan Importance for Nature Conservation and together with the neighbouring Moat Mount Open Space. It is a Local Nature Reserve.

== History and ecology ==
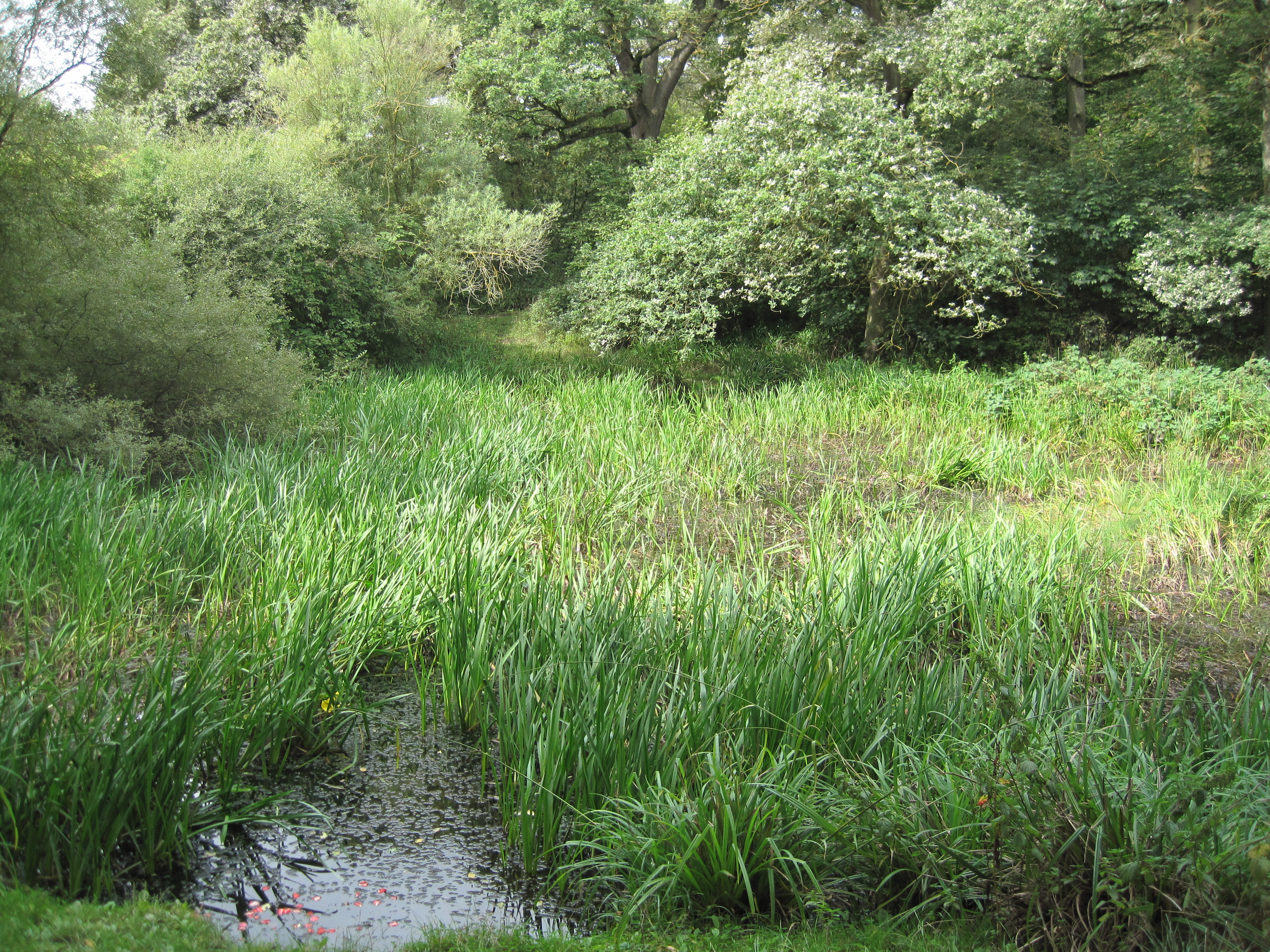
Overgrown pond at Scratchwood

Scratchwood is a remnant of the once great Middlesex Forest, and has the largest area of ancient woodland which survives in Barnet. Parts of it may go back to the woods which grew up after the end of the last ice age, the Younger Dryas, 11,500 years ago. The ancient woodland consists mainly of sessile oak and hornbeam, with some wild service trees, while secondary woodland areas are mainly birch, hawthorns and sycamore. In the view of the London Ecology Unit, "Scratchwood is the Borough's best woodland in terms of floral diversity, especially of ancient woodland indicator species". The herb rich grassland and the pond have a number of rare plants. Breeding birds include nuthatch, lesser whitethroat and cuckoo.

The area of Scratchwood south of the entrance was once hay meadows, growing food for London's vast horse population, but in 1866 Scratchwood and Moat Mount were part of a 400-hectare estate which was purchased by Edward William Cox, and Scratchwood was then used for sport and rearing game. The areas which are now nature reserves were purchased by Hendon Urban District Council in 1923.

The main entrance is by the car park, which is accessed from the northbound lane of Barnet Way, a dual carriageway which is part of the A1 road, near Stirling Corner. There is also access by a footpath from Barnet Lane in Elstree. The London Loop crosses the reserve.

In December 2019 a murder victim was found inside a car which was parked next to the Scratchwood area.

== Mill Hill Golf Course ==
Mill Hill Golf Course is a 60-hectare Site of Borough Importance for Nature Conservation, Grade I, immediately south of Scratchwood at Grid Ref TQ206 942. 150 years ago it was farmland, and it later became part of a country estate which included Scratchwood and Moat Mount. The golf course was created in 1927.

The most important feature of the site is its rich birdlife, including the rare willow tit. Deans Brook rises on the course, and a number of small streams converge towards Stoneyfields Lake, created by damming the brook when the site was a country estate. The lake and streams support many species of water loving plants. The area close to Scratchwood is acid grassland which has uncommon species such as dyer's greenweed and heath speedwell. There are some larger areas of woodland, such as Hemmings Wood at the southern end of the course.

== See also ==
- Barnet parks and open spaces
- Nature reserves in Barnet
