= Municipal Borough of Finchley =

Former local authority in England

Coordinates: 51.60°N 0.18°W

Finchley
- Finchley within Middlesex in 1961
- Area
  - 1901: 3,384 acres (13.7 km^{2})
  - 1961: 3,477 acres (14.1 km^{2})
- Population
  - 1901: 22,126
  - 1961: 69,370
- History
  - Created: 1878
  - Abolished: 1965
  - Succeeded by: London Borough of Barnet
- Status: Local Government District (1878-1895); Urban district (1895 - 1933); Municipal borough (1933 - 1965)
- Government: Finchley Local Board; Finchley Urban District Council; Finchley Borough Council
  - HQ: Finchley
  - Motto: Regnant Qui Serviunt (They rule who serve)
- Coat of arms of Finchley Borough Council

Finchley, which is now in north London, was a local government district in Middlesex, England, from 1878 to 1965. Finchley Local Board first met in 1878. It became Finchley Urban District Council in 1895 and the Municipal Borough of Finchley in 1933. In 1965 Middlesex was abolished and Finchley became part of the London Borough of Barnet.

== Formation ==
The parish of Finchley had no local government in the modern sense until the 19th century. The parish initially resisted adopting the Local Government Act 1858 and forming a local board to govern the town on grounds of cost. However, this meant that the area was grouped with a number of other parishes under the control of Barnet Rural Sanitary Authority in 1873.

It was the fear of losing power over local administration to Barnet that was to lead the ratepayers of Finchley to adopt the 1858 legislation. Finchley Local Board was formed in 1878, consisting of twelve members. There was tension between the ratepayers of North Finchley and the wealthier Church End area as those owning more property had more votes under the weighted voting system used. A proposal to merge with the neighbouring Friern Barnet Local Government District in 1881 was not carried out.

== Urban district ==
Wards of the Finchley Urban District

The Local Government Act 1894 redesignated various urban local government areas as urban districts, and Finchley Local Board became Finchley District Council in 1895. The tension that had existed in the local board continued among the twelve-member council until the urban district was divided into three wards (East, North and West), each electing four councillors, in 1898.

== Incorporation ==
Wards of the Finchley Municipal Borough

In 1926 consideration was first given to applying for a charter of incorporation to create Finchley a municipal borough. This was in response to fears that the area would be absorbed by the County of London, or lose powers to Middlesex County Council. Application was not made until March 1932, however, when a petition to the privy council was made by the inhabitant householders of the urban district. The petition was successful, and on 5 October 1933, the charter was presented to the Charter Mayor, councillor Vyvyan Wells by the Earl of Athlone.

The town council consisted of a mayor, six aldermen and eighteen councillors. Two councillors were elected for each of the three wards annually, and half of the aldermen were elected by the council every three years. The borough council subsequently increased in size in 1950 to 24 councillors and eight aldermen, with three councillors and one alderman representing each of eight wards: Glebe, Manor, Moss Hall, St Mary's, St Paul's, The Bishop's, Tudor, and Whetstone.

The Finchley Lido was the first element in a Finchley complex which was to include a town hall for which plans were drawn up in 1936 but never realised.

=== Borough council ===
The borough council was initially controlled by the Conservative Party. Opposition was provided by a handful of independents and a single Labour Party councillor. There was little or no change in the composition of the council prior to the outbreak of the Second World War in 1939, when elections were cancelled.

Following the ending of the conflict, elections were again held in 1945, with Independents taking every seat on the council. The Conservatives were able to regain a majority at the 1949 council election. From the enlargement of the council in 1950 to the elections of 1957 the membership was 29 Conservatives and three Labour members. In the latter year Liberals returned to the council, and quickly became the second-largest group on the council. At the final elections to Finchley council in 1963, the Liberals gained a majority of councillors and aldermen, with 19 seats to 13 for the Conservatives.

=== Coat of arms ===
Following the successful petition for municipal incorporation, the borough council was granted armorial bearings by the College of Arms by letters patent dated 10 July 1933. The arms were blazoned as follows:

Vert on a Chevron raguly between in chief two Bugle Horns stringed Or and in base a Mitre Argent garnished Gold a Rose Gules surmounted by another Argent.

And for a Crest On a Wreath Or and Vert a Finch proper resting the dexter claw on an Escutcheon Or changed with a Fleur-de-Lys Gules.

Supporters: On the dexter side a Lion and on the sinister side a Stag proper each gorged with a Collar suspended therefrom a Bugle Horn ensigned with a Ducal Coronet Or.

The arms had a green field, across which was placed a "raguly" chevron: the rough edges suggesting sawn off branches. Together these represented the oak woods that once covered much of Finchley. The area had been a favourite hunting ground of the Tudor monarchs, indicated by the hunting horns and Tudor Rose. The bishop's mitre recalled that much of Finchley belonged to the Bishops of London. The crest, placed on top of a helm and mantling, was an heraldic pun: a finch supporting a shield bearing a fleur de lis, for Finchley. The dexter supporter was a lion, from the arms of the Countess of Pembroke, from whom the Comptons, lord of the manor were descended. The sinister supporter was a stag, referring back to the ancient forest.

== Abolition ==
Under the London Government Act 1963, the municipal borough was abolished, with its area merging with the municipal borough of Hendon and the urban districts of Barnet, East Barnet and Friern Barnet to form the London Borough of Barnet on 1 April 1965.

== Twinning ==
Finchley Borough had four twin towns; the London Borough of Barnet continues these links:

- Jinja, Uganda, since 1963
- Le Raincy, France, since 1962
- Montclair, New Jersey, United States, since 1945
- Siegen-Wittgenstein, Germany, since 1951

== See also ==
- History of Finchley
- History of Church End Finchley
- History of East Finchley
- History of North Finchley
- Victoria County History
