= List of nature reserves in the London Borough of Barnet =

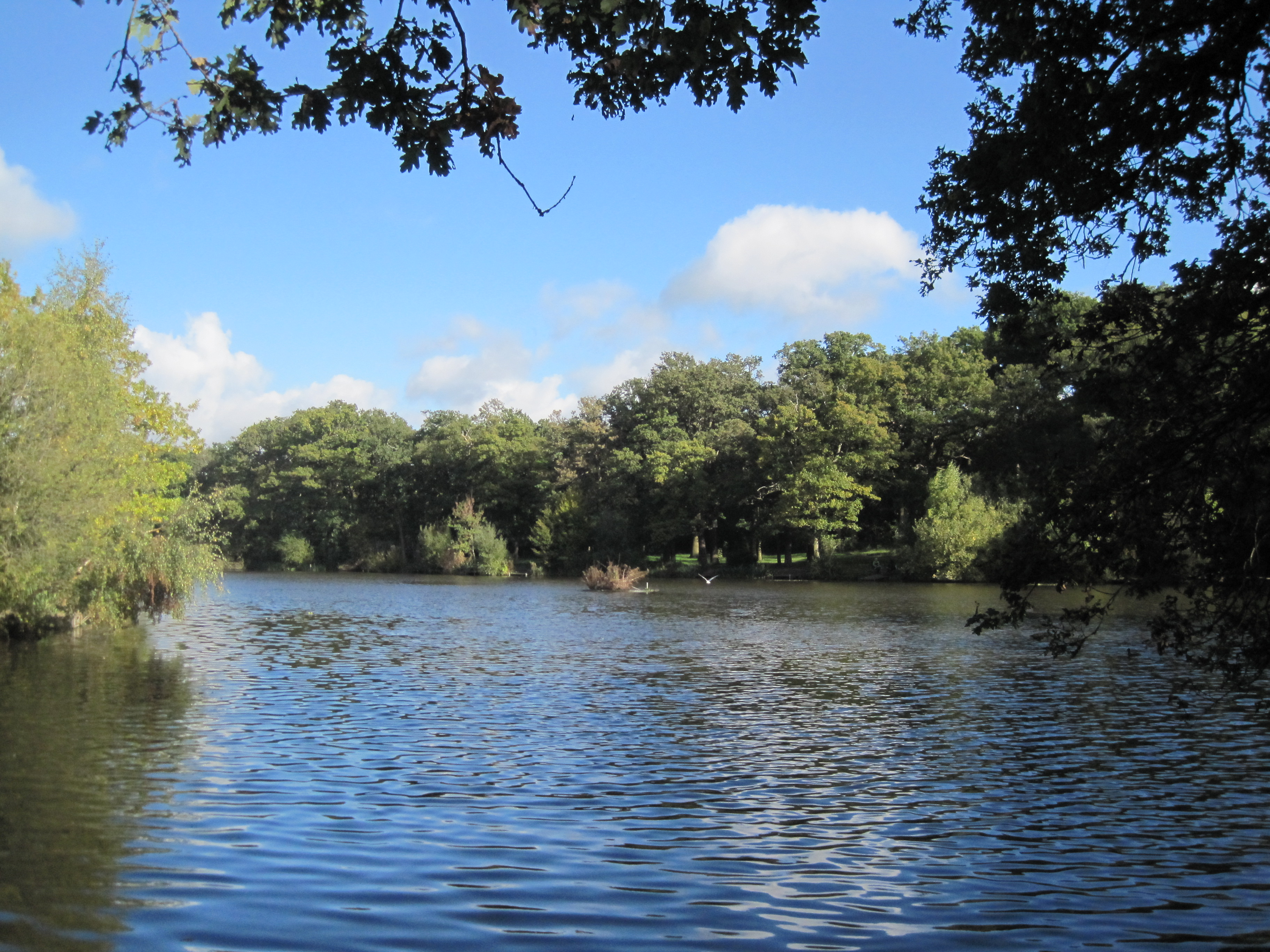
Beech Hill Lake in Monken Hadley Common

The London Borough of Barnet, on the northern outskirts of London, is mainly residential, but it has large areas of green space and farmland. The spread of suburban development into the countryside was halted by the designation of a statutory Green Belt around London after the Second World War, and almost one third of Barnet's area of 8,663 hectares (21,410 acres) is Green Belt. Without this control, Barnet would be very different today, and this list of nature reserves would be much shorter.

Most of Barnet lies over London Clay, which is poor for agriculture, and open land is mainly used for activities such as horse grazing, playing fields, parks and golf courses. Features of the traditional agricultural landscape have survived, such as old hedgerows, ancient trees and areas of herb-rich grassland. Some hay meadows have a large diversity of wild flowers, and the London Ecology Unit (LEU) (Note: The London Ecology Unit was established to provide advice to London boroughs following the abolition of the Greater London Council in 1986. In 2000 it was abolished and absorbed into the Greater London Authority.) described them as one of Barnet's most important ecological assets.

Barnet has large areas with designations intended to protect them from "inappropriate development", and to "provide the strongest protection for the preservation of Barnet's green and natural open spaces". As well as 2,466 hectares (6,090 acres) of Green Belt, Barnet has another 690 hectares (1,700 acres) of Metropolitan Open Land, which receive a similar level of protection. Watling Chase Community Forest (Note: Community Forests' objects include revitalising derelict land, providing new leisure facilities, preparing for climate change and increasing biodiversity.) covers 72 square miles (190 km^{2}), extending north and west from Totteridge into south Hertfordshire.

In 1992 Barnet Council commissioned the LEU to carry out a survey of wildlife habitats in the borough, which looked at green sites covering 4,055 hectares (10,020 acres), 45% of the borough. In 1997 the LEU published Nature Conservation in Barnet, which described 67 Sites of Importance for Nature Conservation (SINCs). This formed the basis of Barnet's nature conservation policies in its 2006 Unitary Development Plan, designated as "a material planning consideration" to be used as "non-statutory guidance". The table below lists SINCs described in Nature Conservation in Barnet. (Note: Nature Conservation in Barnet lists 67 sites, but only 66 are shown in this table because Grahame Park SINC no longer exists. It has been re-modelled and renamed Heybourne Park. The sites were listed on the Mayor of London's Wildweb website, which was taken down in December 2010. In spring 2012 it was replaced by a new site hosted by Greenspace Information for Greater London (GiGL), London's environmental record centre. This new website covers most SINCs, but others are left out, some which are not publicly accessible and others in error. Wildweb included maps of every site, but Nature Conservation in Barnet only has maps of the most important ones, the 'Sites of Metropolitan Importance'. GiGL has maps for the sites it lists, but the only map for the other sites is the map of the whole borough inside the back cover of Nature Conservation in Barnet. The list of SINCs in Nature Conservation in Barnet has not been updated and is still the basis for GiGL's database.) SINCs do not have statutory protection, but some sites are also wholly or partly designated as Sites of Special Scientific Interest (Note: There are 36 Sites of Special Scientific Interest in Greater London. The only one in Barnet is Brent Reservoir. Darland's Lake was formerly an SSSI but the designation was withdrawn when it was found that the rare fritillaries on the site had probably been planted.) or local nature reserves, (Note: Natural England lists 141 local nature reserves in Greater London. Seven of these are in Barnet, but two of these are divided into separate SINCs. Scratchwood and Moat Mount is one LNR but two SINCs, and the same applies to Coppett's Wood and Glebelands. Nine SINCs are thus also LNRs.) which do have statutory protection. According to a report of the Department for Environment, Food and Rural Affairs, 39% of Barnet's SINCs were "in positive conservation management" in 2009–10. Barnet Council did not supply figures for 2010–11, 2011–12 or 2012–13.

== Nature reserves ==
=== Key ===
Access

- P = free public access to all or most of the site
- PP = free public access to part of the site
- PL = public at limited times
- F = access on public footpaths only
- V = can be viewed from adjacent paths or roads only
- NO = no public access

Type

- M = Site of Metropolitan Importance – the best examples of London's habitats, or which contain rare species
- B1 = Site of Borough Importance Grade 1 – of significant value to the borough
- B2 = Site of Borough Importance, Grade 2 – as B1, but not as important
- L = Site of local importance – of particular value to nearby residents or schools
- LNR = Local nature reserve – of special interest locally for wildlife or geological features
- SSSI = Site of Special Scientific Interest – the country's best wildlife and geological sites
- CL = registered common land – free public access to all of site

=== Sites ===
Site	Photograph	Hectares (Note: The figures for area are taken from Nature Conservation in Barnet.)	Location (Note: The grid references are taken from Nature Conservation in Barnet. Click on the grid reference and then select a map to see the location of the reserve.)	Access	Type	Description
Arkley Lane and Pastures	Arkley Lane in autumn	52	Arkley; 51.655°N 0.230°W; TQ 225 965	PP	B2	The site covers Arkley Lane, a neighbouring woodland and fields on either side. The lane, now a quiet country path, is thought to be an old drovers' road. The hedges have massive gnarled oak trees, lofty ash and mature field maples, while the hedge bottoms have a diverse range of plants. The woodland is probably ancient, and supports a variety of nesting birds.
Arkley South Fields	Birds in Arkley South Field	38	Arkley; 51.641°N 0.232°W; TQ 224 951	V	B2	This is an extensive area of open grassland crossed by ditches and with mature hedgerows. Its importance lies in its breeding grassland birds, including skylarks and meadow pipits, and it is the main site in the borough for these species. Skylarks have declined in recent years, and they are a priority species in the UK Biodiversity Action Plan.
Arrandene Open Space and Featherstone Hill	Arrandene Open Space	25	Mill Hill; 51.613°N 0.230°W; TQ 226 920	P	M	This site's fields, which are divided by ancient hedgerows, were rated by the LEU as one of the best examples of old hay meadows in London. Wild flowers are abundant in the summer, with each field having its own specialities. The woods and scrub are important habitats for birds.
Ashley Lane	Ashley Lane in autumn	1	Hendon; 51.601°N 0.217°W; TQ 236 906	P	B2	This ancient trackway is over 400 years old. It has retained its ancient hedgerows along much of its length. Old oak and ash trees line the lane, and there are also some wild service-trees. The hedgerows have diverse shrub species.
Avenue House Grounds	Ornamental pond in Avenue House Grounds	3.5	Church End; 51.5975°N 0.1937°W; TQ 251 902	P	L	This small public park is the garden of Avenue House. It has a terrace with ornamental plants and a rockery. There is a pond which has hornwort, yellow iris and water-lilies, together with common frogs and koi carp. There are large areas of shrubbery.
Barfield Allotments Nature Park	Barfield Allotments Nature Park	0.9	Whetstone; 51.627°N 0.158°W; TQ 276 935	V	L	This small wildlife site is adjacent to a playground. Its scrub and grassland provide a haven for common lizards and slowworms, both legally protected species.
Barnet Countryside Centre	View of Barnet Countryside Centre from Byng Road	2.8	High Barnet; 51.658°N 0.216°W; TQ 234 969	V	L	The centre was established in the 1970s to provide schoolchildren with contact with farm animals and wildlife. After a period of closure the now renamed Barnet Environment Centre operates a full programme of environmental education visits for school children from Nursery to A level. Its woodland has a wide range of birds. Ponds support aquatic life and more open areas have a wide variety of insects.
Bell's Hill Burial Ground	Bells Hill Burial Ground	2.8	High Barnet; 51.649°N 0.215°W; TQ 235 959	P	L	This small cemetery has mown grass in the western part, but in the east it is less managed, and has a wide variety of wild flowers. The LEU described it as a fine site for butterflies, including gatekeeper, small skipper and meadow brown.
Belmont Open Space, Cockfosters	Belmont Open Space	1.0	Cockfosters; 51.647°N 0.157°W; TQ 275 958	P	L	This site is a secluded small park, which has a fair number of wild flowers and mature trees, together with an old hedgerow. The local Royal Society for the Protection of Birds has recorded a wide range of birds for a small suburban park.
Big Wood and Little Wood	A path in Big Wood in spring	8.6	Hampstead Garden Suburb; 51.583°N 0.190°W; TQ 255 887; 51.586°N 0.193°W; TQ 253 890	P	B1 LNR	These woods are remnants of an ancient large forest. Big Wood has a wide variety of trees and shrubs, with pedunculate oak the dominant species. There are several old wild service-trees. All the common woodland species of birds are present in the woods, and Little Wood has a small theatre.
Brent Reservoir (Welsh Harp)	Brent Reservoir	46 (Note: Brent Reservoir is partly in the London Borough of Brent, and 46 hectares out of the total of 96 is in Barnet.)	Hendon; 51.571°N 0.245°W; TQ 215 871	P	M LNR SSSI	Brent Reservoir is Barnet's only Site of Special Scientific Interest. It is an important breeding site for waterfowl and other birds, including one of Britain's largest breeding populations of great crested grebe. It has many uncommon wetland plants and insects, including over forty rare species of invertebrates. It is also one of the few London sites with water shrews.
Bruno's Field	Bruno's Field is hidden behind houses, and this is a view of trees in the field from Worcester Crescent	6.6	Mill Hill; 51.626°N 0.246°W; TQ 215 934	NO	B2	This steeply sloping site has a varied topography. On higher ground there are dry areas, while lower down there are areas of bog crossed by several small streams. The field has typical pasture herbs, a scattering of mature trees and a wide variety of birds.
Burtonhole Lane and Pasture	Burtonhole Lane	8.5	Mill Hill; 51.620°N 0.207°W; TQ 242 927	PP	B2	Burtonhole Lane is an old green lane which is now a bridleway and footpath. Its hedgerow has several species of trees, such as wild service-tree and black bryony, which suggest that it is ancient, and its verge is rich in wild flowers. The pasture area is dominated by Yorkshire Fog. It is crossed by Burtonhole Brook, which supports a number of uncommon plant species.
Cherry Tree Wood	Cherry Tree Wood in winter	4.7	East Finchley; 51.586°N 0.160°W; TQ 275 890	P	L	This local park was once part of the Bishop of London's Great Hornsey Park. it has an inner area of lawn with a playground and tennis courts, which is surrounded by the surviving ancient woodland. Its tree canopy is mainly oak and hornbeam, and its sparse undergrowth has a number of species associated with ancient woodland, such as wild garlic and wood-sedge.
Clarefield Park	Clarefield Park in spring	3.2	Brent Cross; 51.572°N 0.221°W; TQ 232 874	P	L	This small park has mown grass, a children's playground, scented shrubs and a small wildlife pond. In October 2010 Barnet Council gave planning consent for the Brent Cross Cricklewood Planning Application, which includes closure of the Clarefield Park and development of the area.
Clay Lane	Clay Lane	1.8	Edgware; 51.630°N 0.273°W; TQ 194 939	P	L	This is an ancient green lane which leads from Edgwarebury into the Hertfordshire countryside. An old hedge bank and herbaceous plants associated with ancient woodland suggest that it is of considerable antiquity. Its canopy has fine old oaks above an understorey of midland hawthorn, blackthorn and hazel.
Clitterhouse Recreation Ground	Clitterhouse Recreation Ground	16	Brent Cross; 51.569°N 0.215°W; TQ 238 871	P	L	This large recreation ground is managed as a sports field, and its main wildlife interest is in the unmanaged perimeter which has species such as crab apple which are typical of ancient hedgerows. The Brent Cross Cricklewood scheme includes improvements to the Recreation Ground.
College Farm	College Farm driveway	4.5	Finchley; 51.593°N 0.202°W; TQ 246 897	PP	L	College Farm in central Finchley was a working farm open to the public from 1980 until the foot and mouth epidemic in 2001. A charitable trust purchased the site in 2006, but as of March 2013 efforts to re-open the farm have failed, and the farm buildings are an equestrian shop. The site has trees and scrub which provide a habitat for birds, and pipistrelle bats have been recorded.
Coppetts Wood and Scrublands Local Nature Reserve	Path in Coppett's Wood	12	Colney Hatch; 51.609°N 0.157°W; TQ 277 915	P	B1 LNR	These sites provide a range of wildlife habitats. Coppetts Wood has a population of juneberry, and a pond which has yellow iris and breeding common frogs and smooth newts. Scrublands is on the site of a former sewage works. It has a number of rare plant and insect species.
Copthall Railway Walk and Copthall Old Common	The path of the old railway line along Copthall Railway Walk	11	Mill Hill; 51.607°N 0.223°W; TQ 231 912	P	B2	This is a green path along an old railway line, with Copthall Old Common at one side. The grassland on the walk is mostly false oat-grass, with a wide diversity of wild flowers. The hedges have some fine old oaks and areas of bluebells. A pond on the common has yellow iris and water-starwort. The site also has a range of birds and invertebrates, including glow-worms, a scarce and declining species.
Copthall South Fields	Hedgerow in Copthall South Fields	6	Mill Hill; 51.602°N 0.233°W; TQ 225 908	P	L	The fields have what the LEU described as "a surprisingly rural quality", even though they lie alongside the A1 road. The hedgerow trees are oak, ash and field maple, and the fields contain flowers typical of clay grassland, such as meadow vetchling, meadow buttercup and common sorrel.
Deans Brook and Stoneyfields Park	Deans Brook in Stoneyfields Park	3.3	Edgware; 51.625°N 0.263°W; TQ 203 929	PP	B2	Kingfishers and grey wagtails are often seen along the two kilometre Deans Brook, which largely follows a natural course. In Stoneyfields Park it has been widened into an ornamental lake, which has a wide fringe of tall water plants such as great and lesser reedmace, and breeding birds such as coots, moorhens and mallards. The woodland in the park is oak and hazel, and the hedgerows have plants which show that it is ancient, such as wood-sedge and ramsons.
Drivers Hill	Drivers Hill	10	Mill Hill; 51.616°N 0.221°W; TQ 231 920	V	B2	This site consists of several fields and two small woods. The pasture areas have a variety of grasses and wild flowers, including some typical of old pasture, such as crested dog's-tail and oval sedge. Wetter areas have plants such as tufted hair-grass and greater bird's-foot-trefoil, while the woods are mainly oak, ash and sycamore.
East Finchley Cemetery	Chapel and gravestones in East Finchley Cemetery	16	East Finchley; 51.592°N 0.184°W; TQ 258 896	P	L	Most of this cemetery is formally managed, but it has some old oaks which have survived from its rural past, and evergreen trees such as cedar of Lebanon and Wellingtonia provide a habitat for goldcrest and coal tit. In less managed areas there are wild flowers such as burnet saxifrage, and around the edges of the site ash and sycamore are evolving into woodland.
Edgware Way Rough	Edgware Way Rough	5.5	Edgware; 51.625°N 0.288°W; TQ 185 932	F	M	This site is London Clay pasture which has not been cultivated for many years. In areas of damp grassland it has London's largest population of the herb great burnet, and other rare plants characteristic of old meadows include sneezewort and devil's-bit scabious. Breeding birds include the yellowhammer and spotted flycatcher, both of which are declining species.
Edgwarebury Brook	Edgwarebury Brook in Edgwarebury Park	5	Edgware; 51.624°N 0.284°W; TQ 188 935	V	B2	This stream rises among fields and flows through Edgware Way Rough on to suburban Edgware, where it join Deans Brook. The most important section ecologically is the upper part, which was rated by the LEU as one of the best areas of wetland vegetation in Barnet. There is a mass of floating sweet-grass with clumps of brooklime and water pepper. The banks have clumps of great willowherb and trifid bur-marigold.
Edgwarebury Park	Edgwarebury Park	15	Edgware; 51.625°N 0.283°W; TQ 190 934	P	L	The hedgerows in this large park have fine oak and ash trees, and the presence of wild service-trees is considered an indicator that the hedges are ancient. It has a variety of wild flowers in damp areas and nesting birds include song thrush, mistle thrush, great spotted woodpecker and common whitethroat.
Folly Brook and Darland's Lake Nature Reserve	Darland's Lake	11	Arkley/Woodside Park; 51.625°N 0.205°W; TQ 240 934	P	B1	Darland's Lake, which is now a nature reserve, was originally an ornamental feature created by damming Folly Brook. The water quality is good, and Darland's Lake has extensive reed beds. On its margin there is a boggy wood of willows and alder, a scarce habitat in London. The site has a number of tree species typical of ancient woodland, and a diverse bird and invertebrate population, while eighteen species of mammal have been recorded.
Friary Park	Formal garden in Friary Park	8.8	Friern Barnet; 51.618°N 0.162°W; TQ 273 926	P	L	Old oak trees date from before the foundation of the park, and they support woodland birds such as nuthatch and treecreeper. Near a small stream, a tributary of Pymme's Brook, there are wildflowers such as cow parsley, lesser celandine, dog violet and garlic mustard.
Glebe Lane Pastures	Horses grazing in Glebe Lane Pastures	11	Arkley; 51.645°N 0.234°W; TQ 223 954	V	B1	This is an area of five fields which was once part of a communal pasture called Barnet Common. The grassland is unimproved clay grassland, a relic of the old common. It has many species of wild flowers, and the most important aspect of the site is its diverse old meadow plants. Some of the rarities have been found in temporary pools, such as bog stitchwort and pond and ivy-leaved crowfoot.
Glebelands Local Nature Reserve	Glebelands nature reserves	7.5	Colney Hatch; 51.604°N 0.169°W; TQ 270 911	P	B1 LNR	This is a fragment of the old Finchley Common. It has tall scrub and woodland, together with numerous streams and seasonal ponds. The pools have a number of rare species, and it is the only known London site for lesser water-plantain. Other rarities are thread-leaved water-crowfoot (Ranunculus trichophyllus) and marsh speedwell, and the site has diverse breeding birds.
Greenhill Gardens	Lake in Greenhill Gardens	1.5	High Barnet; 51.6446°N 0.1824°W; TQ 258 955	P	L	The principal feature of this small park is its large lake, with a wooded island. Water birds include mallard, mute swan, coot and moorhen, and pipistrelle and noctule bats have been seen foraging.
Hadley Green	Path in Hadley Green	10	Monken Hadley; 51.661°N 0.199°W; TQ 246 973	P	M	Hadley Green was the site of one of the major battles of the Wars of the Roses, the Battle of Barnet in 1471. It is mainly acid grassland with some wetter areas and several ponds. It has a number of rare species of plant, such as mat-grass and oval sedge in the grassland, lesser spearwort and marsh ragwort in the ditches, and tufted forget-me-not and fiddle dock in the ponds. There are also eleven species of dragonflies and damselflies.
Hampstead Heath Extension and Golders Hill Park	Formal garden in Golders Hill Park	46 (Note: Hampstead Heath SINC is composed of the main Heath in the London Borough of Camden and Hampstead Heath Extension and Golders Hill Park in Barnet. 46 hectares is in Barnet out of the total of 329.)	Golders Green; 51.575°N 0.186°W; TQ 258 878	P	M	The LEU described the hedges of Hampstead Heath Extension as some of the best on the Heath. It also has a chain of seven ponds which have a wide variety of aquatic and pond margin plant species. Golders Hill Park has areas of formal and less managed parkland. Swan Pond is a large ornamental lake which has a variety of exotic and native wildfowl.
Hendon Park and Northern Line Railway Cutting	Hendon Park	14	Hendon; 51.582°N 0.222°W; TQ 233 884	P	L	The site is mainly informal parkland, with mown grass and mature trees. A variety of small birds forage among the tall hedgerows at the northern end. The railway cutting has rough grassland and patches of woodland, which provide a habitat for birds such as the great spotted woodpecker and goldcrest.
King George's Fields	King George's Fields	27	Monken Hadley; 51.656°N 0.195°W; TQ 250 969	P	B2	This site is mainly covered with coarse grasses, but it also has herb-rich fields dominated by creeping bent and red fescue, together with wild flowers commonly found on unimproved grassland. Oak trees grow in old hedges, and breeding birds include sparrowhawk and stock dove.
Lakeside Nature Reserve	View of Lakeside Nature Reserve from a footpath off Strathmore Gardens	0.6	Church End; 51.5994°N 0.1850°W; TQ 257 904	V	L	This site is a lake with a small island behind an office block, surrounded by a belt of trees. The island provides a safe breeding ground for wildfowl, away from mammalian predators. The lake also has fish, frogs, toads and terrapins.
Lower Dollis Brook, Brent Park and River Brent	Dollis Brook in Windsor Open Space	28	Woodside Park/Hendon; 51.572°N 0.236°W; TQ 243 906	P	B2	This site covers Dollis Brook between Woodside Park and its end in Temple Fortune, where it becomes the River Brent, the Brent as far as the A1, and Brent Park. At the Woodside Park end there is a wild area with old ivy-clad oaks and alder. Brent Park has a lake which may have been created by the abbots of Westminster almost a thousand years ago. It has a wooded island which provides a refuge for birds.
Mill Hill Golf Course	Mill Hill Golf Course	60	Mill Hill; 51.634°N 0.259°W; TQ 206 942	NO	B1	The golf course has several small streams which meet in Stoneyfields Lake, which was formed by damming Deans Brook. On the edges of the fairways there is a variety of wild flowers, some of them relics of old farm meadows. The most important area ecologically is acid grassland which contains the rare plant dyer's greenweed.
Mill Hill Old Railway Nature Reserve	Path following the route of the old railway line in Mill Hill Old Railway Nature Reserve	9	Mill Hill; 51.612°N 0.257°W; TQ 203 917	PL	B2	This linear nature reserve on the site of an old railway line is managed by the London Wildlife Trust. Trees in the woodland canopy include oak and sycamore, and there is a scrub layer of hawthorn, blackthorn and grey willow. The grassland has a range of wild flowers, and the site has a large population of slow-worms.
Mill Hill Substation Pastures	Mill Hill Substation Pastures	15	Mill Hill; 51.6168°N 0.2106°W; TQ 240 925	V	M	The LEU described this site as a "remarkable example of unimproved herb-rich pasture on damp clay soil, with substantial populations of attractive and locally uncommon wild flowers". Burtonhole Brook crosses the site, providing a corridor of damp habitat, and old hedgerows and small areas of woodland provide a refuge for birds.
Moat Mount Open Space and Barnet Gate Wood	Leg of Mutton Pond in Moat Mount Open Space	110	Mill Hill; 51.634°N 0.253°W; TQ 215 943	P	B2 LNR	Moat Mount is a large hilly area, which slopes down to valleys, which have open fields crossed by old hedgerows. Towards the top of the hill woodland opens out to Leg of Mutton Pond, which has clumps of water-lilies and Nuttall's waterweed. The site also includes the neighbouring Barnet Gate Wood, which is probably a remnant of an ancient forest.
Monken Hadley Common	Monken Hadley Common	72	Monken Hadley; 51.660°N 0.177°W; TQ 263 972	P	B1 CL	This large common is mostly wooded, with small areas of grassland. Daubenton's bats forage over an artificial lake called Jack's Lake. The principal trees are oak, hornbeam and beech, and the ground flora includes several plants which are normally only present in ancient woodland. Breeding birds include sparrowhawk, tawny owl and cuckoo.
Mutton Brook	Mutton Brook in Brookside Walk	13	Hampstead Garden Suburb; 51.587°N 0.210°W; TQ 251 892	P	L	The brook is a tributary of the River Brent. Oak, ash and willow trees fringe the bank, providing a habitat for birds, and grey wagtails forage at the water's edge. Woodland wild flowers include dog's mercury and winter heliotrope.
New Southgate Cemetery	New Southgate Cemetery	20	Brunswick Park; 51.624°N 0.144°W; TQ 286 933	P	B2	The cemetery is closely managed in the vicinity of recent burials, but woodland has developed in other areas, where young oak, ash, birch and sycamore are growing between mature oak and yew trees. There is a range of breeding birds such as green and great spotted woodpeckers, coal tit and nuthatch, and the cemetery is the most northerly known site for the dusky cockroach, a native species.
North Middlesex Golf Course Ponds	Pond at North Middlesex Golf Course	0.8	Whetstone; 51.621°N 0.168°W; TQ 269 930	NO	B2	These ponds have one of few known populations of palmate newts in Barnet, and there is also a colony of the more common smooth newt. The pond edges have some Michaelmas daisies and water mint. A ditch leads to a small area of woodland, and this is probably an important corridor for amphibia.
Northern Line Embankment, High Barnet	Northern Line railway embankment from a footbridge off Wyatts Farm Open Space	6.5	Totteridge/High Barnet; 51.641°N 0.185°W; TQ 256 951	V	B2	The vegetation varies between low bramble scrub and light woodland, and it provides a habitat for small birds such as tits and finches. The main ecological significance of the site lies in one of Barnet's few known colonies of the common lizard, which are protected by the absence of pesticides, and freedom from dogs, cats and people.
Oak Hill Wood	Oak Hill Wood in East Barnet	10	East Barnet; 51.6409°N 0.1521°W; TQ 280 951	P	B1 LNR	This wood is managed by the London Wildlife Trust. The canopy is oak, hornbeam and ash, with some horse chestnut trees. Ground plants include bluebell and wood speedwell. A small stream flows through the wood, and a meadow has common wild flowers and butterflies. The site also has several bat species.
Oakleigh Park Rail Cutting	Oakleigh Park Rail Cutting looking south	8.0	Oakleigh Park; 51.633°N 0.162°W; TQ 272 944	V	L	This site has a diverse habitat. The eastern bank has an open expanse of bramble scrub with clumps of blackthorn, hawthorn and dog-rose. The western bank has a mature woodland of oak, ash and sycamore, with goat willow in wetter areas. Tall herbs are useful to seed eating birds such goldfinch, wrens and dunnocks.
Princes Park	Princes Park in Temple Fortune	1.2	Temple Fortune; 51.5820°N 0.2061°W; TQ 243 885	P	L	This small park is highly managed, with mown lawns and flowerbeds, but some of the old trees pre-date the surrounding houses. In the south-east corner a small woodland appears to be a fragment of an old farm wood. Mature hawthorns around the perimeter may be relics of old farm hedgerows.
Pymme's Brook	Pymme's Brook in Oak Hill Park	13	Monken Hadley/New Southgate; 51.6320°N 0.1462°W; TQ 284 942	P	B2	Two separate sections of Pymme's Brook are included in this site. The northern section, which runs 500 metres from Monken Hadley, goes through rough grassland and scattered scrub, with a narrow strip of oak woodland. The three kilometre southern stretch to the boundary with Enfield is largely wooded. One part is ancient, with an understorey which includes wild service-trees, midland hawthorn, field maple and crab apple.
Rowley Green Common	Rowley Green Common, Arkley	4.9	Arkley; 51.6502°N 0.2433°W; TQ 217 960	P	M LNR CL	This site has a mosaic of habitats with different conditions and many rare species. Most of it is woodland with fairly young trees, and the most important area ecologically is a sphagnum bog, described by the LEU as an extremely rare habitat in south-east England. The site also has an area of acid grassland and a pond which supports diverse wetland plants.
Rowley Lodge Field	Rowley Lodge Field, Arkley	4.4	Arkley; 51.6456°N 0.2410°W; TQ 218 955	F	B2	This is an old hay meadow with a few oak trees and small patches of scrub. It has diverse wild flowers, including great burnet and pignut. Areas of acid grassland are dominated by red fescue, together with sheep's sorrel and tormentil.
Scratchwood	Path in Scratchwood, Mill Hill	57	Mill Hill; 51.640°N 0.264°W; TQ 201 948	P	M LNR	Part of Scratchwood is ancient woodland, possibly dating back to the end of the last ice age, which has small streams, tall sessile oaks and old hornbeams. Other areas include Bluebell Wood, which is more open and has extensive carpets of wild flowers, and Scratchwood Pond which has marshy areas nearby described by the LEU as botanically very rich.
Silk Stream and Burnt Oak Brook	Silk Stream in Silkstream Park	8	Edgware; 51.599°N 0.259°W; TQ 207 903	PP	B2	These streams were described by the LEU as valuable wildlife corridors through suburban housing. Mallards and grey wagtails are often seen along the banks, and fish include three-spined stickleback. The streams are best seen when they go through parks, such as Silkstream Park, Montrose Recreation Ground and Rushgrove Park.
St Pancras and Islington Cemetery	Gravestones in St Pancras and Islington Cemetery	74	East Finchley; 51.600°N 0.165°W; TQ 272 907	P	B2	Parts of this cemetery which are no longer used for burials are managed for nature conservation. These areas have woodland and open grassland, while Strawberry Vale Brook which flows through the north-east corner. The LEU considered the understorey of the wood as surprisingly rich, including pignut, goldilocks buttercup, cuckooflower, primrose, wild and barren strawberries.
Sulloniacis Pastures	Plaque for Sullionacis Roman site	4.2	Edgware; 51.632°N 0.302°W; TQ 176 940	V	B2	Most of this site is herb-rich grassland on London Clay, and it has many flowers typical of clay pasture such as greater bird's-foot-trefoil, burnet saxifrage, agrimony and devil's-bit scabious. There are also small plots of woodland and scrub.
Sunny Hill Park and Hendon Churchyard	Sunny Hill Park	22	Hendon; 51.597°N 0.230°W; TQ 227 901	P	L	Most of this site is formal parkland, but at the southern end there is a wild flower meadow with black knapweed, common sorrel, lesser stitchwort and three species of buttercup. An area at the northern end is managed to preserve slow-worms.
The Mill Field	Path in The Mill Field, Mill Hill	3.4	Mill Hill; 51.622°N 0.236°W; TQ 221 929	P	B2	The grassland in the more natural part of this site has scattered oak and willow scrub, and mature trees and hedgerows on the periphery. There is a variety of wild flowers, and the small copper butterfly has been recorded. A small pond has rich aquatic flora including nodding bur-marigold and branched bur-reed.
Totteridge Common	Pink Cottage Pond on Totteridge Common	3	Totteridge; 51.6315°N 0.2227°W; TQ 230 939	P	B2 CL	The trees on this site are mostly sycamore and elm, but it also has two black poplars, which are considered England's most threatened native tree. The most important feature ecologically is a chain of old ponds, which are valuable for dragonflies, other insects and amphibians. Plants in deep water include white water-lily and curled and broad-leaved pondweeds.
Totteridge Croft Field (or Dell's Down Acre)	View towards Totteridge Croft Field nature reserve	2.4	Totteridge; 51.626°N 0.198°W; TQ 248 934	NO	B1	This site was described by the LEU as an interesting example of unimproved clay grassland. Much of it is covered with tufted hair-grass, but there is considerable variety between the different fields. There is a variety of wild flowers, including uncommon species such as sneezewort and pignut.
Totteridge Fields and Highwood Hill	Totteridge Fields Local Nature Reserve, Arkley	103	Arkley; TQ 231 945; 51.632°N 0.234°W; TQ 222 935	PP	M LNR	This site has large areas of uncultivated grassland with old hedgerows. Part of it is a local nature reserve managed by the London Wildlife Trust. There is a wide range of wild flowers, including some that are locally uncommon, and breeding birds include the skylark, which is a declining species. A number of beetles and spiders found here are nationally rare.
Totteridge Green	Laurel Farm Pond in Totteridge Green	4.6	Totteridge; 51.6281°N 0.1953°W; TQ 250 936	P	B2 CL	This is a typical English village green with open grassland, scattered trees, small areas of scrubby woodland and a pond. The main grasses are perennial rye-grass and other coarse meadow species. There are several damp hollows, probably former ponds, which have uncommon wild flowers such as great burnet and bog stitchwort. Woodland plants include soft shield-fern, which is rare locally.
Turner's Wood	Entrance to Turner's Wood, Hampstead Garden Suburb	2.4	Hampstead Garden Suburb; 51.5722°N 0.1785°W; TQ 263 875	NO	B2	This private nature reserve is a fragment of Bishops Wood, part of the Bishop of London's medieval estate. The landscape is undulating, with two small streams going through the centre. The main tree in the canopy is sessile oak, with a rich understorey including rowan, midland hawthorn and some wild service-trees. The site is managed for nature conservation, especially for birds.
Upper Dollis Brook	Dollis Brook in Brook Farm Open Space	40	Mill Hill/Woodside Park; 51.5717°N 0.2361°W; TQ 253 943	P	B1	This six kilometre long stretch runs from Arkley to Woodside Park, and the site also includes neighbouring areas such as Whetstone Stray and Wyatt's Open Space, which have flower-rich meadows divided by old hedges. The hedges have uncommon shrubs such as spindle and buckthorn. Birds seen along the stream include kingfishers, grey wagtails and moorhens.
Woodridge School Nature Reserve	Woodridge Nature Reserve in Woodside Park	2.5	Woodside Park; 51.6227°N 0.1955°W; TQ 250 930	P	L	This small site was established as a nature garden for local primary schools. It has young oak woodland and rough grassland, which has wild flowers such as pignut and yellow archangel.

== See also ==
- Barnet parks and open spaces
- List of Sites of Special Scientific Interest in Greater London
- List of local nature reserves in Greater London

== Sources ==
- Hewlett, Jan; Yarham, Ian; Curson, David (1997). Nature Conservation in Barnet. London Ecology Unit. ISBN 1-871045-27-4.
- "iGiGL the data portal of Greenspace Information for London". Greenspace Information for Greater London. 2013. Archived from the original on 2014-01-14.
- "Barnet Unitary Development Plan, adopted 2006 (updated 2009)". London Borough of Barnet. Archived from the original on 2013-01-18.
- "Planning report PDU/1483/01, Brent Cross Cricklewood in the London Borough of Barnet, planning application no. C/17559/08" (PDF). 11 February 2009. Archived from the original (PDF) on 27 August 2012.
