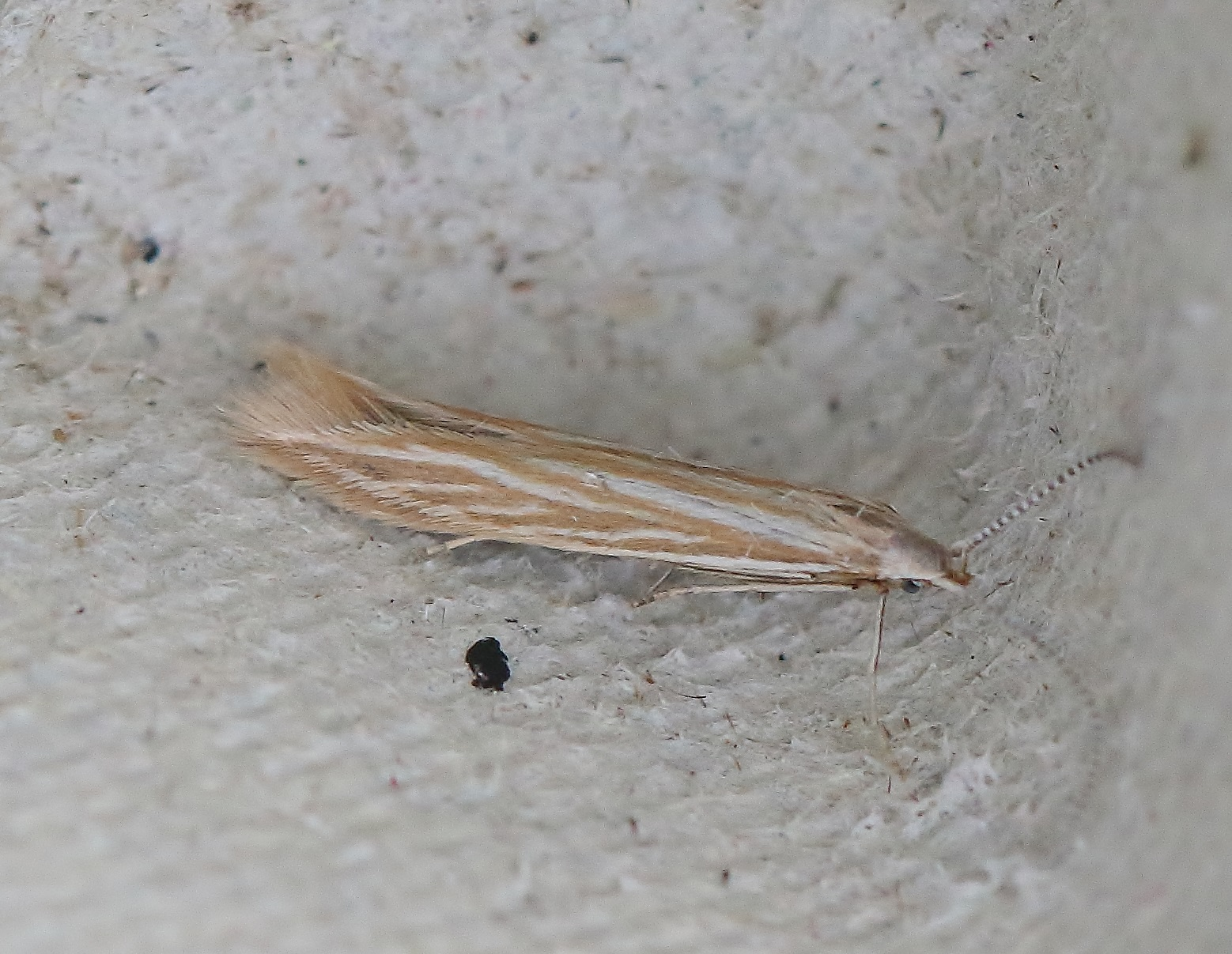

Scientific classification
- Kingdom: Animalia
- Phylum: Arthropoda
- Class: Insecta
- Order: Lepidoptera
- Family: Coleophoridae
- Genus: Coleophora
- Species: C. argentula

Binomial name
- Coleophora argentula (Stephens, 1834)

Synonyms
- Porrectaria argentula Stephens, 1834; Casignetella argentula; Coleophora cothurnella Duponchel, 1843

= Coleophora argentula =

Species of moth

Coleophora argentula is a moth of the family Coleophoridae, found in most of Europe, Russia and Asia Minor. The larvae live in cases and feed on the seeds of yarrow and sneezewort.

== Description ==
The wingspan is 9.5–13 mm. The forewing is cream-coloured with distinct white longitudinal stripes and with oblique streaks and scattered fuscous scales. Certain identification requires examination of genitalia preparations. Adults are on wing in June and July.

Ovum

Eggs are laid on the flowers of yarrow (Achillea millefolium) and sneezewort (Achillea ptarmica).

Larva

The early instars feed from early September on the withering flowers and seeds.

Pupa

Pupation takes place within the case.

== Gallery ==
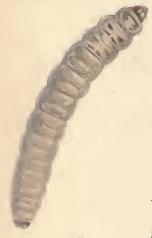
Larva

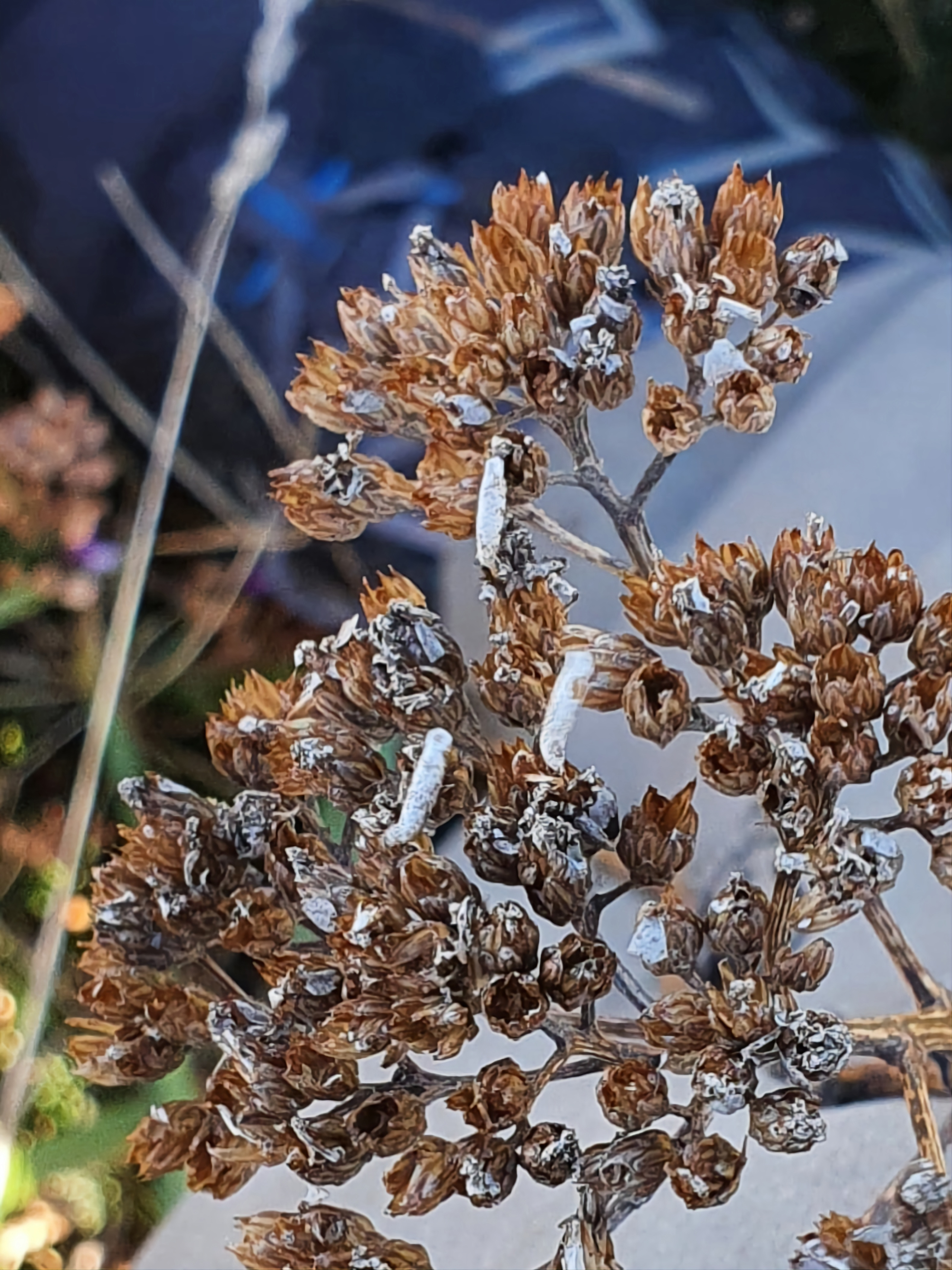
Larval cases on yarrow seeds

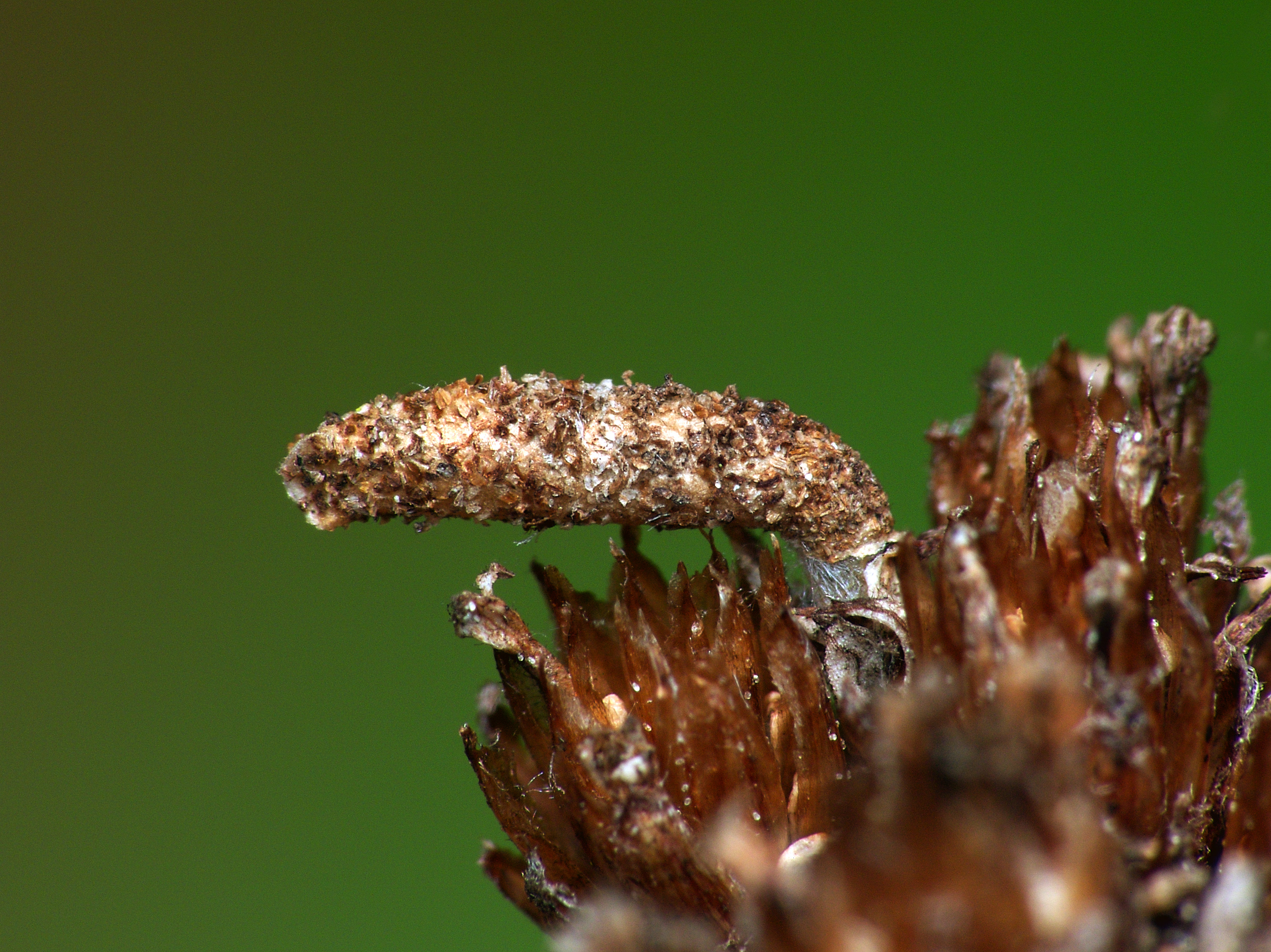
Close up of larval case

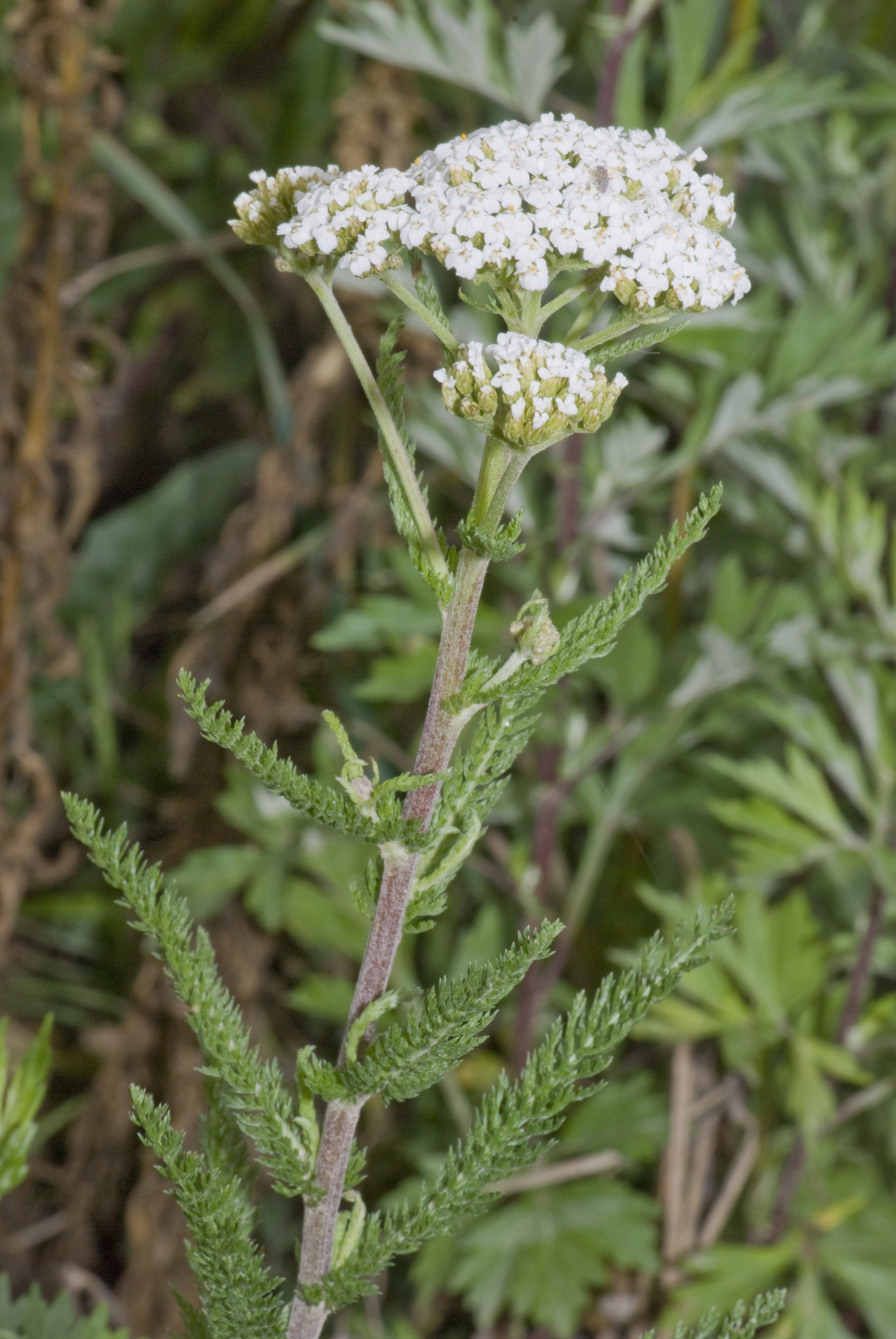
Yarrow (Achillea millefolium)

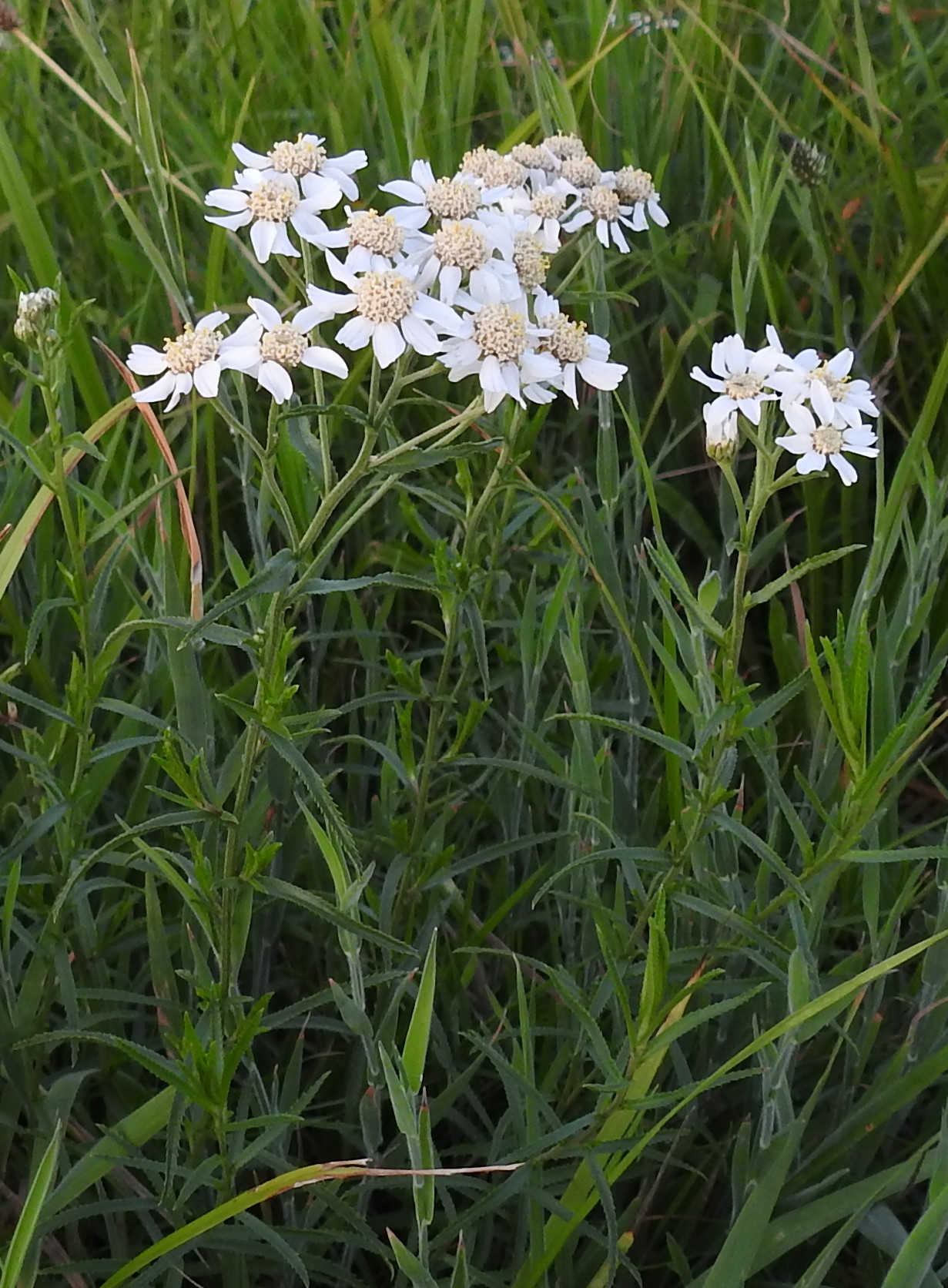
Sneezewort (Achillea ptarmica)

== Etymology ==
The genus Coleophora was raised by the German entomologist Jacob Hübner in 1822. The name refers to a sheath, i.e. to carry, from the portable case the larvae make. The moth was named argentula by the English entomologist James Francis Stephens in 1834, from a specimen found near London, England. The species name comes from argentum – the silver streaks along the veins on the forewing, which are in contrast to the ochreous ground colour.
