= Drivers Hill =

UK nature reserve

Coordinates: 51.616°N 0.221°W

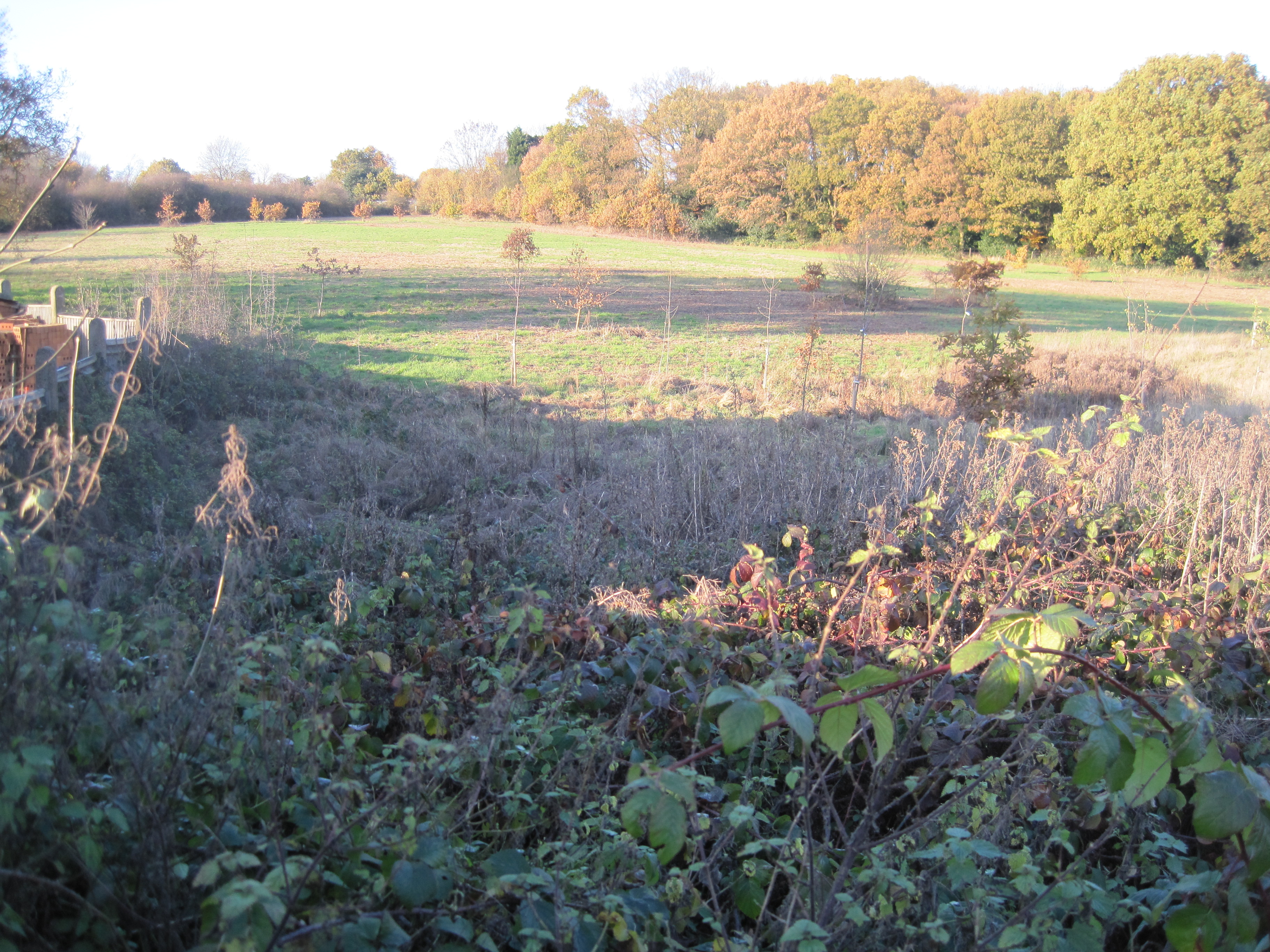
Drivers Hill from Woodcote Avenue

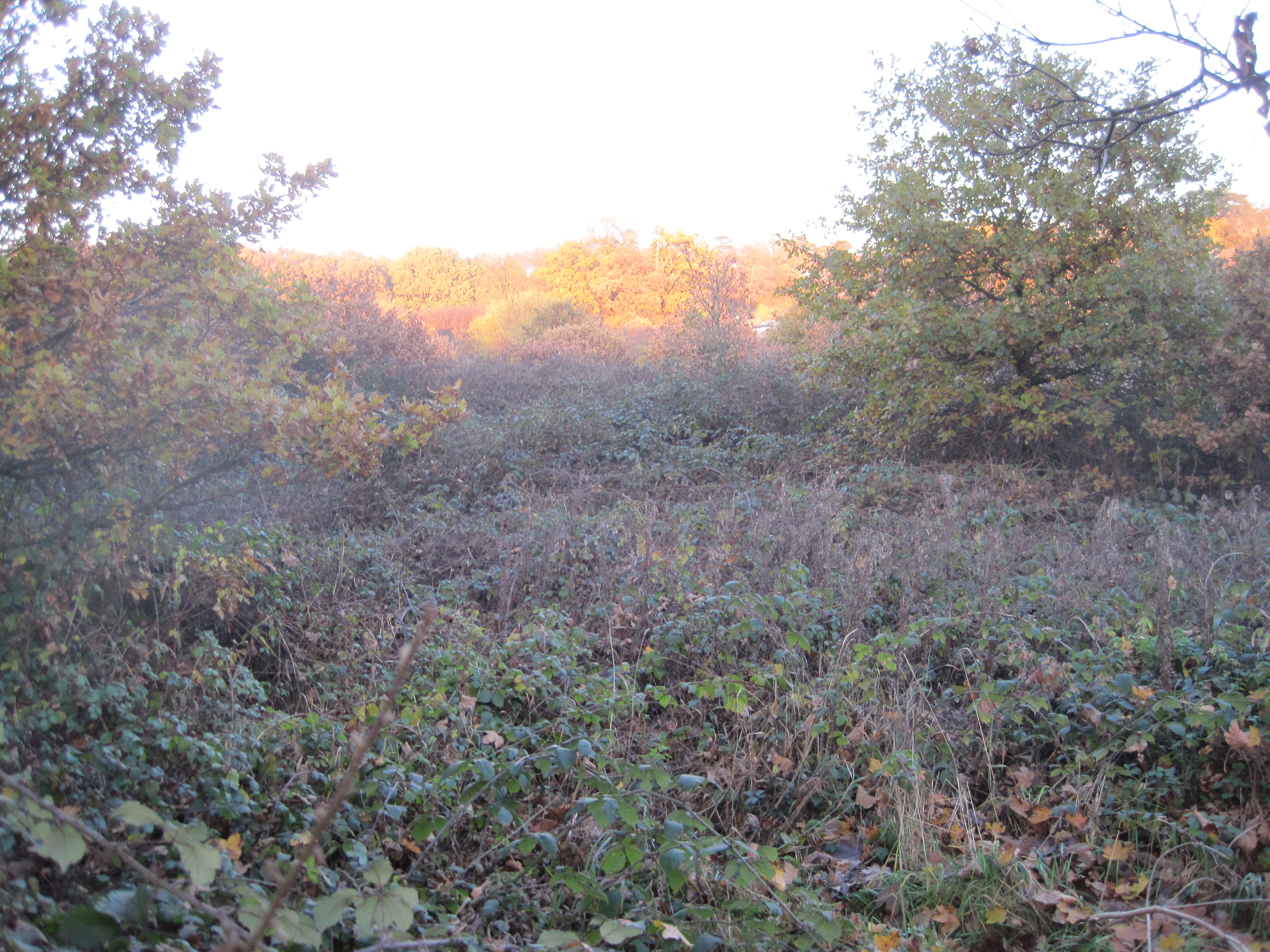
Drivers Hill from Mill Hill Cemetery

Drivers Hill is a ten hectare Site of Borough Importance for Nature Conservation, Grade II, in Mill Hill in the London Borough of Barnet. It is owned by the Jehovah's Witnesses, who built their national headquarters, Watch Tower House, on the site in 1955. The house is a major printing works where 120 million Jehovah's Witnesses periodicals were printed in 2002.

Drivers Hill consists of a number of fields and two small woods. The fields contain some species of flower typical of old pasture, such as crested dog's tail, oval sedge and lady's bedstraw. The larger wood, which is at the north of the site, is called Wentworth Hall Wood, and has a canopy mainly of pedunculate oak and ash. The other wood, in the south-west corner, is dominated by oak and sycamore.

There is no public access, but the fields can be viewed from the end of Woodcote Avenue, and the south-west wood from Milespit Hill and Mill Hill Cemetery.

== See also ==
- Nature reserves in Barnet
