= Mill Hill Substation Pastures =

Protected area in Barnet, London

Coordinates: 51.6168°N 0.2106°W

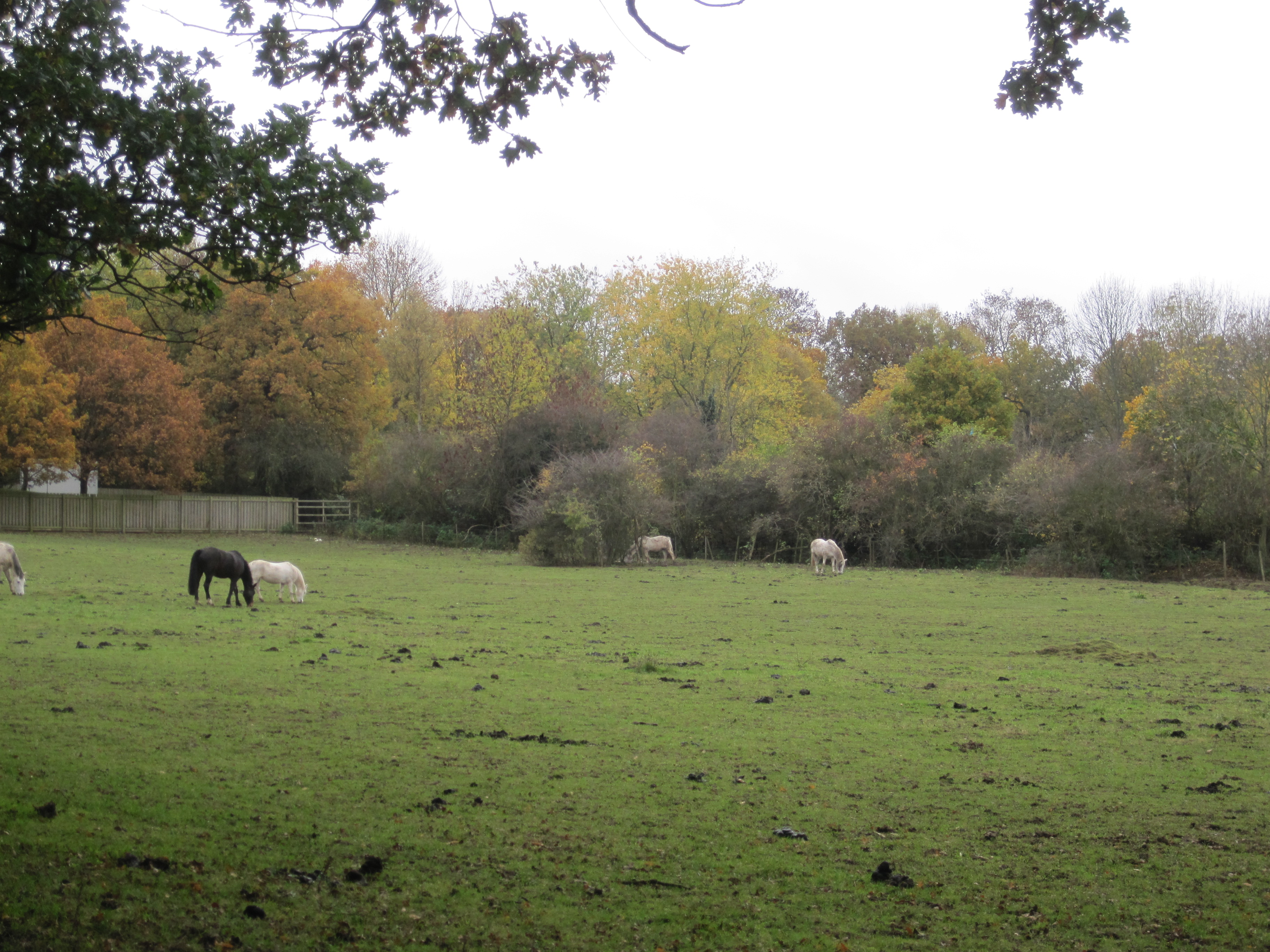
View from Burtonhole Lane

Mill Hill Substation Pastures is a fifteen-hectare Site of Metropolitan Importance for Nature Conservation in Mill Hill in the London Borough of Barnet.

The reserve consists of pastures grazed by horses around Mill Hill Electricity Substation. These contain patches of unimproved herb-rich pasture on damp clay soil. Locally uncommon plants include devil's bit scabious, sneezewort, pepper-saxifrage and red bartsia. The dividing hedges appear to be very old, and Burtonhole Brook, a tributary of Folly Brook, flows through the site, adding to its diversity of habitat. The hedgerows and woodland provide a refuge for birds.

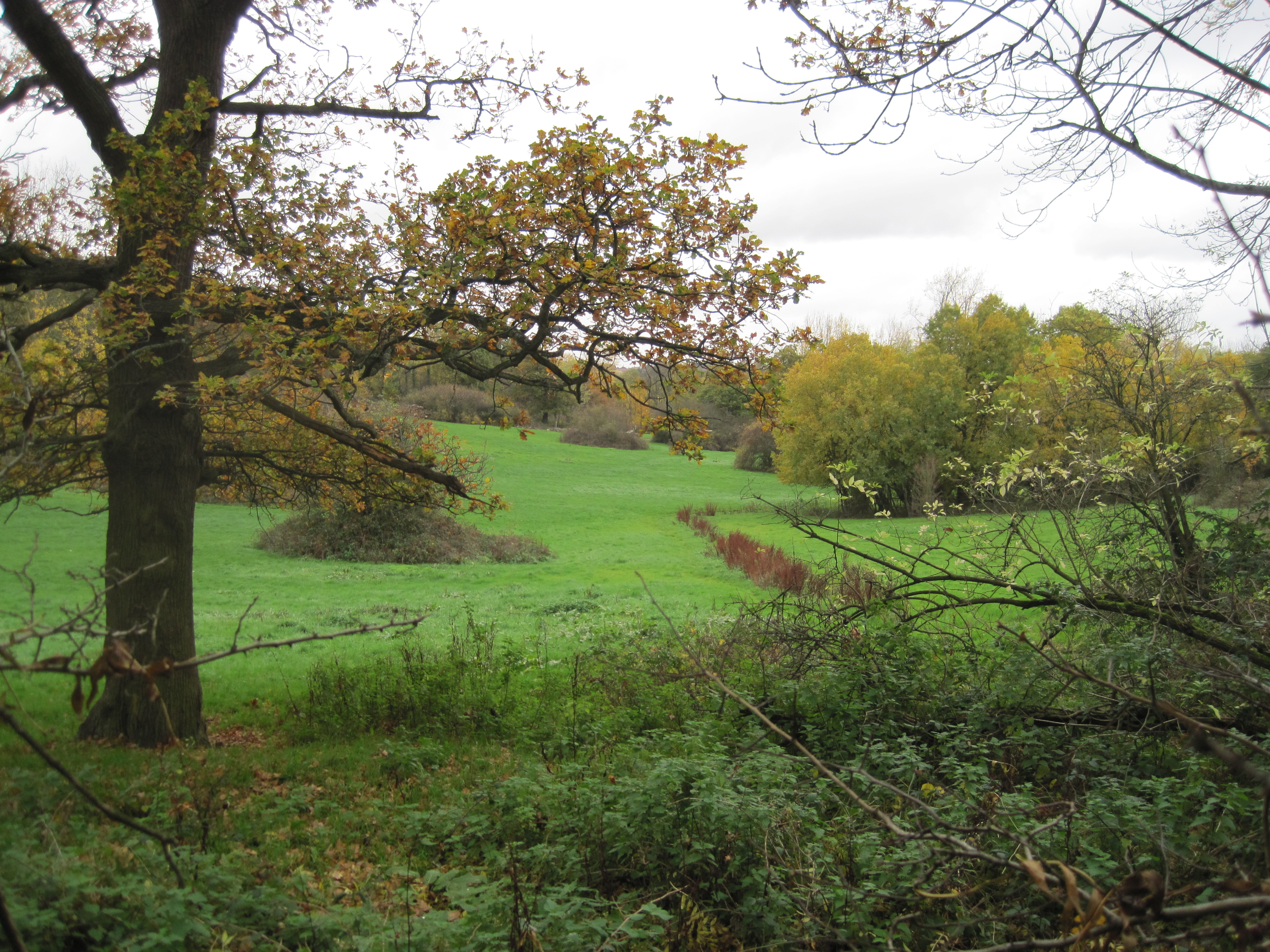
View from Partingdale Lane

The reserve is on private land, but it can be viewed from Burtonhole Lane and Partingdale Lane.

== See also ==
- Nature reserves in Barnet
