= Clay Lane =

Footpath and bridleway in Edgware, London

Coordinates: 51.630°N 0.273°W

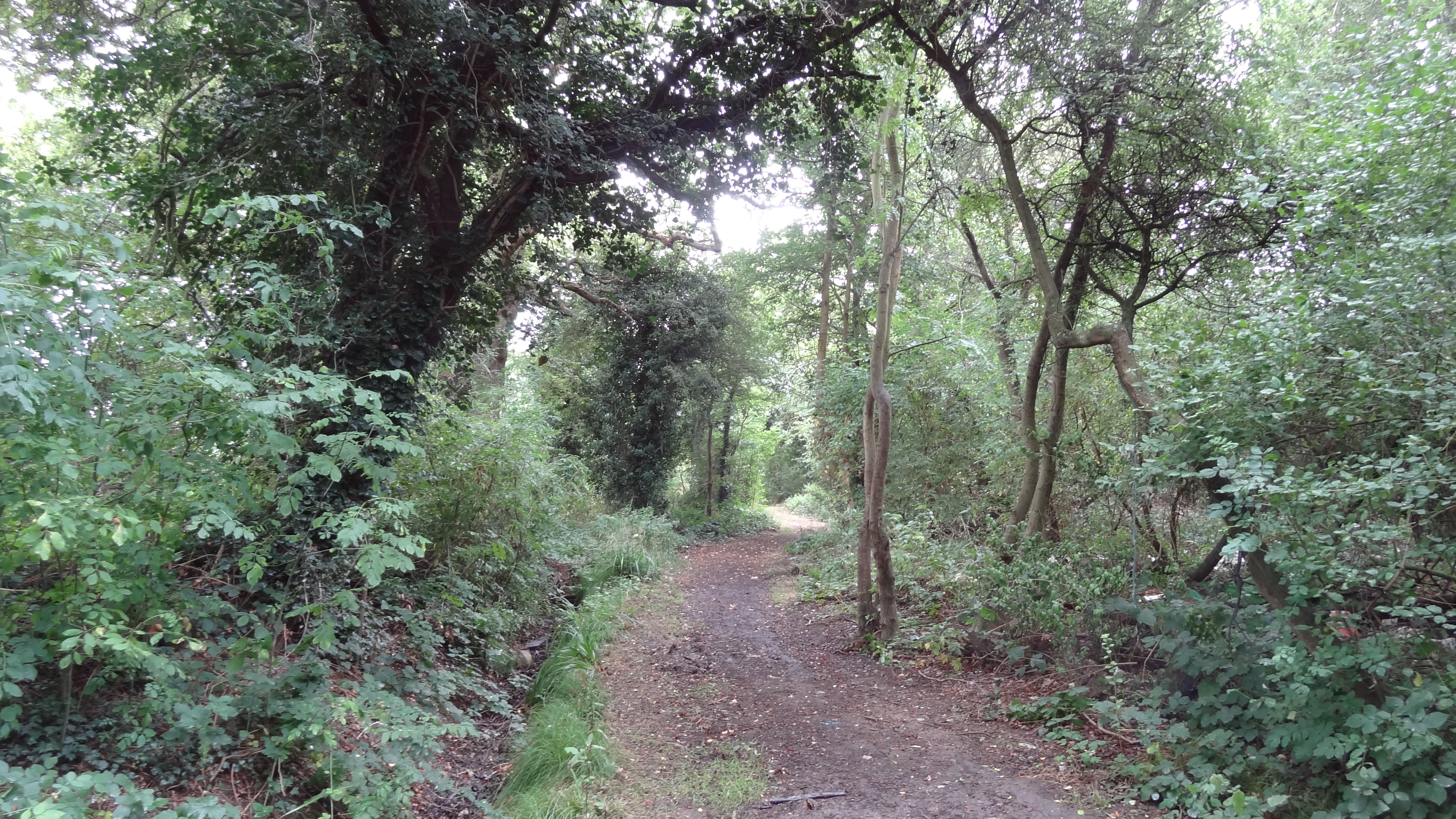
Clay Lane

Clay Lane is a one kilometre long public footpath and bridle way in Edgware in the London Borough of Barnet. It is a Site of Local Importance for Nature Conservation.

It is an old road, recorded back to 1597, which is now a quiet country lane. The path is lined with ancient hedgerows and there are old oak, field maple and ash trees. Honeysuckle and black bryony provide evidence of the hedgerow's antiquity.

The path skirts Edgwarebury Cemetery, and in 2008 Belsize Square Synagogue applied to extend the cemetery with access across Clay Lane. The application was opposed by members of the London Wildlife Trust and the Royal Society for the Protection of Birds. who argued that the extension would be environmentally damaging, and in 2009 Barnet Council rejected the application. The London Wildlife Trust applied to have Clay Lane designated a Village Green under the Commons Registration Act, 1965, which would permanently protect it against development. The Synagogue appealed against the rejection, and in 2010 the appeal was successful with a reduction of the crossings of Clay Lane from three to one. The scheme was then carried out.

Clay Lane runs between Bushfield Crescent and Edgwarebury Lane.

== See also ==
- Nature reserves in Barnet
