= Clarefield Park =

Park in Barnet, London, United Kingdom

Coordinates: 51.572°N 0.221°W

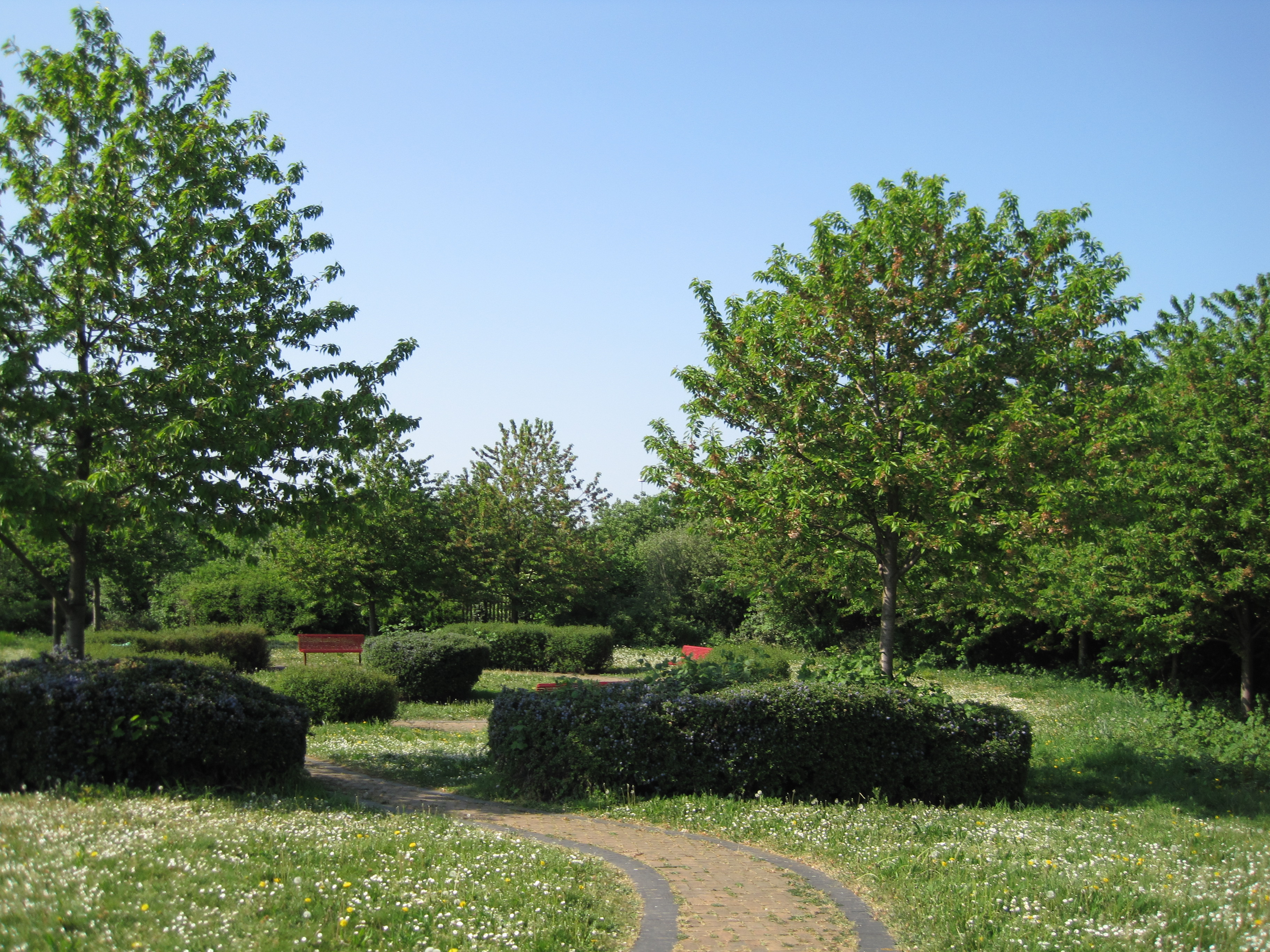
Clarefield Park

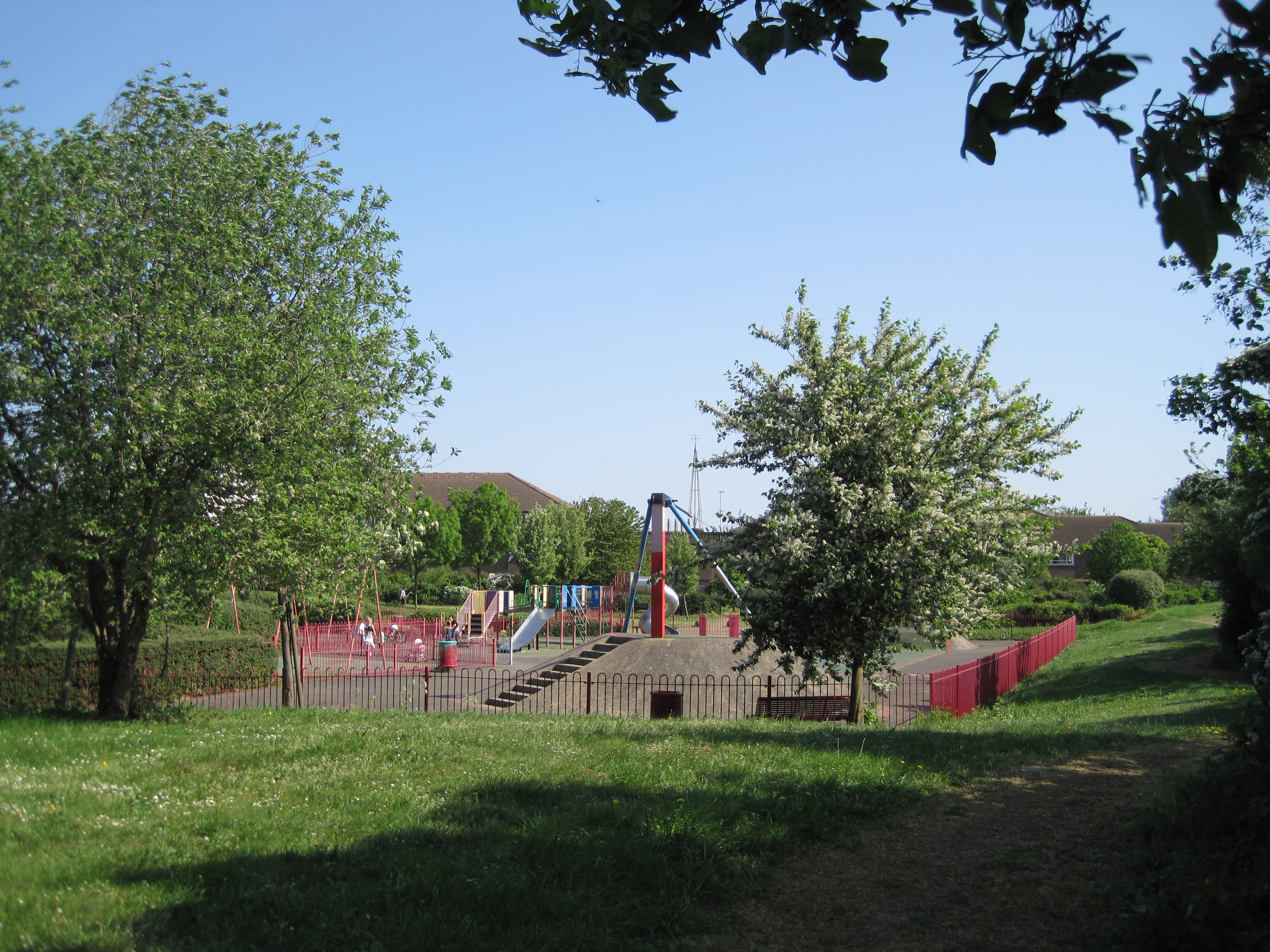
Playground

Clarefield Park is a small park and Site of Local Importance for Nature Conservation in Brent Cross in the London Borough of Barnet.

It was developed on former wasteland, and has mown grassland, a playground and sports facilities.

There is access from Claremont Way.

In October 2010, Barnet Council gave planning consent for the Brent Cross Cricklewood Planning Application which includes closure of the park and development of the area, but as of August 2019, the park is still open.

== See also ==
- Barnet parks and open spaces
- Nature reserves in Barnet
