= Barfield Allotments Nature Park =

Parkland in London, England

Coordinates: 51.627°N 0.158°W

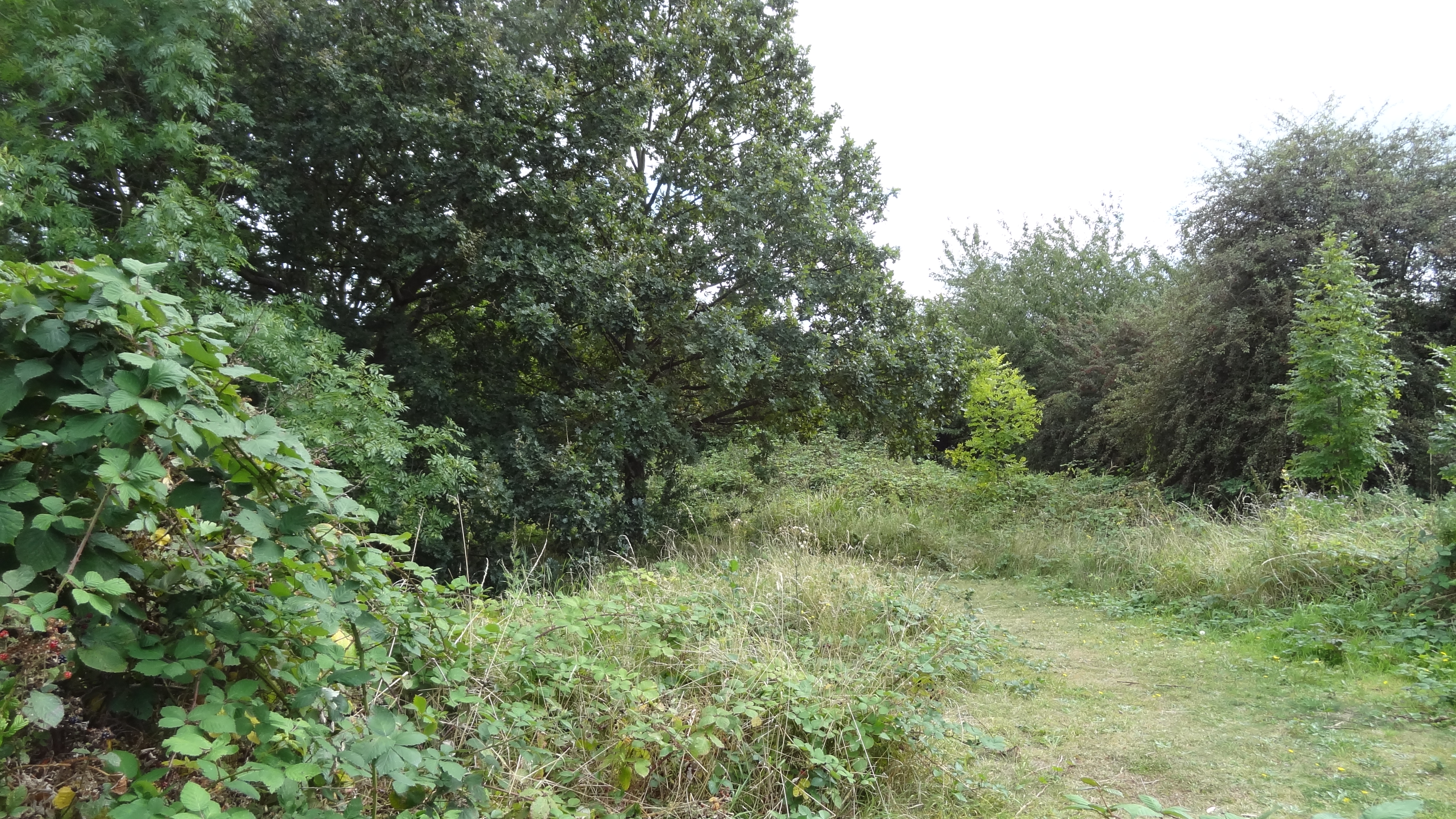
View of Barfield Allotments Nature Park from playground

Barfield Allotments Nature Park is a small Site of Local Importance for Nature Conservation in Whetstone in the London Borough of Barnet. It was formerly used as allotments, and when these were abandoned there were plans to turn it into a formal play area, but this met with local opposition when slow worms and common lizards were found, showing its value for wildlife. A small playground was installed in the north-east corner, while the remainder became a wildlife site.

Some plum and apple trees remain from the time when it was allotments, but it has now changed from grassland to scrub. The site has been partially cleared to create a species-rich mosaic, and a native hedgerow has been planted along the boundary. A pond and marshy area have also been created for amphibians, taking advantage of a natural spring.

The entrance to the site is in the playground off Barfield Avenue, but there is no public access, apart from school parties by arrangement.

== See also ==
- Nature reserves in Barnet
