= Ashley Lane (Hendon) =

Coordinates: 51.6015°N 0.2170°W

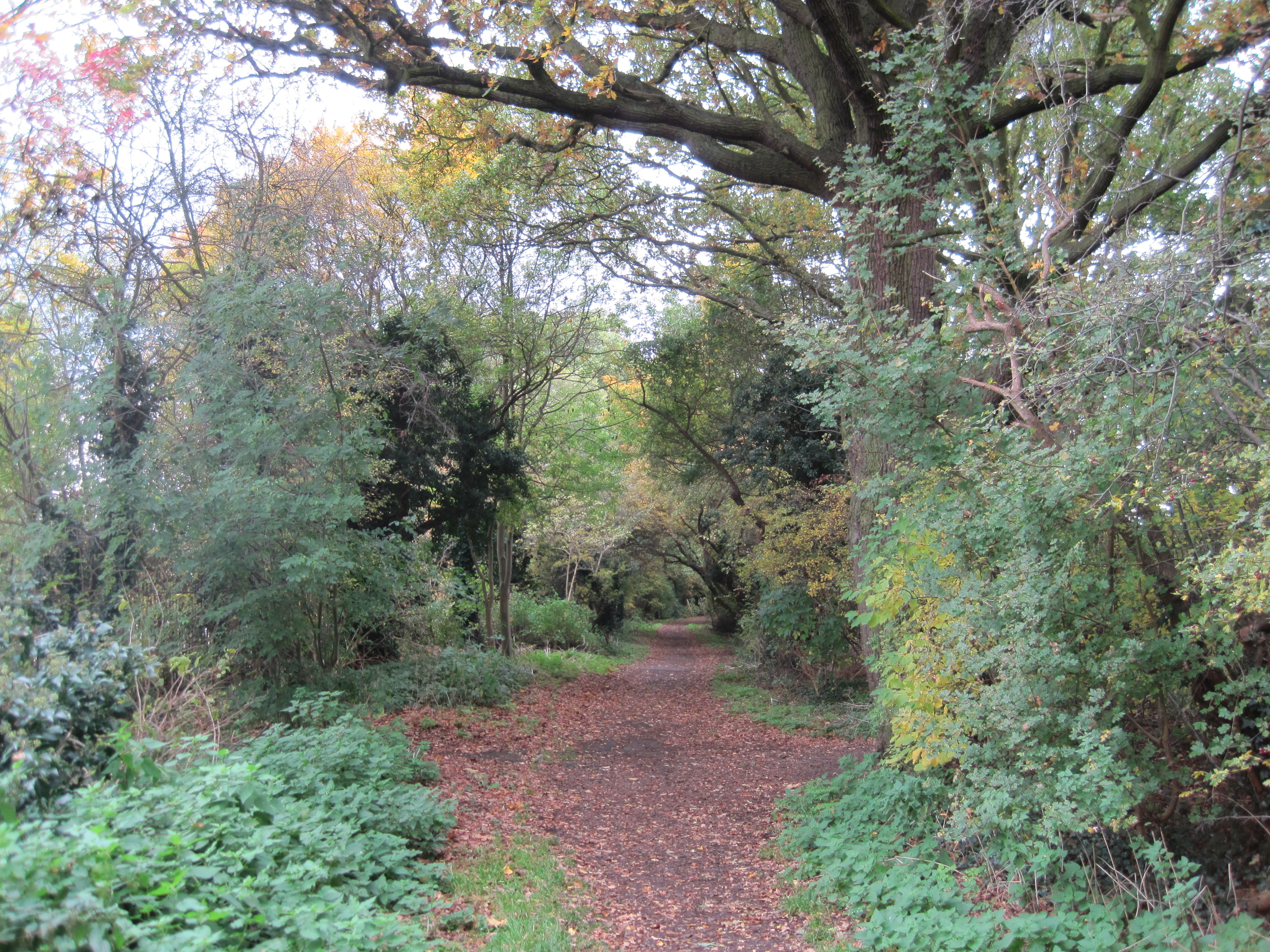
Ashley Lane

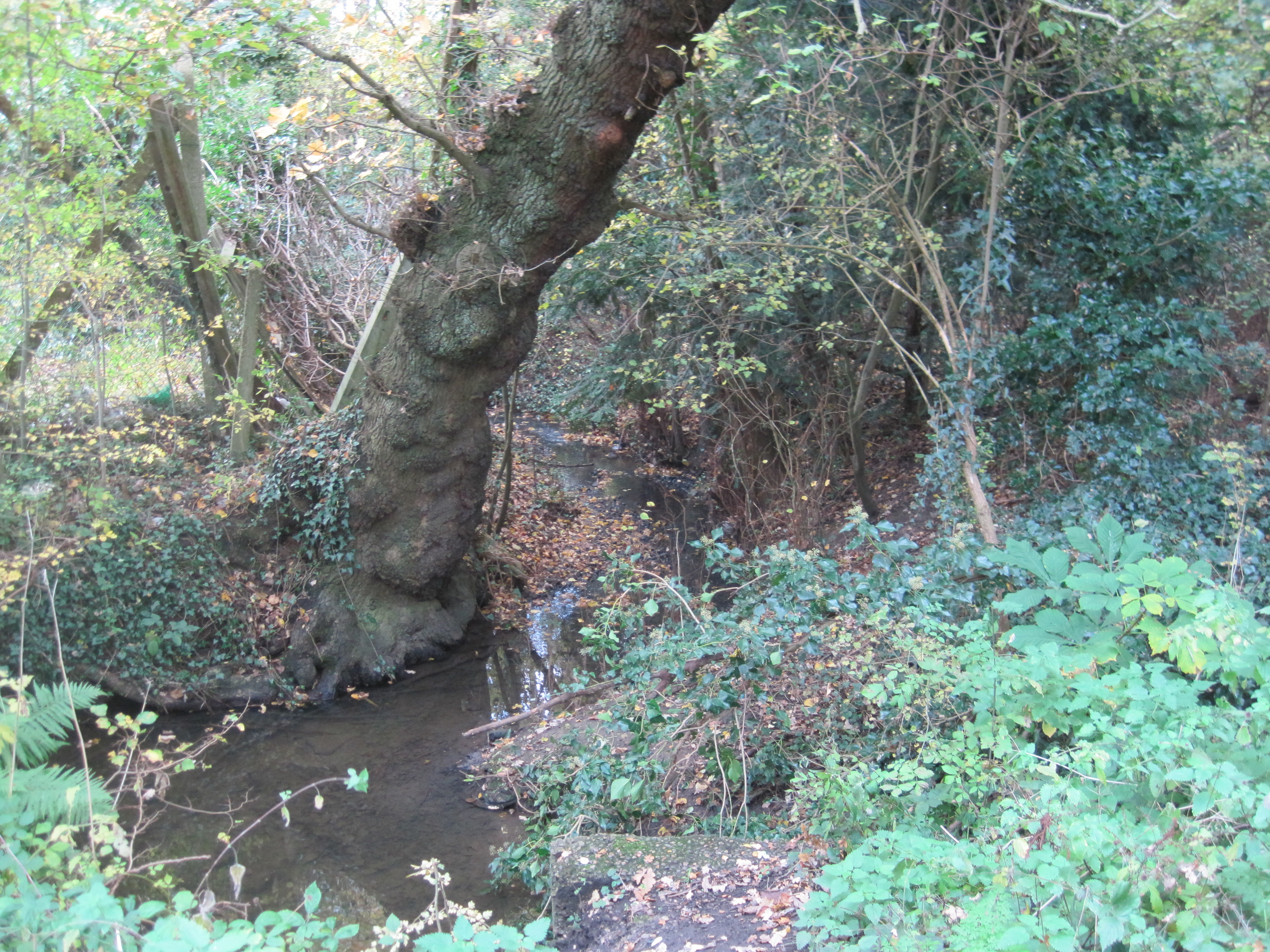
Stream in Ashley Lane

Ashley Lane is a one hectare Site of Borough Importance for Nature Conservation, Grade II, in Hendon in the London Borough of Barnet. It is over 400 years old, and was an important medieval road. Cardinal Wolsey travelled along it on his final journey to York in 1530. It is now a bridleway which runs between Hendon Golf Course and Hendon Cemetery.

The lane has retained its ancient hedgerows, which have developed into narrow belts of woodland. The main trees are Pedunculate oak and ash, together with some wild service-trees, and the hedge bottom flora include ramsons and bluebells.

A small stream, a tributary of Dollis Brook, crosses the lane.

The lane is the continuation of the public road Ashley Lane to Oakhampton Road.

== See also ==
- Nature reserves in Barnet
