= Copthall South Fields =

Nature reserve in Mill Hill, London, England

Coordinates: 51.602°N 0.233°W

Copthall South Fields is a six hectare Site of Local Importance for Nature Conservation, next to Fiveways Corner on the A1, in Mill Hill in the London Borough of Barnet.

It has several fields with scattered trees and ancient hedgerows. The trees are mainly oak, ash and field maple. The fields contain wild flowers such as meadow vetchling and meadow buttercup, and there are stands of tall herbs. A small plot of native woodland has been planted in the northern field by Watling Chase Community Forest.

There is access from Page Street, near Fiveways Corner, and from Champions Way.

A local residents group, the Copthall South Fields Conservation Group, aims to preserve and protect the fields.

== Gallery ==
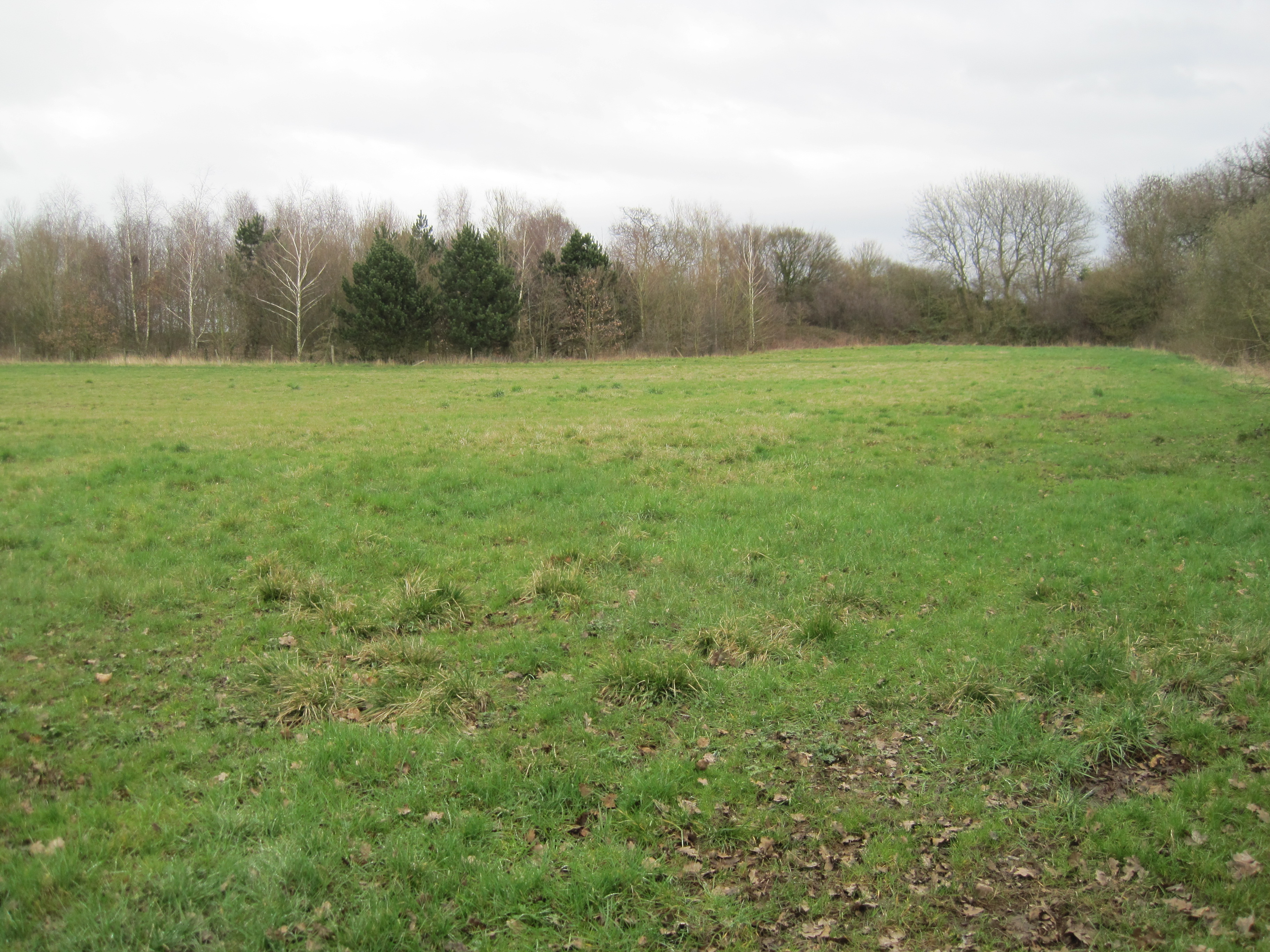

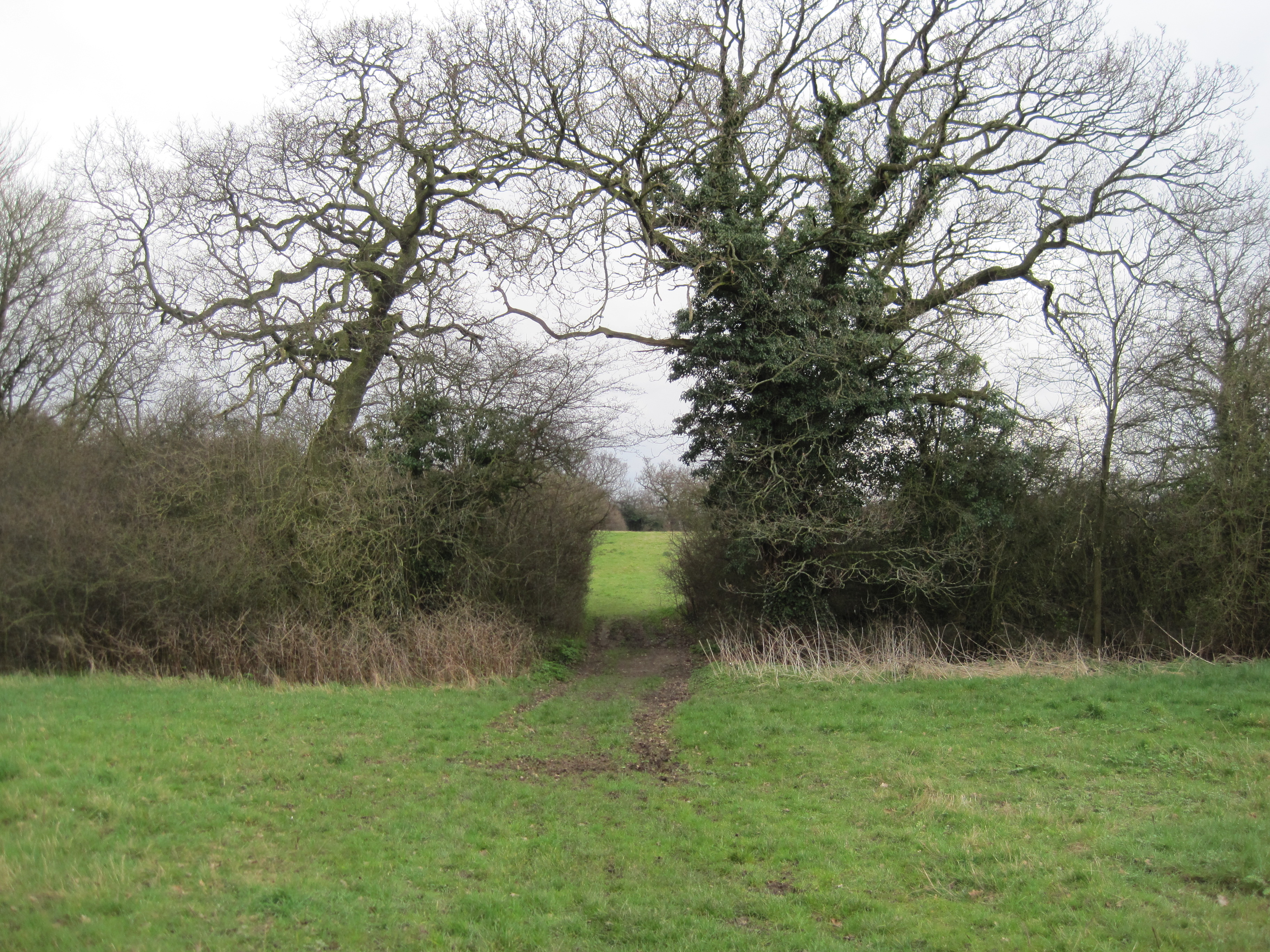

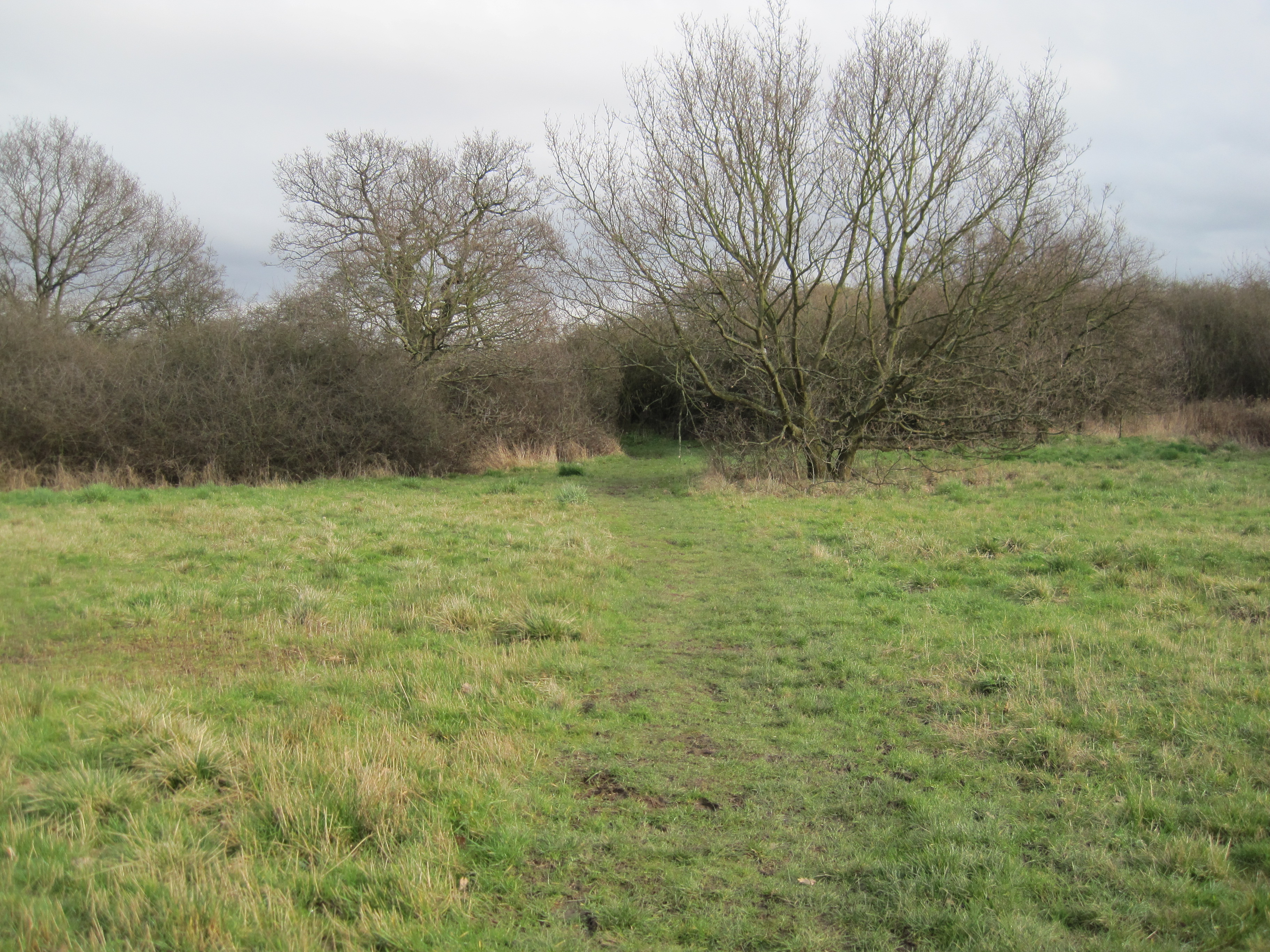

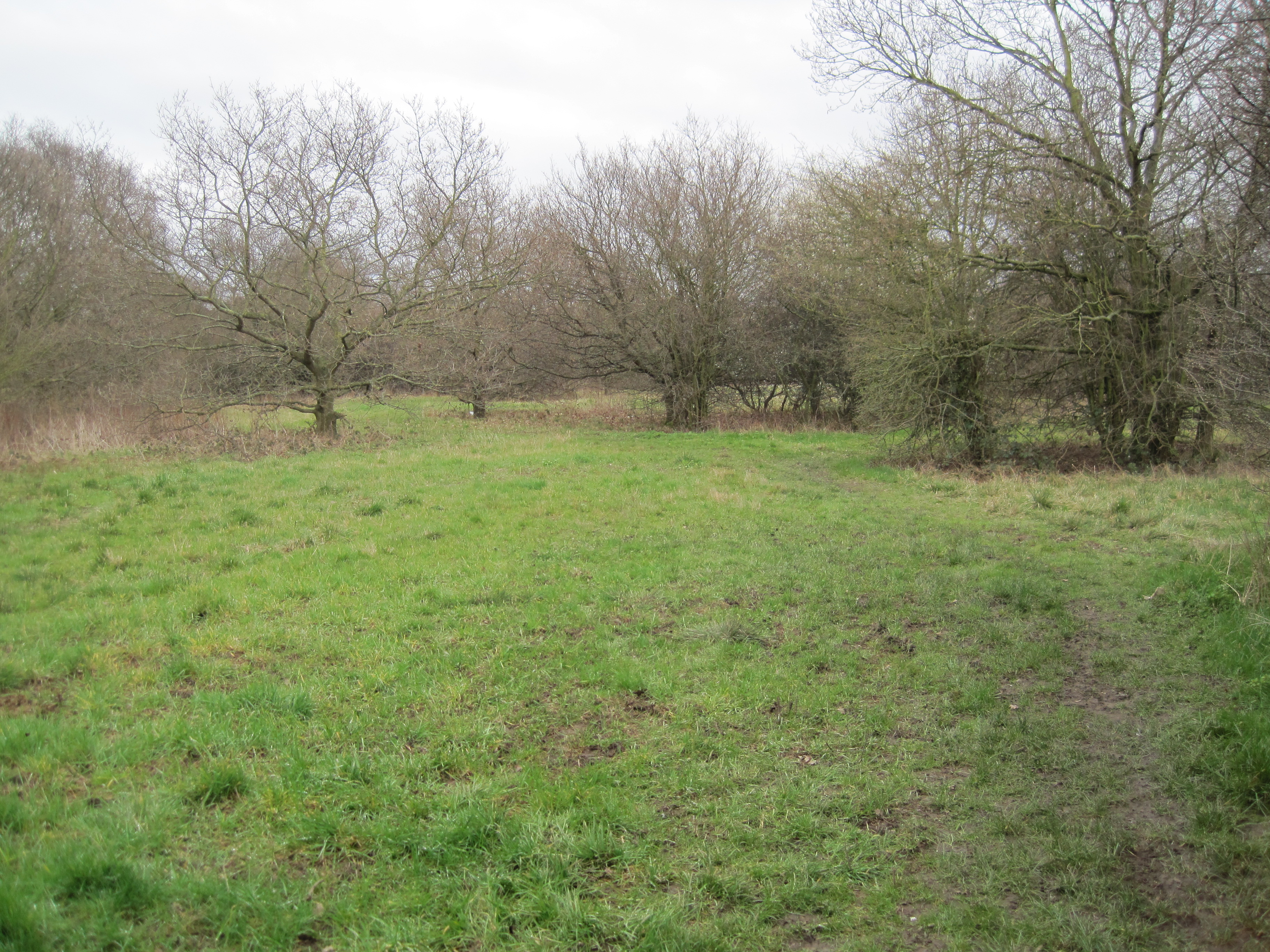

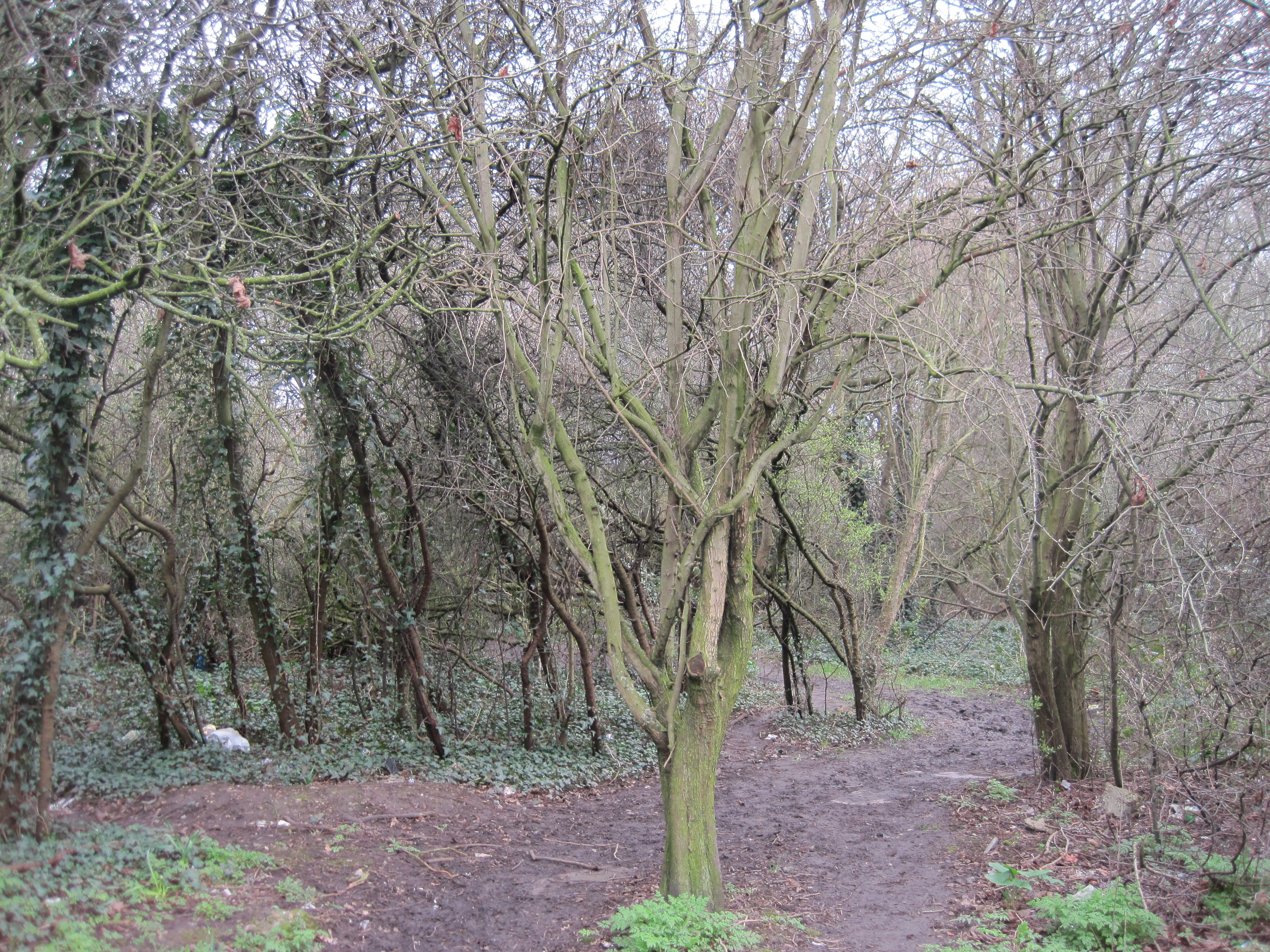

== See also ==
- Nature reserves in Barnet
