= Belmont Open Space, Cockfosters =

Public park in Cockfosters, London, England

Coordinates: 51.647°N 0.157°W

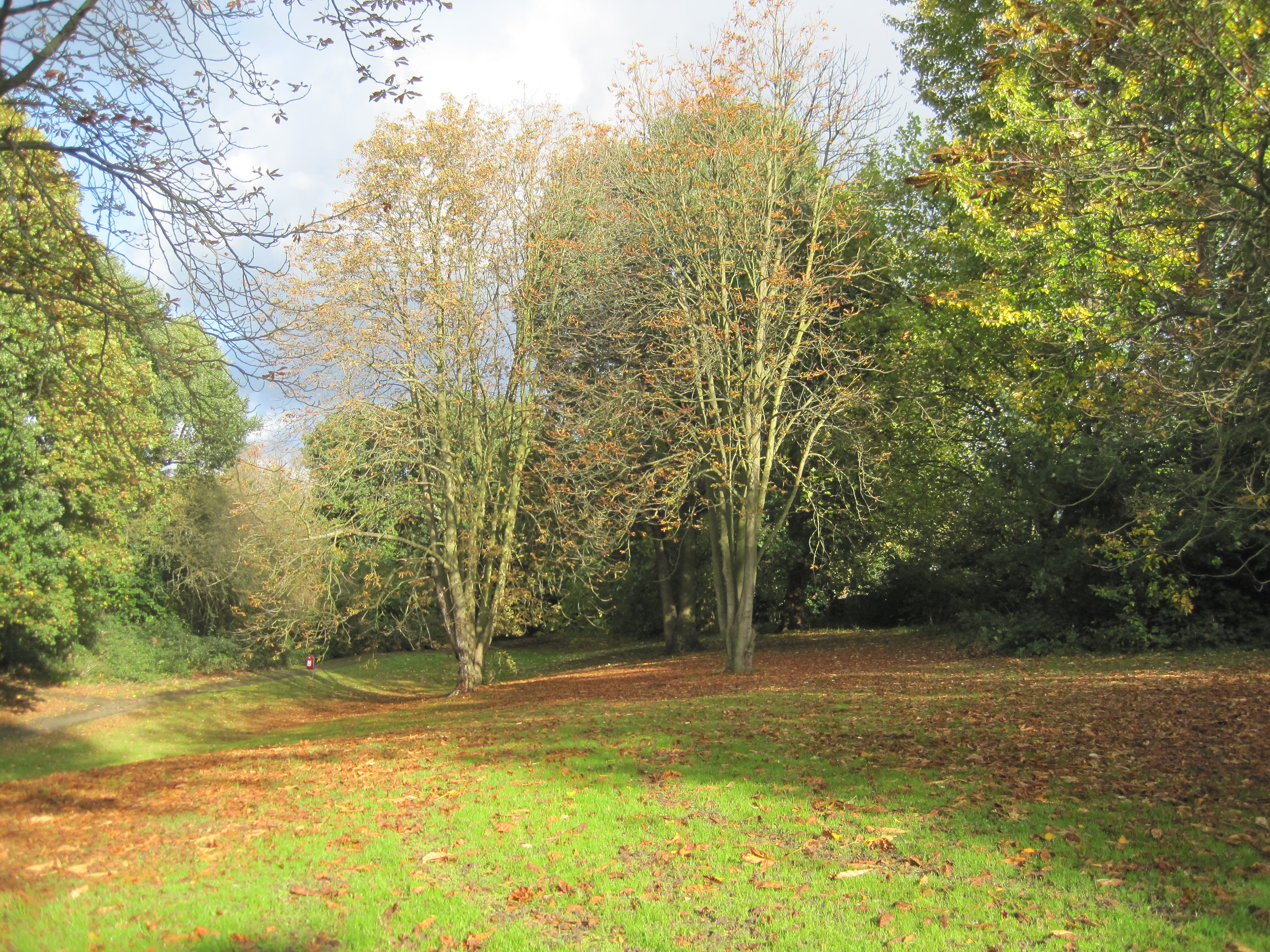

Belmont Open Space is a one hectare public park and Site of Local Importance for Nature Conservation in Cockfosters in the London Borough of Barnet.

It is a small, mainly grass area, behind local residential streets. It has a fair number of wild flowers, such as garlic mustard and cow parsley. Mature trees include oaks and horse chestnuts. The local RSPB has recorded an impressive list of birds, including green, great spotted and lesser spotted woodpeckers, sparrowhawks, and blackcaps.

Access is from Norrys Road and Carson Road.

== See also ==
- Barnet parks and open spaces
- Nature reserves in Barnet
