= Barnet Countryside Centre =

UK nature reserve

Coordinates: 51.658°N 0.216°W

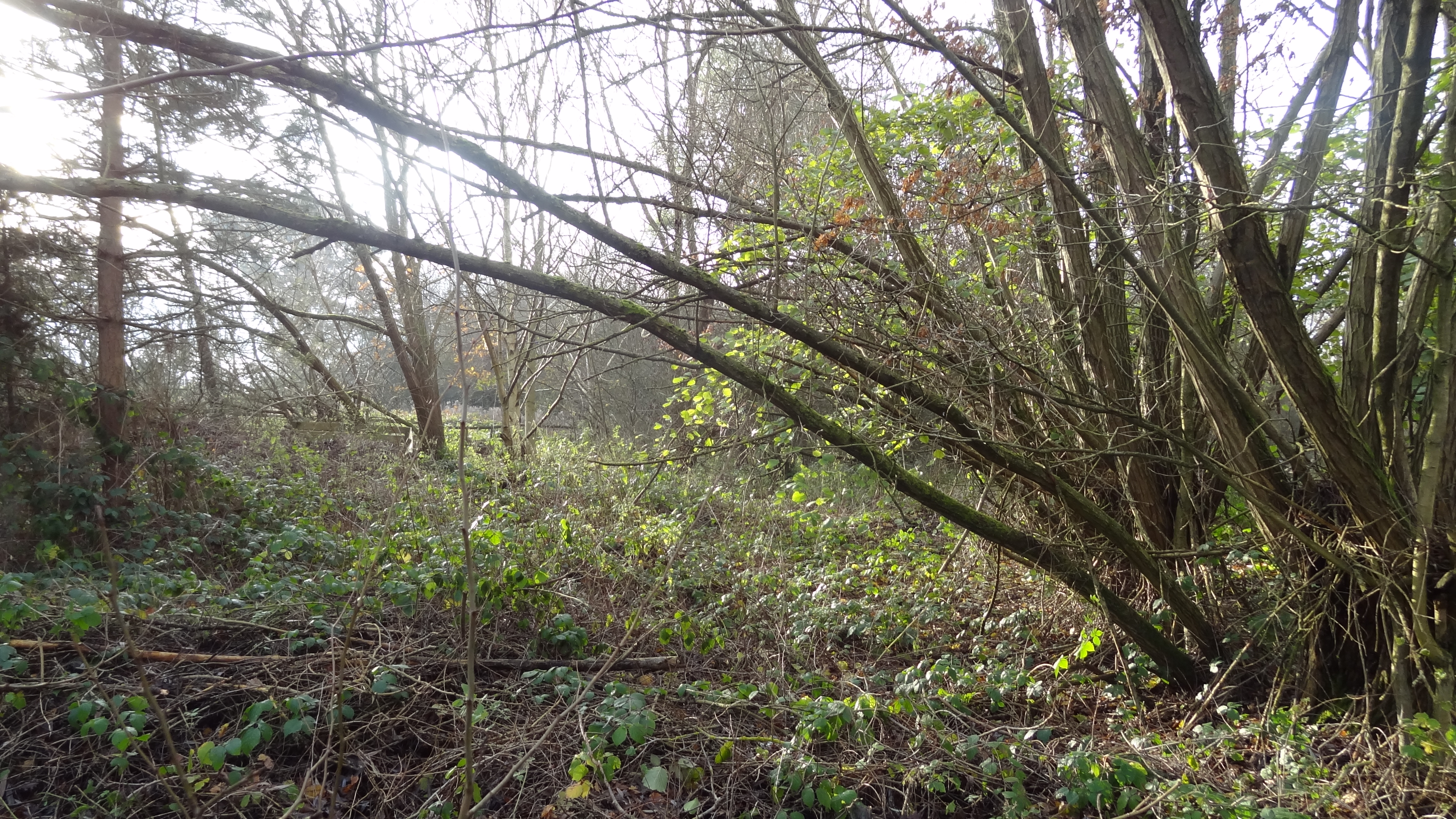
View from Byng Road

Barnet Countryside Centre is a 3.3-hectare (8.2-acre) Site of Local Importance for Nature Conservation in High Barnet in the London Borough of Barnet. It is run by the Friends of Barnet Countryside Centre as a nature reserve and to provide environmental education for schools.

The site has areas of native woodland which support a wide variety of birds. Several small ponds have frogs, newts and the ruddy darter dragonfly. More open areas have a good variety of insects including the small copper butterfly and Roesel's bush-cricket.

The site was formerly a playing field, and in 1975 it was established as an environmental education centre. In 2009 Barnet Council gave planning permission to the Noah's Ark Children's Hospice for the redevelopment of the site. The nature reserve is still maintained by the Friends, but there is no public access. It can be viewed from Byng Road and from a footpath between Byng Road and Cavendish Road.

== See also ==
- Nature reserves in Barnet
