= Glebe Lane Pastures =

Nature reserve in Greater London, England

Coordinates: 51.645°N 0.234°W

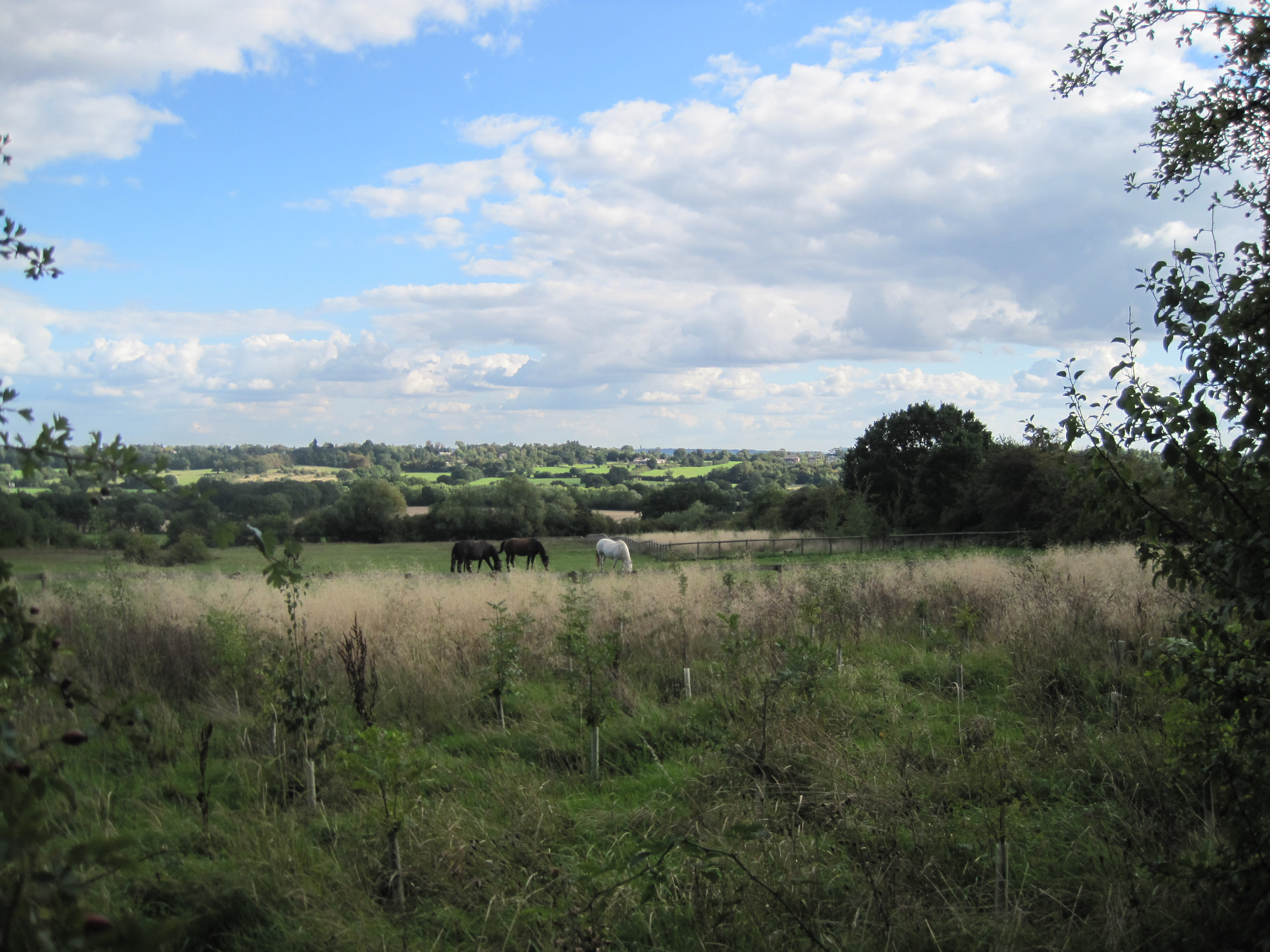

Glebe Lane Pastures is a Site of Borough Importance for Nature Conservation, Grade I, in Arkley in the London Borough of Barnet.

It consists of five fields off Glebe Lane, some managed for hay while others are grazed by horses. It contains flower-rich unimproved grassland which is dominated by Yorkshire Fog, with a good variety of other grasses, and Tufted hair-grass is dominant in damper areas. The most important feature of the site is the diversity of its old meadow plants.

The site is private, and can only be viewed from Barnet Road east of Glebe Lane.

== See also ==
Nature reserves in Barnet
