= Turner's Wood =

Nature reserve in London, England

Coordinates: 51.5722°N 0.1785°W

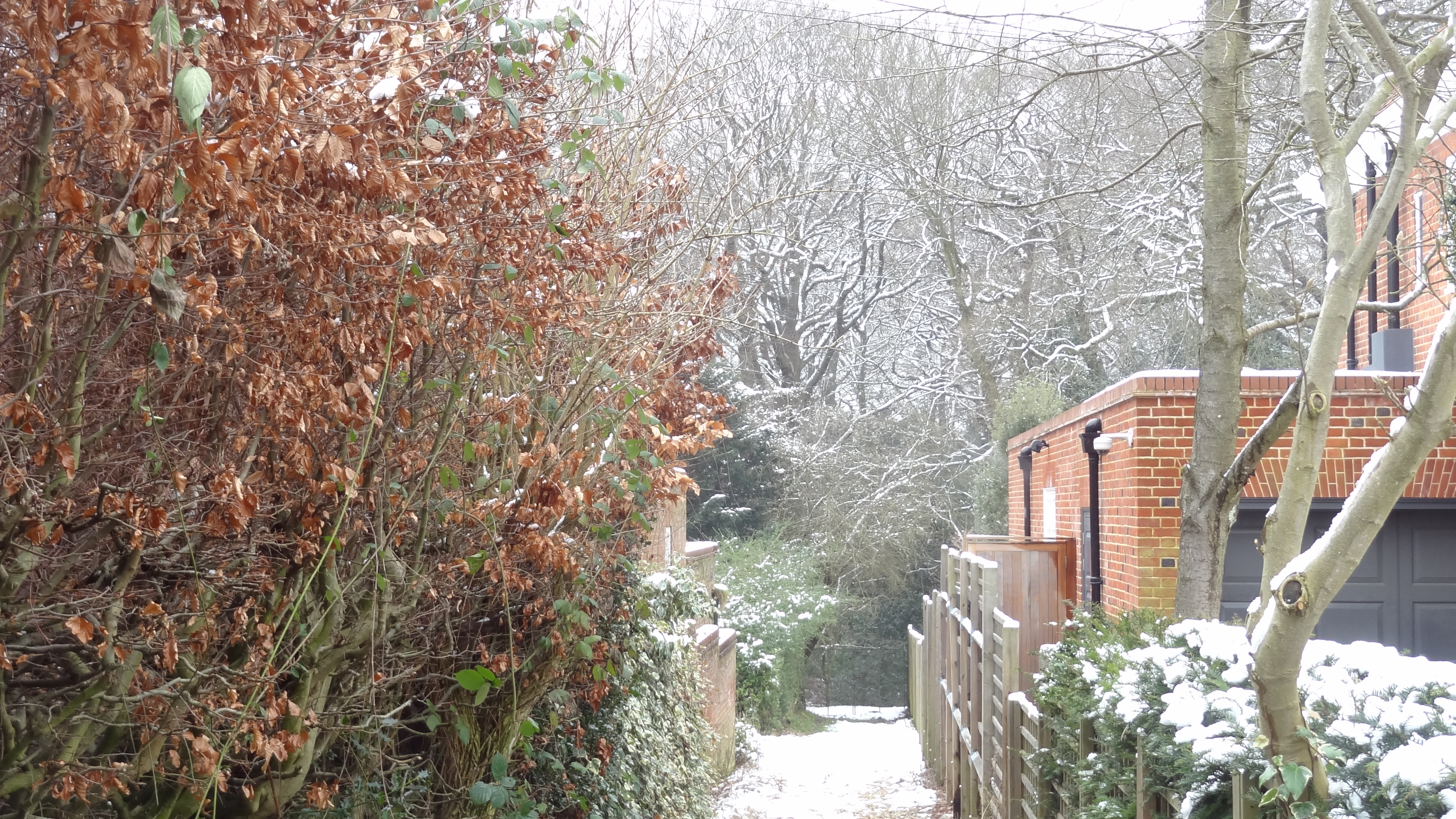
The entrance to Turner's Wood in Ingram Avenue

Turner's Wood is a 2.4-hectare (5.9-acre) Site of Borough Importance for Nature Conservation, Grade II, in Hampstead Garden Suburb in the London Borough of Barnet. It is designated as a private natural woodland and bird sanctuary.

Hidden behind houses between Wildwood Road and Ingram Avenue, the wood is a surviving fragment of Bishops Wood, which was part of the Bishop of London's medieval estate. In Victorian times it was a woodland pleasure garden, but it is now managed for nature conservation, especially for birds, by a company set up for the purpose by the residents of neighbouring properties in 1965.

Several small streams go through the site, tributaries of Decoy Brook, itself a tributary of the River Brent. The tree canopy is mainly sessile oak, with some pedunculate, hornbeam, sycamore and a few wild service-trees. There is a rich variety of species in the understorey, including rowan, Midland hawthorn and hazel. In the spring there are carpets of bluebells. Birds include coal tits, nuthatch and green and great spotted woodpeckers, while tawny owls and kestrels have bred on the site.

There is no public access, and the entrance in Ingram Avenue is normally padlocked.

== See also ==
- Nature reserves in Barnet
