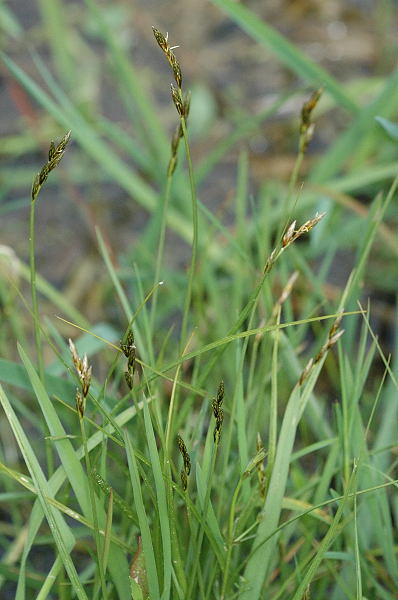

Conservation status
- Least Concern (IUCN 3.1)

Scientific classification
- Kingdom: Plantae
- Clade: Tracheophytes
- Clade: Angiosperms
- Clade: Monocots
- Clade: Commelinids
- Order: Poales
- Family: Cyperaceae
- Genus: Carex
- Subgenus: Carex subg. Vignea
- Section: Carex sect. Ovales
- Species: C. leporina

Binomial name
- Carex leporina L.

Synonyms
- Carex tracyi; Carex ovalis Gooden.

= Carex leporina =

Species of grass-like plant

Carex leporina is a species of sedge known in the British Isles as oval sedge and in North America as eggbract sedge. It is native to Eurasia and eastern and western North America, where it grows in seasonally wet habitat, such as meadows and fields. This sedge produces many thin stems and narrow leaves. The inflorescence is an open cluster of several flower spikes. The pistillate flower has a reddish or brownish bract with a gold center and white tip.
