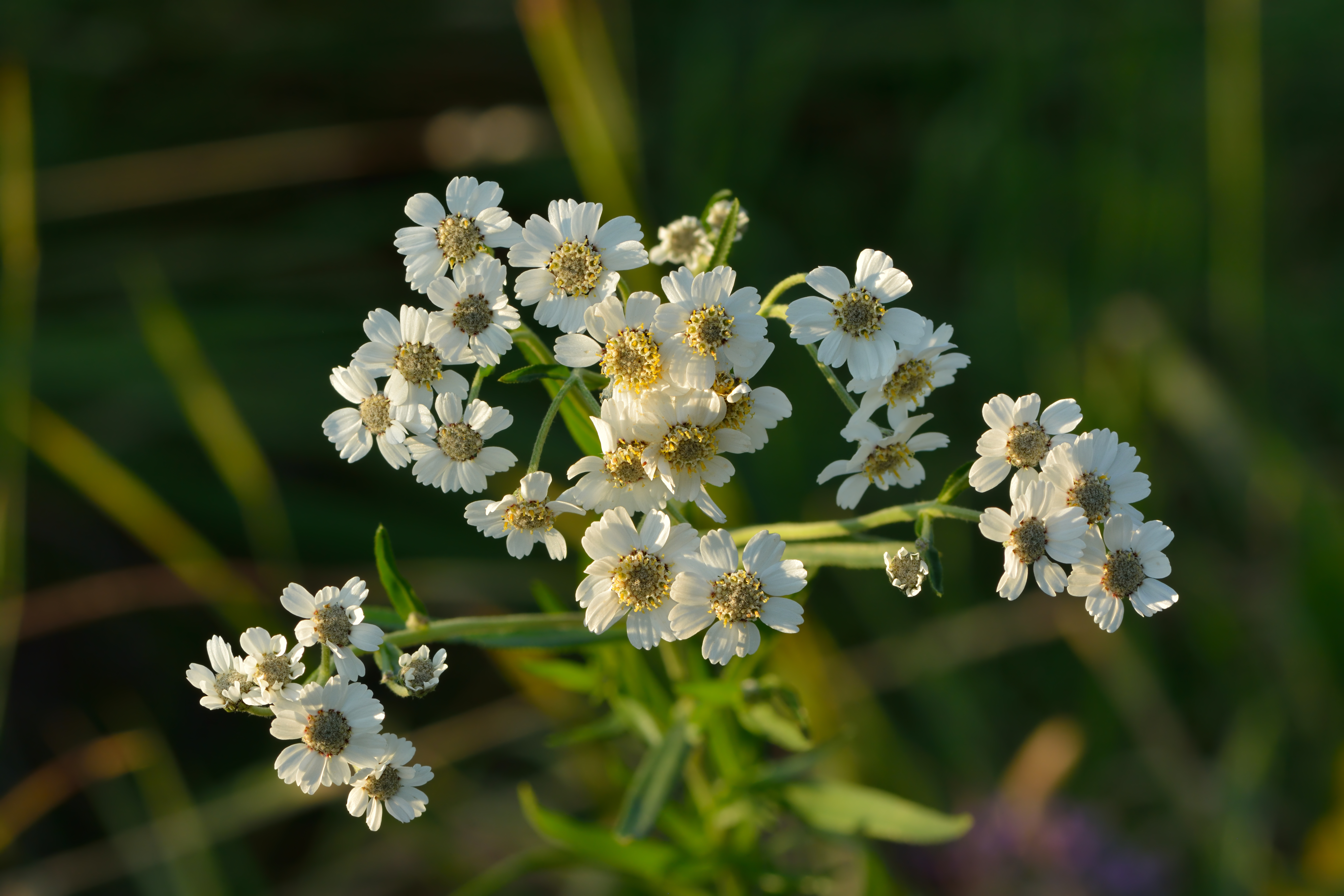

Scientific classification
- Kingdom: Plantae
- Clade: Tracheophytes
- Clade: Angiosperms
- Clade: Eudicots
- Clade: Asterids
- Order: Asterales
- Family: Asteraceae
- Genus: Achillea
- Species: A. ptarmica

Binomial name
- Achillea ptarmica L.

Synonyms
- Synonymy: Achillea acuminata Freyn 1895 not (Ledeb.) Sch.Bip. 1855; Achillea dracunculoides Desf.; Achillea fragilis Balb. ex DC.; Achillea grandis Fisch. ex Herd; Achillea ircutiana Sch.Bip.; Achillea lenensis Turcz. ex DC.; Achillea leucanthema Pers.; Achillea linearis Steud.; Achillea maxima Heimerl; Achillea multiplex P.Renault; Achillea partheniflora Fisch. ex Herder; Achillea serrulata Hornem.; Achillea sylvestris Gray; Alitubus pyrenaicus Dulac; Chamaemelum ptarmica (L.) E.H.L.Krause; Chrysanthemum ptarmicifolium Puschk. ex Willd.; Ptarmica vulgaris Blakw. ex DC.

= Achillea ptarmica =

Sneezewort

Species of flowering plant

Achillea ptarmica is a Eurasian species of herbaceous perennial flowering plant in the genus Achillea. Common names include the sneezewort, sneezeweed, bastard pellitory, European pellitory, fair-maid-of-France, goose tongue, sneezewort yarrow, wild pellitory, and white tansy.

== Description ==
Achillea ptarmica has loose clusters of showy white composite flower heads that bloom from June to August. Its dark green leaves have finely toothed margins. Like many other plants, the sneezewort's pattern of development displays the Fibonacci sequence.

== Etymology ==
The name ptarmica comes from the Greek word ptairo (=sneeze) and means 'causes sneezing'.

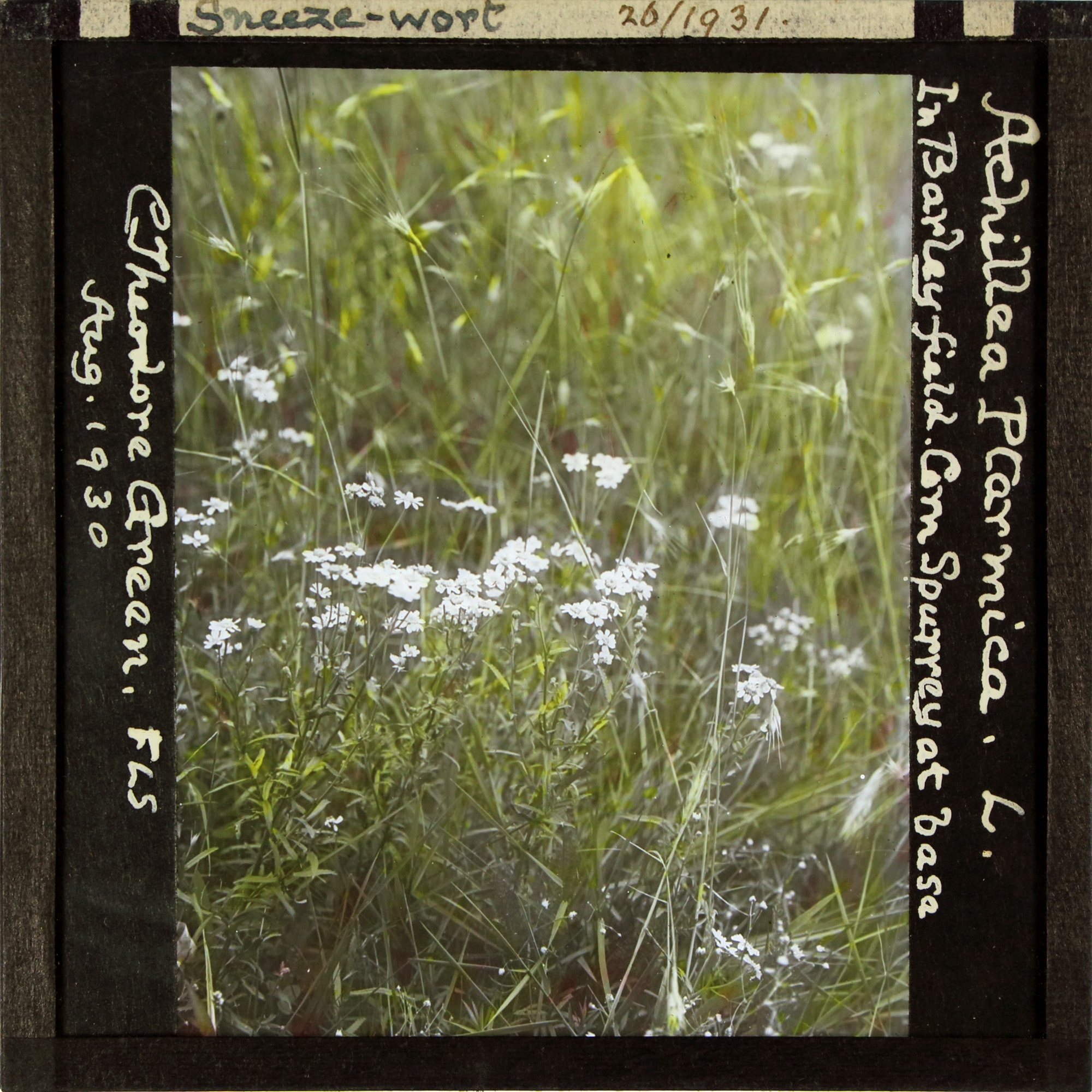
Image of sneeze-wort for magic lantern, by Theodore Green.

== Distribution and habitat ==
It is native to Europe and western Asia. It is widespread across most of Europe and naturalized in scattered places in North America.

== Uses ==
The leaves can be eaten raw or cooked. The leaves are used as an insect repellent. The plant yields an essential oil that is used in herbal medicine. When chewed, the plant produces a numbing, tingling effect in the mouth, comparable to that of Sichuan pepper. For this reason, it is sometimes used in herbal medicine to relieve toothache or ulcers, and as a culinary herb.

== Cultivation ==
This is a hardy, drought-tolerant plant that prefers full sun and moist but well-drained soil. Propagation is by sowing seed or division in spring. It will tolerate hot, humid summers, and drought.
