= Arkley (disambiguation) =

Arkley may refer to multiple articles:

- Arkley, a small village in the London Borough of Barnet
- The Arkley (automobile), an English vehicle
- Howard Arkley (1951–1999), an Australian painter
- Arkley Lane and Pastures, a nature reserve in Arkley
- Arkley South Field, a nature reserve in Arkley

== See also ==
- Arkie Whiteley (born 1964), daughter of Australian painter Brett Whiteley
- Arkle (1957–1970), an Irish racehorse
