= James Ravenscroft =

James Ravenscroft may refer to:

- James Ravenscroft (cricketer)
- James Ravenscroft (philanthropist)
