= Arkley =

Suburban village in London, England

Coordinates: 51.6477°N 0.2311°W

- Village
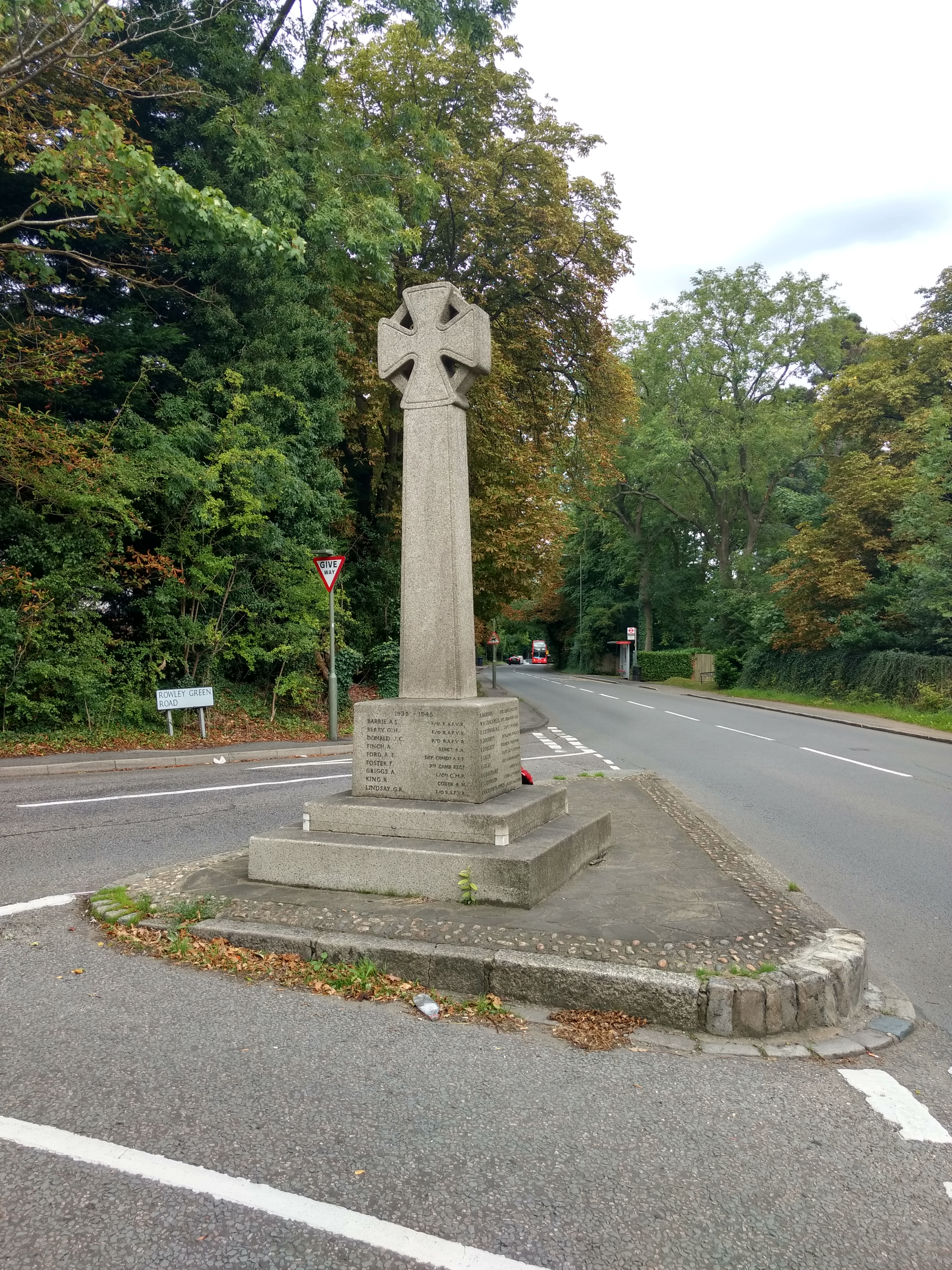
- Arkley War Memorial

- Location within Greater London
- OS grid reference: TQ225955
  - Charing Cross: 10.6 mi (17.1 km) SSE
- London borough: Barnet
- Ceremonial county: Greater London
- Region: London
- Country: England
- Sovereign state: United Kingdom
- Post town: BARNET
- Postcode district: EN5
- Post town: LONDON
- Postcode district: NW7
- Dialling code: 020
- Police: Metropolitan
- Fire: London
- Ambulance: London
- UK Parliament: Chipping Barnet
- London Assembly: Barnet and Camden

Arkley is a village in Greater London, England, within the London Borough of Barnet. It is located 10.6 miles (17.1 km) north-northwest of Charing Cross.

It consists of a long village strung out between Barnet and Stirling Corner, and composed of the ancient hamlets of Barnet Gate, Rowley Green and Arkley. At 482 feet (147 m) above sea level, Arkley is one of the highest points in London.

== History ==
Arkley (parish) population
1901	483
1911	494
1921	959
1931	1,929
1941	war #
1951	7,536
# no census was held due to war

=== Toponymy ===
The origins of the name Arkley are unclear; it is first recorded as Arkleyslond in 1332. The first element of the name appears to come from the Old English word (e)arc (or ark, meaning a chest, bin or other wooden receptacle), while the second element is from leāh, a woodland clearing or glade. –lond in the earlier name means "cultivated ground". The name Arkley would thus mean "woodland clearing by the ark or by the place where arks are made".

=== Historical background ===
A map showing Arkley parish in 1935

It is thought by some that Hendon Wood Lane was originally a minor Roman road. Certainly the name, "Grendel's Gate" (now Barnet Gate, and formerly known as "Grims Gate"), is associated with the monster from the Anglo-Saxon epic, Beowulf. This implies that the place was of modest importance as early as 1005. It may have been a centre of a small but significant community, founded on a woodland economy.

The area is later referred to in medieval documents as "Southhaw", and may have predated the settlement at Chipping Barnet. Certainly, Barnet manorial court was held here in the 13th century. From at least the early 19th century until the 1890s, Arkley was commonly known as "Barnet Common" or "West Barnet".

Prior to 1894, Arkley was part of the parish of Chipping Barnet. Under the Local Government Act 1894 parish and district councils were established, with new civil parishes created where the old parishes straddled the sanitary districts which formed the building blocks of the new districts. Chipping Barnet parish was therefore split into three separate civil parishes, with the part within Barnet Urban District retaining the Chipping Barnet name, the part within East Barnet Valley Urban District becoming Barnet Vale, and the rural part of the old parish becoming the civil parish of Arkley. The changes to parish boundaries took effect on 4 December 1894, ahead of the new district councils coming into being later that month. Arkley was part of Barnet Rural District. Arkley parish council formally came into office on 31 December 1894 and held its first meeting on 3 January 1895 at the village school in Arkley.

Arkley parish comprised the areas to the west and south of the town of Barnet, including areas such as Ducks Island and Underhill as well as Arkley village itself, which was on the north-western edge of the civil parish. After a boundary change in 1897 ceding some territory to Barnet Urban District, the civil parish of Arkley covered 830 acres (340 hectares). Arkley was absorbed into Barnet Urban District on 1 April 1905, at which point its parish council was dissolved and it was thereafter governed by Barnet Urban District Council. Whilst no longer having its own parish council, Arkley civil parish was not formally abolished until 1 April 1965, when Barnet Urban District was transferred from Hertfordshire to become part of the London Borough of Barnet in Greater London. Between 1901 and 1951 the population of the civil parish of Arkley rose from 483 to 7,536.

=== Second World War listening station ===
From 3 October 1940, Arkley became the home of the Radio Security Service. It was located in a large house, Arkley View off Arkley Lane. Its secret address was PO Box 25 Barnet. Other large houses in the area such as Rowley Lodge, the Lawns and Meadowbank were used as billets and as transmitting and receiving stations. Messages were intercepted from German spy networks and passed to Bletchley Park for decoding. Many local people worked first in Arkley and were then transferred to Bletchley Park.

=== Buildings ===
St Peter’s Church, which was designed by George Beckett, was built in 1840 as a private chapel at a cost of £5,000. It contains a wall tablet of its benefactor, Enosh Durant, who died in 1848. The chancel was added in 1898 and a Lady Chapel in 1921. After Durant's death the advowson was transferred to the rector of Barnet, and an ecclesiastical parish was formed in 1905.

Arkley Windmill was in use by 1806. It is marked as "corn" windmill on the Ordnance Survey of the 1860s. From photographs, it appears to have had only two of its original sails by the 1890s, by which time it may have been powered by steam. It ceased to be a functioning mill during World War I, and was restored in 1930, but not as a working mill.

The Gate Inn retains some of its original features. The sign, in the form of a hanging five bar gate, has an inscription which reads:

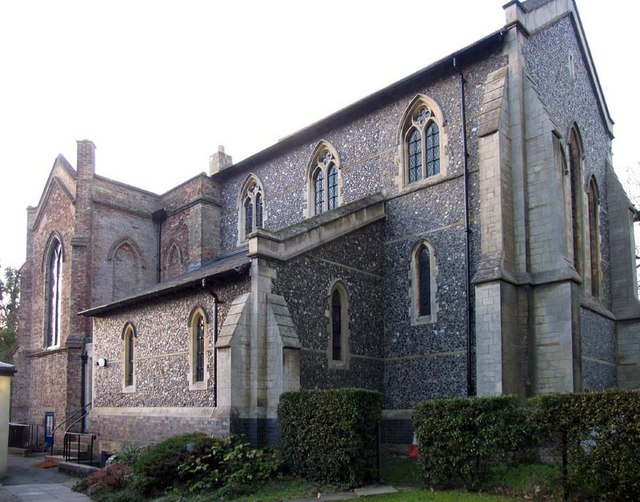
St Peter's Church, Arkley

This gate hangs high,

and hinders none;
refresh and pay,
and travel on

According to the old article displayed on one of its walls, the Gate was once visited by Anna Pavlova and her dancing troupe. Until the early 1960s a large tree grew up from the floor of the pub and out through the roof.

== Nature reserves ==
For its size, Arkley has more Sites of Importance for Nature Conservations than any other district in Barnet:

- Arkley Lane and Pastures
- Arkley South Fields
- Barnet Gate Wood
- Glebe Lane Pastures
- Rowley Green Common
- Rowley Lodge Field
- Totteridge Fields and Highwood Hill

In addition, Dollis Brook and Folly Brook, which are also Sites of Importance for Nature Conservation, rise in Arkley.

== Transport ==
=== Tube ===
Nearest:

- High Barnet – Northern line

=== Buses ===
- 107 – New Barnet Station to Edgware Station via Borehamwood
- 307 – Barnet General Hospital to Brimsdown via Barnet and Enfield
- 614 – Queensbury Station to Hatfield Business Park via Barnet (Monday to Saturday)
- 384 – Edgware to Cockfosters Station via Barnet (Quinta Drive)

== Local industry ==
Local clay has been exploited for brick-making and pottery over the centuries. During the 1950s, a 13th-century kiln at Dyke Cottage was excavated, revealing a large cooking pot, and 19th-century Ordnance Survey maps mark a "Tile Works". St Peter’s Church was built with local bricks. In the 1970s, John Britten produced a small racing car named the "Arkley" in the area.

== Sports ==
Arkley Golf Club was founded in 1909. The course was designed by James Braid and Harry Vardon.. On 29 November 1975, a Piper PA-23 Aztec aircraft piloted by retired Formula One racing driver Graham Hill crashed on the golf course, resulting in the death of all six people on board.

== Notable people ==
- Cyril Brine (1918–1988) – international speedway rider
- Tony Blackburn – radio disc jockey
- Graham Hill – F1 racing driver and twice World Champion, lived between Borehamwood and Shenley. He was killed when his private plane crashed on Arkley Golf Course in 1975.
- Mark Heap – actor
- Trevor Howard (1913–1988) – actor, lived for many years in Arkley with actress wife Helen Cherry, and also died there. His ashes were interred at St Peter's Church.
- Humphrey Lyttelton – musician
- W. E. Shewell-Cooper – organic gardener, used Arkley Manor for many years as a home and show garden
- Norman Wisdom – comedian
- Jermaine Jenas – footballer
- Bacary Sagna – footballer
- Marouane Chamakh – footballer
- Zayn Malik – musician, formerly of One Direction
- Perrie Edwards – musician, member of girlband Little Mix
- Theresa Villiers – MP for Chipping Barnet
