= Jesus Hospital =

Jesus Hospital may refer to

- Jesus Hospital, Barnet, an almshouse charity in Greater London, England
- Holy Jesus Hospital, a former almshouse in Newcastle upon Tyne, England
- Jesus Hospital, Bray, Berkshire, England, an almshouse
- Jesus Hospital, Rothwell, Northamptonshire, England, an almshouse
