= Saffron Green Meadows =

Public open space in Hertfordshire, England

Coordinates: 51.6636°N 0.2383°W

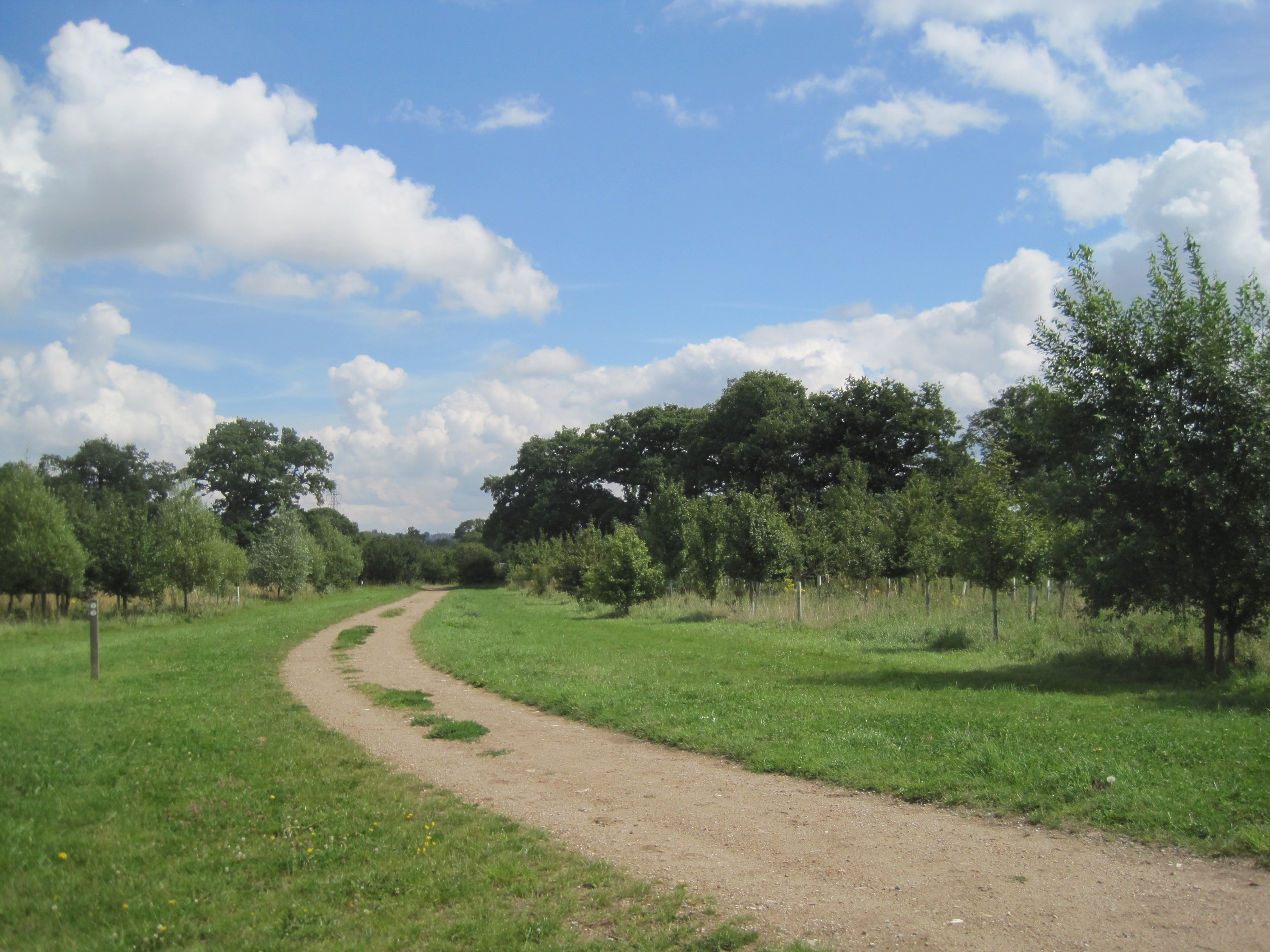
Path in Saffron Green Meadows

Saffron Green Meadows or Saffron Green Pasture is an area of public open space and farmland north of Arkley in Hertsmere, Hertfordshire, England. It is owned and managed by Hertfordshire County Council, and is part of the Watling Chase Community Forest and the London Green Belt.

In the late 1990s, the area was identified as suitable for environmental management as it had been untenanted for several years, and as rough grazing pasture it was a rich and scarce ecological habitat which also had recreational potential. An archaeological survey identified a pre-Roman landscape pattern, possibly dating back to the Bronze Age. In 2002–3, 4.5 hectares were planted as woodland, and a tenant was found to manage the land for grazing. The 42-hectare (100-acre) site had previously had no public access, but an area of 5.5 hectares is now public open space, with a bridleway which connects with Arkley Lane, a Local Nature Reserve in Barnet. There is also public access from Galley Lane.

A wide variety of wild species have been found on the site, and it is one of the largest wildlife sites in Hertsmere.

Mimmshall Brook, a tributary of the River Colne, skirts the site, and the radio masts of Saffron Green transmitting station are close by.

== Gallery ==
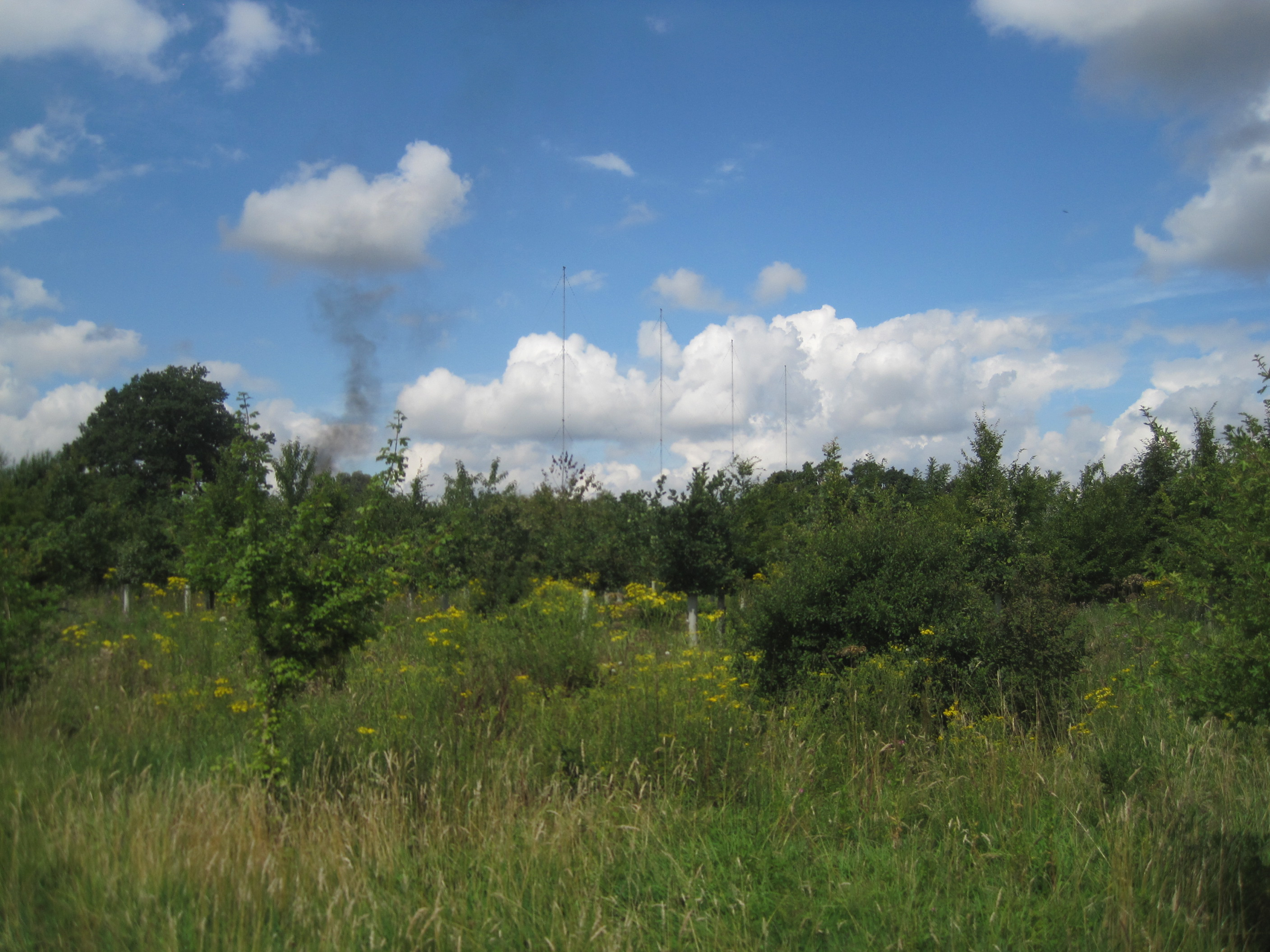
Meadows with radio masts in the distance

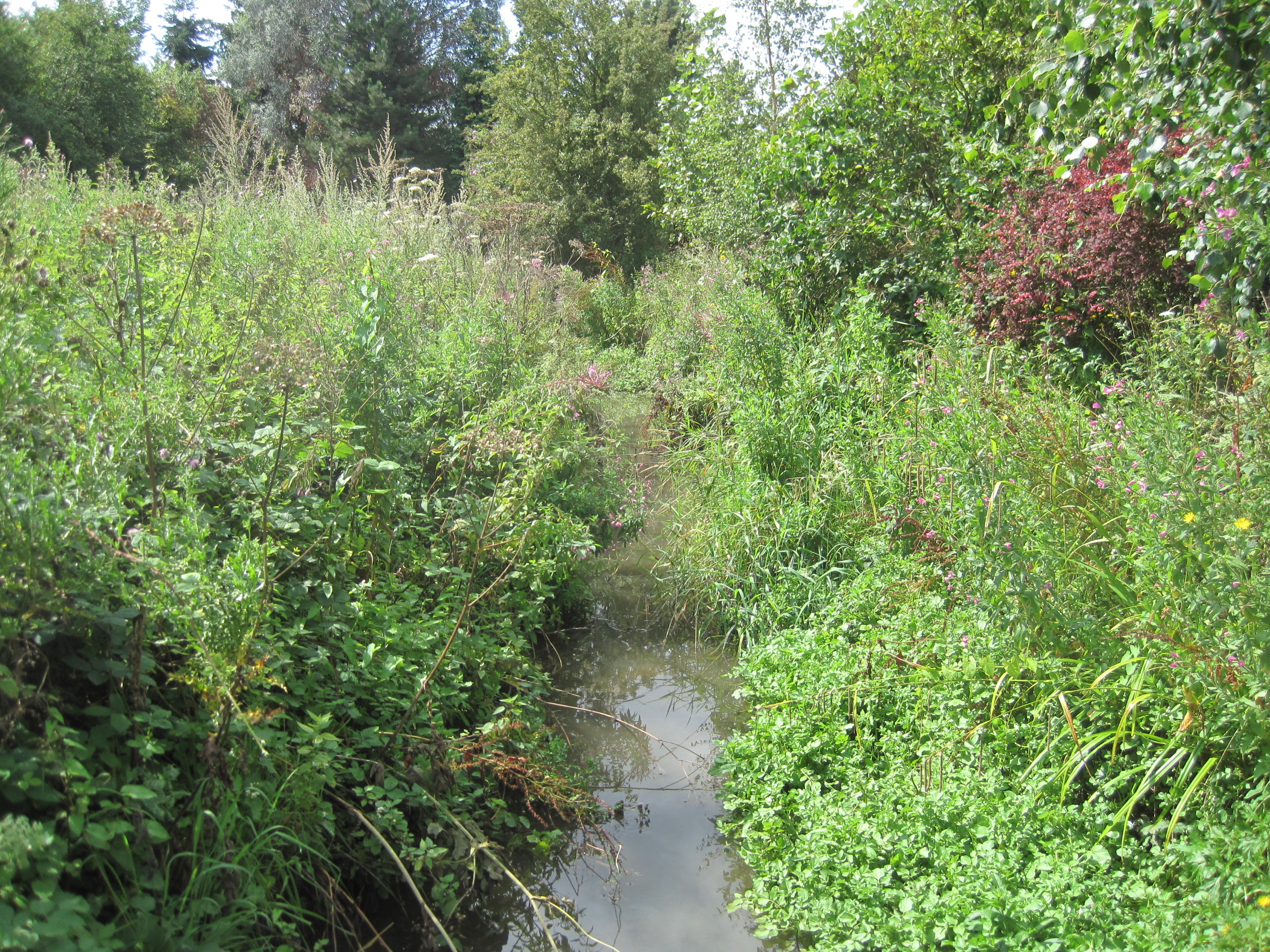
Mimmshall Brook
