= Barnet Common =

Area of common land south of Chipping Barnet, London

Coordinates: 51.644°N 0.224°W

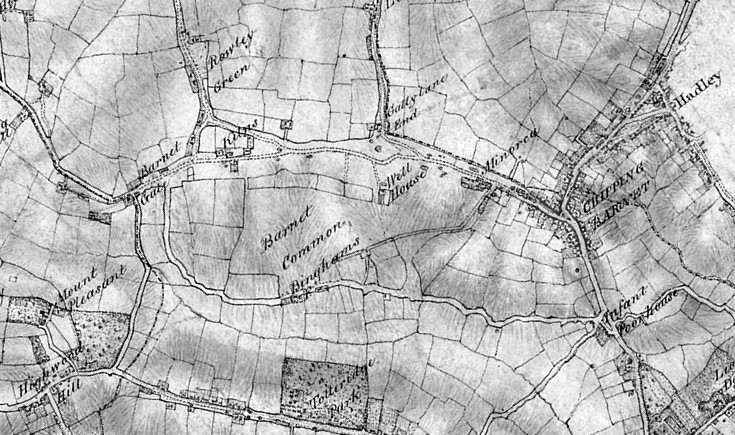
- Barnet Common (centre) on an 1805 map
- Interactive map of Barnet Common
- Nearest town: Chipping Barnet
- Established: 16th century
- Closed: 1815
- Designation: Common land

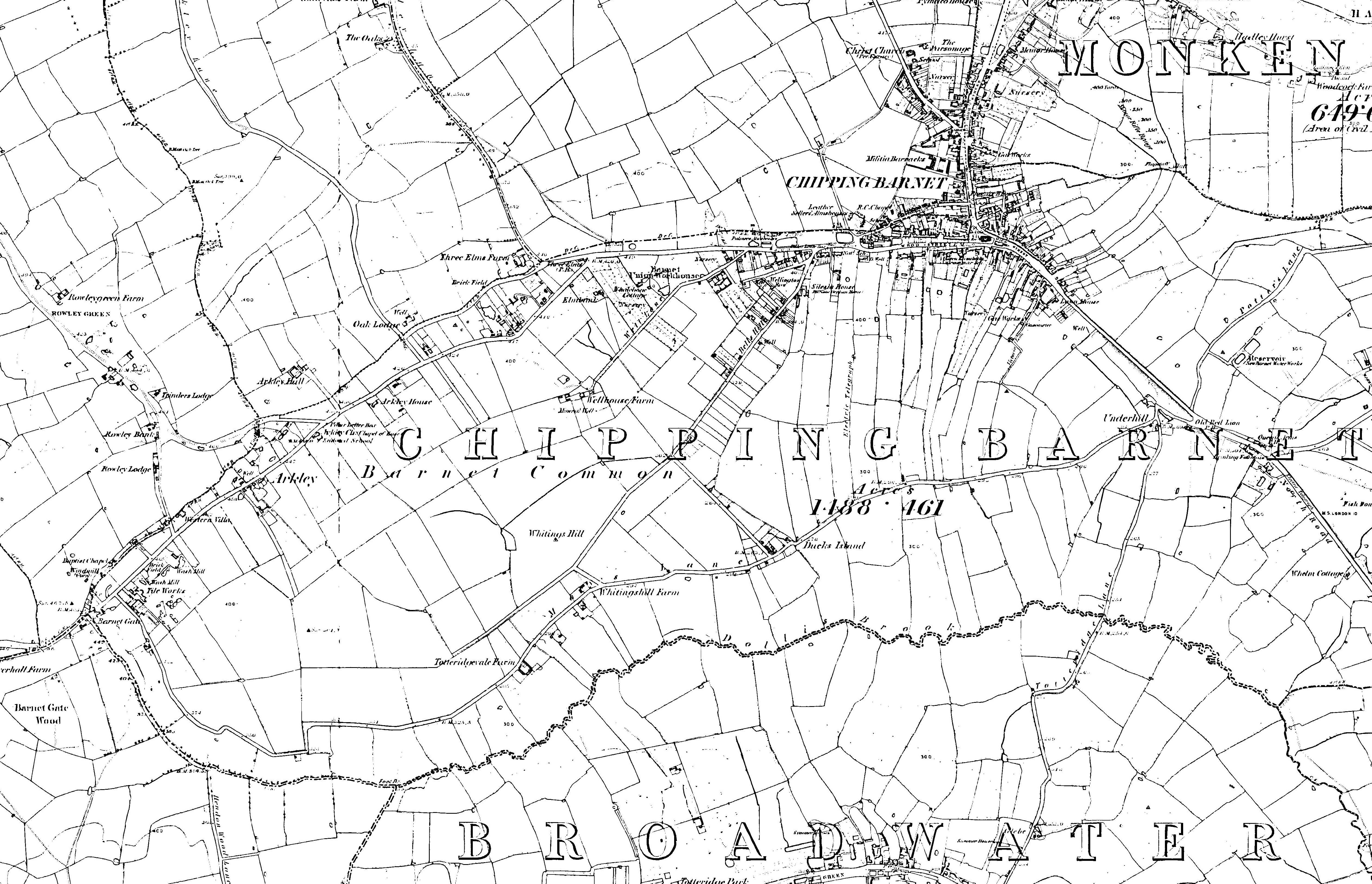
Barnet Common (centre) on an Ordnance Survey map published between 1873 and 1885

Barnet Common was an area of common land to the south of the town of Chipping Barnet in what is now north London. The Common was created after a wood was cleared in the 16th century and was mostly used by local people to graze their animals. It was the location of a Digger colony and of the Barnet Physic Well at which mineral water was consumed. Part of the Common was enclosed in 1729 and the rest in 1815, leading to development on the north and south sides, and later infilling.

== Extent ==
The Common was created by the clearance of a wood around the 16th century, possibly Southaw or Suthawe wood which at one time belonged to the Abbey of St Albans. It covered the area south of Chipping Barnet's Wood Street and Barnet Road, which run broadly east–west between the town centre and Barnet Gate, and went as far south as Ducks Island, Underhill, and the Dollis Brook.

== History ==
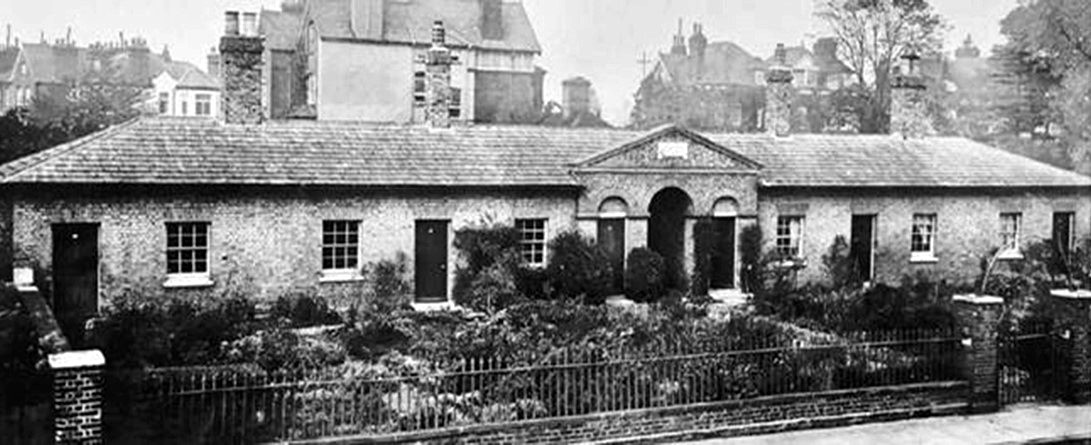
The original Eleanor Palmer almshouses in Wood Street

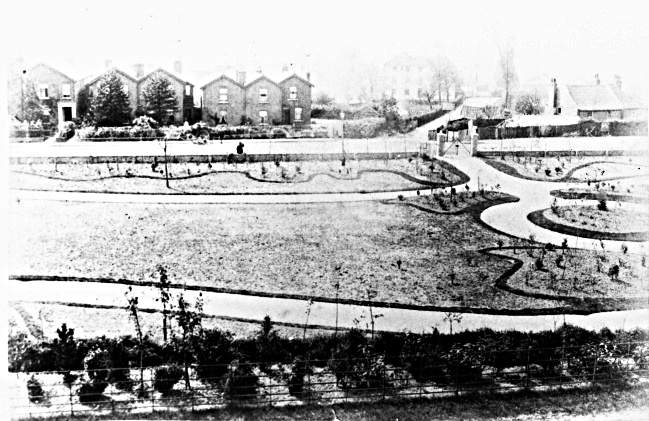
Ravenscroft Gardens, 1880

Barnet Physic Well became popular during the second half of the 17th century and there was a Digger colony on the Common in 1649. In the 18th and early 19th century the Common provided pasture for grazing horses which were traded at the Barnet horse fairs.

In 1729, 135 acres (55 ha) of the Common were enclosed by the Lord of the Manor, the Duke of Chandos. This prevented local people from grazing their animals on that part and in return for the loss of that right, the Duke set up a charity for the poor whereby some land was designated as "fuel land" and the rent from it used to buy winter fuel for the "deserving poor".

The remainder of the Common was finally enclosed in 1815 after which there was development on the north side of the Common in the Wood Street area, such as the six almshouses built by the Eleanor Palmer Trust in 1823 and the construction of the Barnet Union Workhouse in 1836–37 on Wellhouse Lane which led to the Physic Well. Housing was built on the south side at Ducks (or Duck) Island.

In 1876, James Thorne wrote in his Handbook to the Environs of London that the area around the former Common had "increased considerably" since the opening of the railway on the site of the former Barnet race course in 1872.

Later development in the area includes the construction of Barnet Hospital and its predecessors on the site of the former workhouse, and the creation of Barnet Recreation Ground in the 1880s from some of the last remaining common land. It was of a formal design with winding serpentine walks and was later renamed Ravenscroft Gardens after local philanthropist James Ravenscroft. Bell's Hill Burial Ground was opened in 1895.

== Barnet Physic Well ==
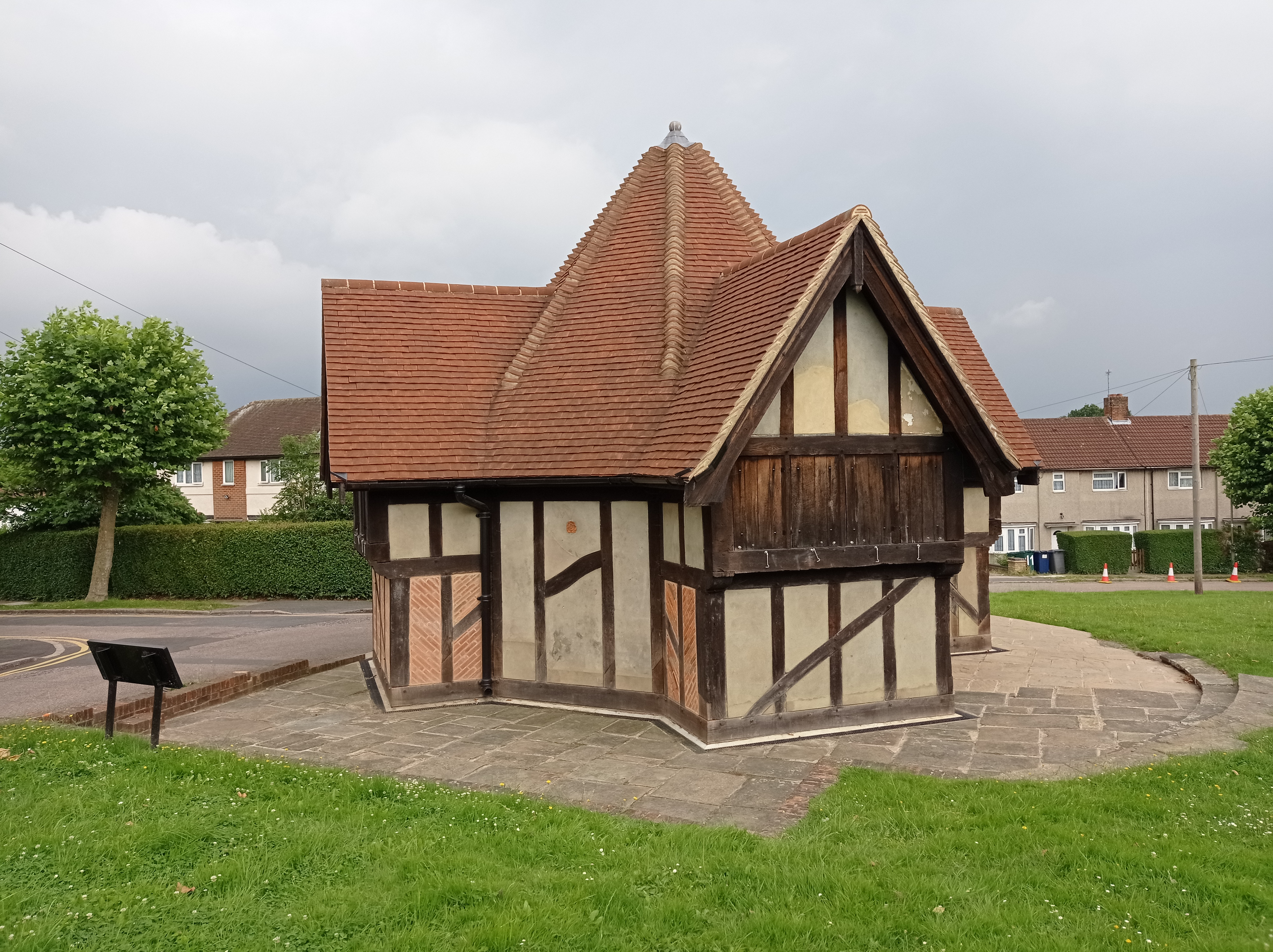
Barnet Physic Well, pictured in 2021 after restoration in 2018

The waters of the Barnet Physic Well, located on the Common, were recommended as a remedy for various medical complaints in William Camden's Brittania (1586) as "The Barnet Whey" but only became well known as a source of mineral water during the second half of the 17th century. In 1652 the well was described as producing "an excellent purging water" that worked as well as that of Epsom water but with half the quantity.

A well-house was built in 1656 and in 1661 the Well was described as "famous" by Joshua Childrey in his book Natural Rarities of England, Scotland and Wales. In 1662, Thomas Fuller in Worthies of England hoped that its waters would save as many lives as were lost in the Battle of Barnet, and Samuel Pepys recorded his visits in 1664 and 1667 in his Diary, drinking five glasses of the water on his first visit which caused him to need to urinate "seven or eight times upon the road" home. The Well was also mentioned by Daniel Defoe in his Tour of the Whole Island of Britain (1720s). It was popular into the 18th century but subsequently declined until being restored in the 20th century. A new Tudor-style well-house was built in 1937 which was restored in 2018.

The well has been listed Grade II on the National Heritage List for England since 1983.

== See also ==
- Monken Hadley Common
