= W. E. Shewell-Cooper =

British gardener (1900–1982)

- Shewell-Cooper and his wife in 1964 with his Order of Agricultural Merit award
- Born: Wilfred Edward Shewell-Cooper; 15 September 1900
- Died: 21 February 1982 (aged 81)
- Occupation: Gardener
- Spouse: Irene Ramsey Pennicott (m. 1925)

Wilfred Edward Shewell-Cooper (15 September 1900 – 21 February 1982) was a British organic gardener and pioneer of no-dig gardening. He wrote and published many books, including Soil, Humus and Health (1975), The Royal Gardeners (1952), Grow Your Own Food Supply (1939), and The ABC of Vegetable Gardening (1937). In 1966, he founded the Good Gardeners Association. For many years, his gardens at Arkley Manor were open to the public, allowing the results of his no-dig methods, indicated by a symbol featuring a robin resting on a spade handle, to be seen first-hand.

== Childhood and education ==
Shewell-Cooper was born in Waltham Abbey, Essex in 1900. His father, E. Shewell-Cooper, was a major in the Royal Artillery and was also the assistant superintendent of the gunpowder factory in Waltham Abbey. From there, the family moved to Blackheath, London, and then to Penarth, Wales. Before the outbreak of World War I, the family set sail on the Galaka for South Africa, where they lived in Rondebosch, now a suburb of Cape Town. While there, he went to school at Diocesan College. When he returned to England, he attended Monkton Combe School just outside Bath.

== Family and career ==
Shewell-Cooper married Irene Ramsey Pennicott in 1925. He was a prolific author of gardening books and together they wrote a cookery book called Cook What You Grow (1940). They had two sons, Ramsay and Jeremy.

Over the course of his life, Shewell-Cooper held a number of positions, some of which are listed below:

- Command Horticultural Officer, S.E. and Eastern Commands (1940–1948)
- Principal of the Thaxted Horticultural College (1950–1960)
- Fellow of the Horticultural Society of Vienna (1952)
- Director of the Horticultural Educational and Advisory Bureau (1960)
- Hon. Superintendent of the Swanley Horticultural College
- Horticultural advisor to the Warwickshire and Cheshire County Councils (1928)
- Hon. Treasurer of the Westbank House, Hextable (1937–1938)
- Garden editor of the BBC North Region

In 1964, Shewell-Cooper was appointed a Commander of the Order of Agricultural Merit by the French Government and given an award. The honour is the highest to be given by the French Government to a horticulturist.

== Arkley Manor ==
In 1960, Sir John Laing suggested that Shewell-Cooper move to Arkley Manor; this was his home until his death in 1982.

== Legacy ==
Ramsay Shewell-Cooper, who died in 2016, continued to promote his father's no-dig gardening approach and, as of 2008, a demonstration plot was to be seen at Capel Manor College in Enfield, in conjunction with the Good Gardeners' Association.

== Bibliography ==
Shewell-Cooper's published works include:

- The ABC of Vegetable Gardening (1937)
- The ABC of Fruit Growing (1938)
- Grow Your Own Food Supply (1939)
- Cook What You Grow (1940) with Irene Shewell-Cooper
- The Amateur Greenhouse (1940)
- The Royal Gardeners (1952)
- The ABC of Gardening
- The ABC of the Greenhouse
- The ABC of Flower Growing
- The ABC of Garden Pests and Diseases
- The ABC of Cloche Gardening
- The ABC of Flowering Shrubs (1953)
- The ABC of the Rock Garden and Pool
- The ABC of Bulbs and Corms
- The ABC of Soils, Humus and Health (1959)
- The Book of the Tomato (1948)
- Herbs, Salads and Tomatoes (1961)
- Town and City Gardening (1964)
- Cut Flowers for the House (1970)
- Compost Gardening (1972)
- Soil Humus & Health (1975)
- The Compost Fruit Grower (1975)
- The Compost Flower Grower
- Basic Book of Flower Gardening (1976)
- God Planted a Garden: Horticulture in the Bible (1977)
- Guide to Salads and Herbs
- Guide to Soil, Humus and Manuring
- Guide to Roses
- Guide to Dahlias
- Guide to Tomatoes
- Guide to Pruning Fruit Trees and Shrubs
- Guide to Carnations
- The Gardener's Diary
- Plants, Flowers and Herbs of the Bible (1989)

== See also ==
- Organic gardening
