= Rowley Green =

Coordinates: 51.6539°N 0.2479°W

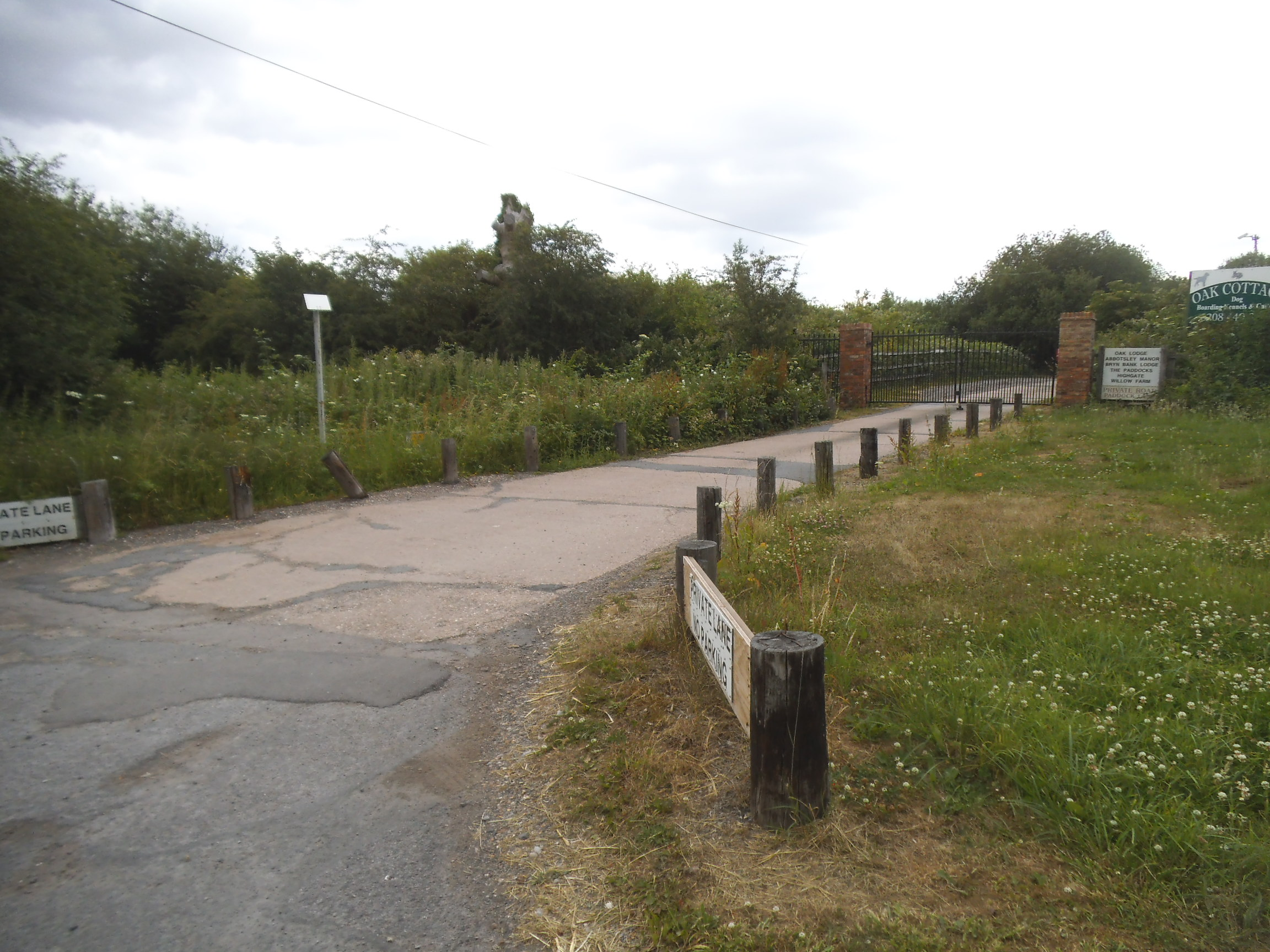

- Location within Greater London
- London borough: Barnet
- Ceremonial county: Greater London
- Region: London
- Country: England
- Sovereign state: United Kingdom
- Police: Metropolitan
- Fire: London
- Ambulance: London
- London Assembly: Barnet and Camden

Rowley Green is a hamlet in the London Borough of Barnet, north London, England.

It formed a civil parish of 1,176 acres (476 ha) called Rowley from 1935 to 1965.

It is the location of Rowley Lodge Field and Rowley Green Common open spaces.
