= St Peter's Church, Arkley =

Church in Arkley, London, England

Coordinates: 51°38′50″N 0°13′55″W

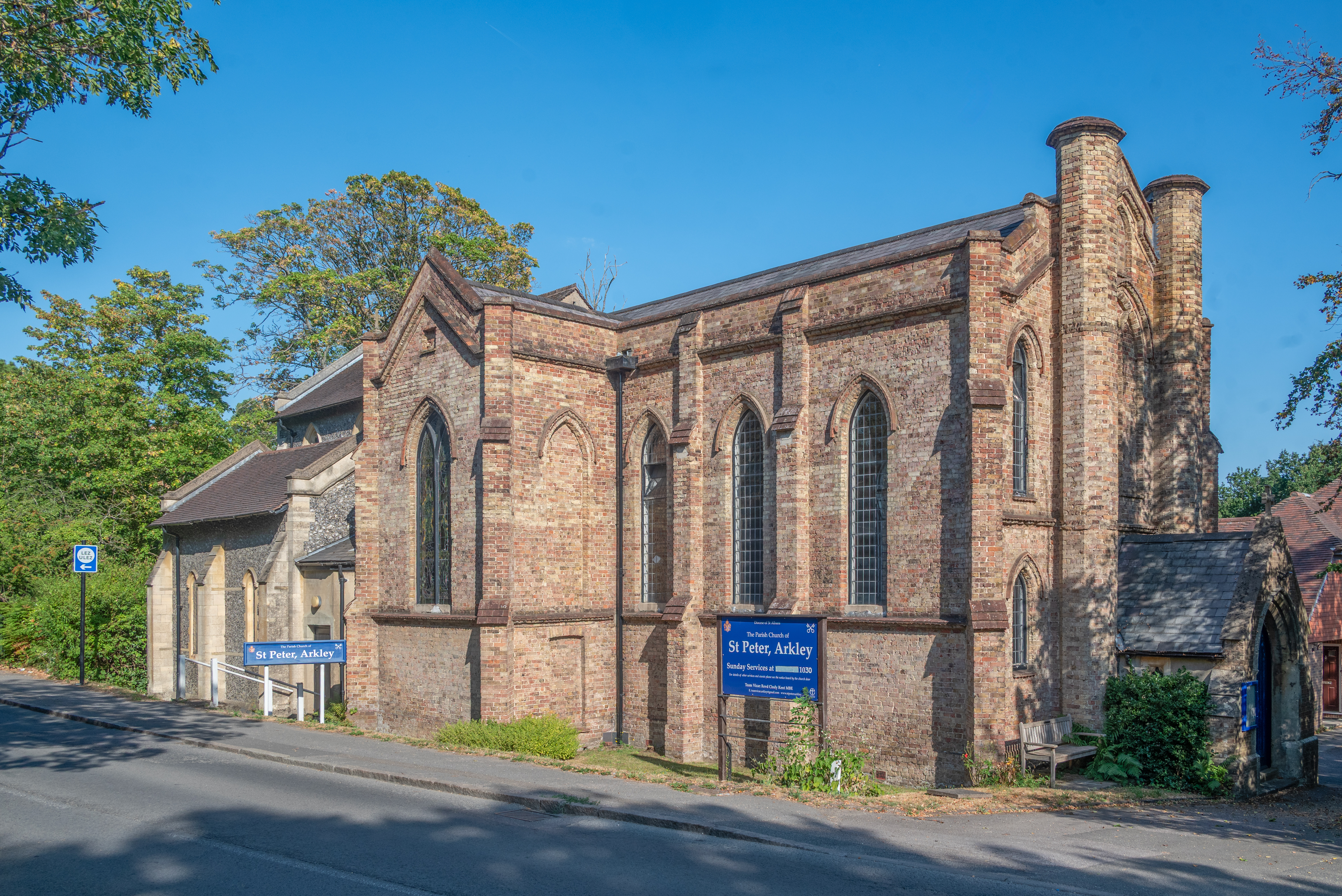
St Peter's Church

St Peter's Church, is an early Victorian Church of England church in Arkley, in the London Borough of Barnet. It is a grade II listed building.

== History ==
The construction of the church, from local bricks, was funded by Enosh Durant (c.1778-1848). It was consecrated on 1 November 1840 by Charles James Blomfield, Bishop of London. Durant, who is commemorated by a monument placed in the church by his widow the year after his death, was the owner of a local brickworks, and lived at the High Canons estate in Shenley, near Borehamwood.

The chancel was added in 1898 and was consecrated by the Bishop of St Albans, John Festing. The stained glass of the east window by Charles Eamer Kempe was installed in 1903. In 1921 a Lady Chapel was added and a war memorial, now Grade II listed, was unveiled opposite the church in 1920. There are also memorials in the church to the fallen of both World Wars. A commemorative bench by the west door (2023) is dedicated to local stalwarts Geoffrey and Jan Mabbett. This replaced one installed in 1953 for the Coronation of Queen Elizabeth II, which, after 70 years, was in poor condition. Another bench, to commemorate the Coronation of Charles III (2023), was unveiled by Theresa Villiers MP and is in the garden behind the church.

St Peter's was originally built for the benefit of Durant's tenants and workers, but, some years after his death, it became a chapel-of-ease of St John the Baptist Church, Chipping Barnet. It was dedicated for this purpose in 1888 by Alfred Blomfield, Bishop of Colchester, son of Charles Blomfield.

Arkley became a separate parish in 1905 with St Peter's as its church. Since 1983 St Peter's has been part of what is now the Chipping Barnet Team Ministry.

== Notable people ==
The ashes of the English actor Trevor Howard are buried in an unmarked plot near the church. A small plaque on the exterior wall of the church commemorates the Howard family.

Christine Hardman, who, as Bishop of Newcastle, became the second female diocesan bishop in the Church of England, was married at St. Peter’s in 1971.

The Vicar from 2024-6 was the Revd Cindy Kent, former lead singer of the 1960s/70s folk-pop band the Settlers.

== Gallery ==
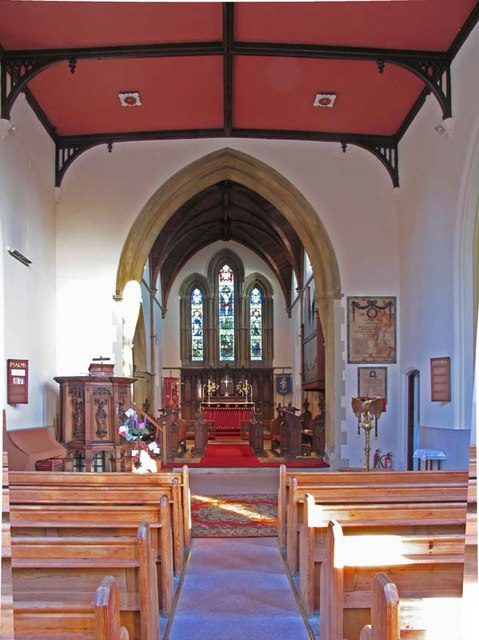
East end

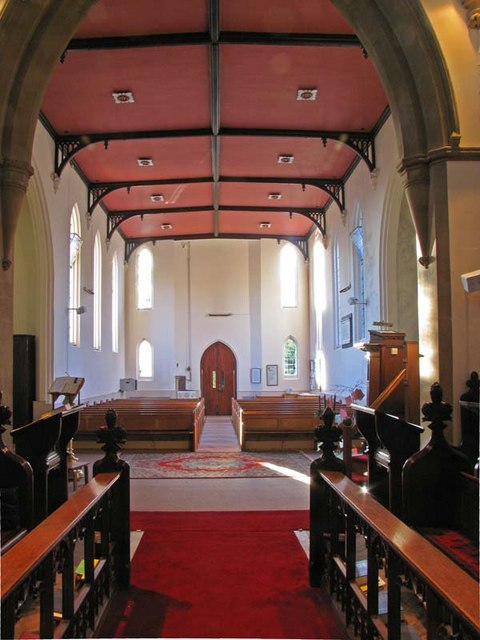
West end

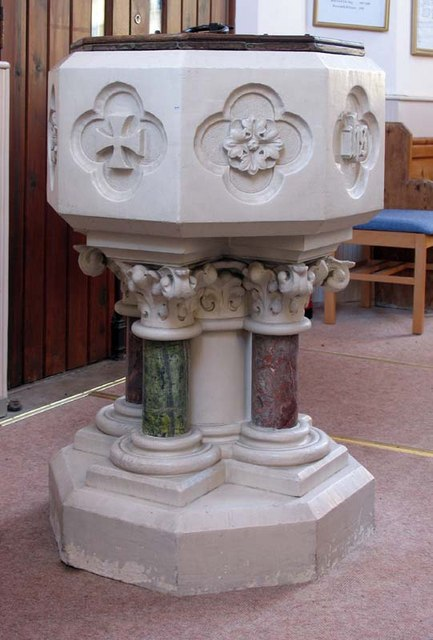
Font

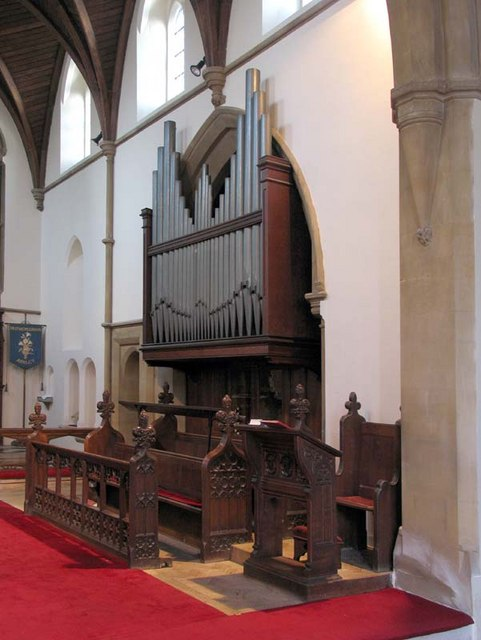
Organ

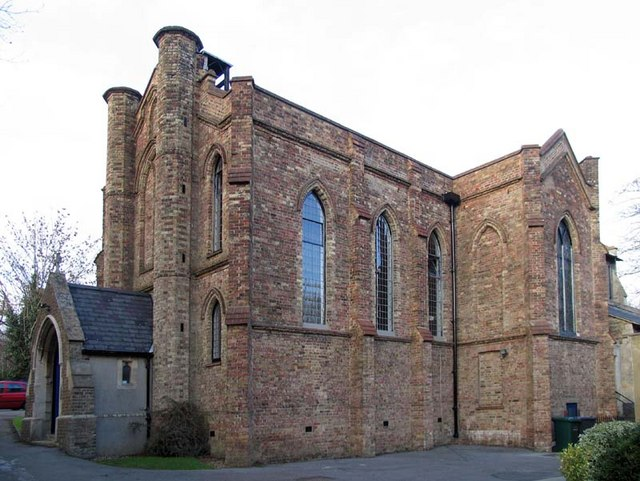
South side
