= Barnet Gate =

Hamlet in the London Borough of Barnet, England

Coordinates: 51.643083°N 0.240570°W

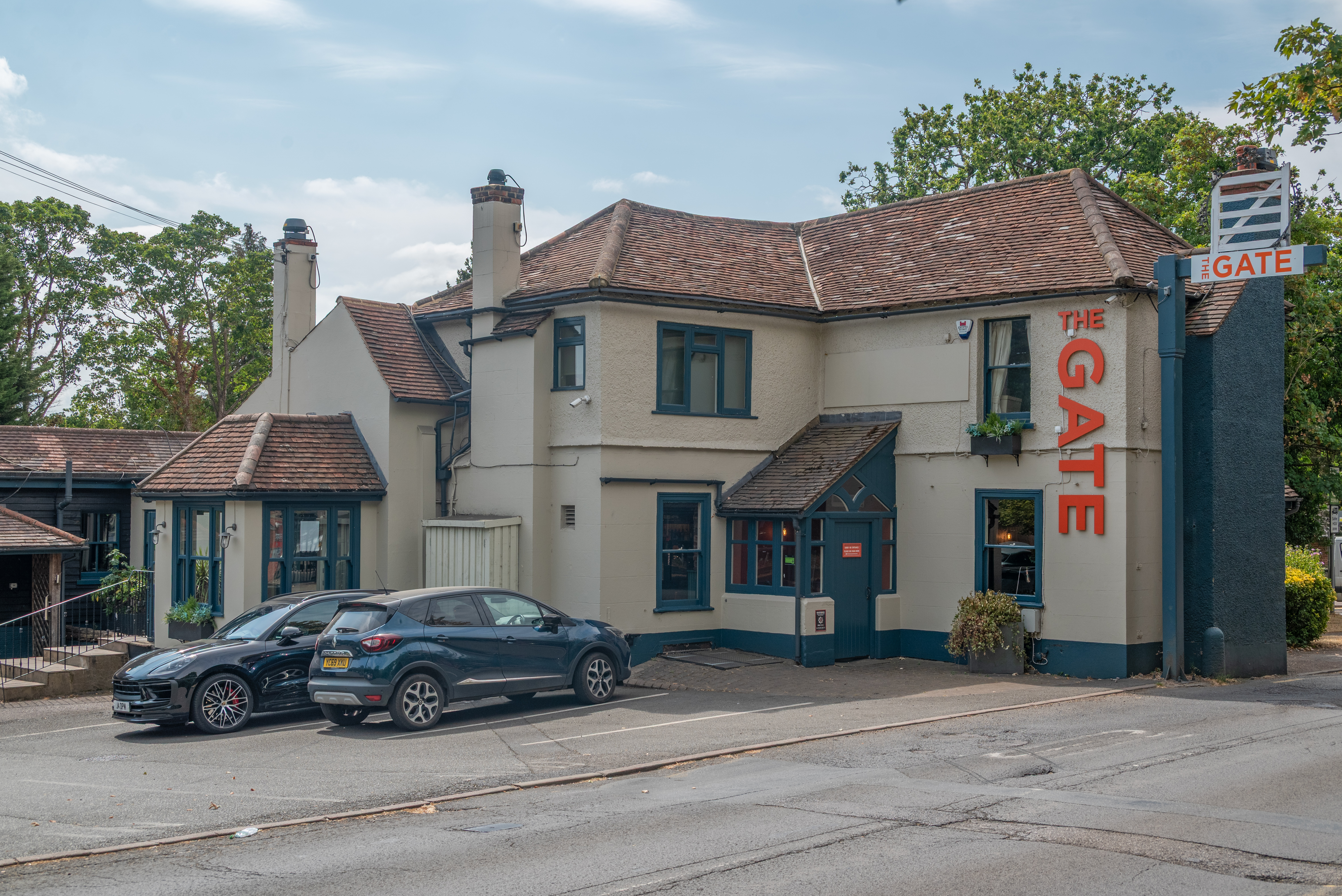
- The Gate public house

- Location within Greater London
- London borough: Barnet
- Ceremonial county: Greater London
- Region: London
- Country: England
- Sovereign state: United Kingdom
- Post town: BARNET
- Postcode district: EN5
- Post town: LONDON
- Postcode district: NW7
- Dialling code: 020
- Police: Metropolitan
- Fire: London
- Ambulance: London
- London Assembly: Barnet and Camden

Barnet Gate is a village on the northern edge of the London Borough of Barnet to the west of Arkley, in England. There was a settlement there during the Roman occupation of Britain and in the Anglo-Saxon period it was known as Grendeles Gatan (Grendel's Gate or Grendelgate) after Grendel, the monster in the epic poem Beowulf. Manor courts were held there and brickmaking was an important local industry. It was on the edge of Southaw wood which was cleared when nearby Chipping Barnet was developed after which it was known as Barnet Gate. The Gate referred to no longer exists but was either a gate used to prevent cattle straying onto Barnet Common or a gate that marked the boundary between Hertfordshire and Middlesex.

== History ==
Barnet Gate was a settlement as early as the Roman occupation of Britain and Hendon Wood Lane may have been a Roman road.

During the Anglo-Saxon period, Barnet Gate was known as Grendeles Gatan (Grendel's Gate or Grendelgate) and referred to as such in a c.975 charter giving the northern bounds of Hendon, a reference to the monster killed in the legend of Beowulf. The gate referred to no longer exists but was either a gate used to prevent cattle straying onto Barnet Common, or a gate that marked the boundary between Hertfordshire and Middlesex which ran through the locality. Manor courts were held in the area and the British Library hold a book in their collection titled Barnet Court Book which records a manor court held in Barnet Gate in 1354. It had the name Greensgate in 1574 and Grinsgate in 1754.

The settlement was on the edge of Southaw (or Suthawe) wood which belonged to the Abbey of St Albans but which was cleared when Chipping Barnet was developed to the east. The word barnet is derived from the Old English word bærnet, or "the land cleared by burning".

== Industry ==
There is a history of brickmaking in the area with a brickworks recorded in the 13th century. A late 19th century Ordnance Survey map shows a brick field, two wash mills and a tile works on the south side of Barnet Road adjacent to Barnet Gate Lane. Brickfield Lane runs north from Barnet Road where Hadley Football Club, whose nickname is "the bricks", play at Barnet Gate Sports Ground.

== Buildings ==
The Gate public house, originally The Bell, is on the corner of Barnet Road and Hendon Wood Lane and was built during the Victorian era.

Barnet Gate Mill, also known as the Arkley Windmill, is a grade II* listed tower mill in private ground between Windmill Lane and Brickfield Lane. The associated barn for storing grain for the windmill is grade II listed in Brickfield Lane.

The entrance to the grade II listed Hyver Hall is on the south side of Barnet Road on the western side of Barnet Gate.

Winifred House, a convalescent hospital for children, moved to a purpose-built building in Barnet Gate in 1938 on the corner of Barnet Road and Hendon Wood Lane. It originally had charitable funding but joined the new National Health Service in 1948. From 1962 it began to accept mentally handicapped children and in 1971 became devoted solely to cases of mental handicap. It closed in 1999 after which Winifred House was demolished and a development of luxury homes built. The hospital is remembered with two plaques in the modern Winifred Close.

== Natural environment ==
Barnet Gate Wood is south of Barnet Road and to the west of Hendon Wood Lane. Immediately to the south of the wood is Moat Mount Open Space, a nature reserve that was originally part of the Forest of Middlesex before it was deforested. The Dollis Brook rises at Mote End Farm before running eastwards under Hendon Wood Lane and the ten-mile Dollis Valley Greenwalk, which broadly follows the route of the brook, starts at Moat Mount Open Space.

== Maps ==
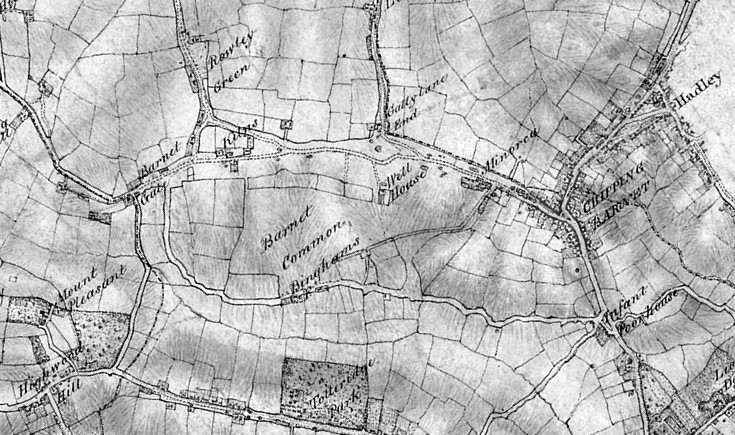
Barnet Gate (left) and Barnet Common (centre) on an 1805 map

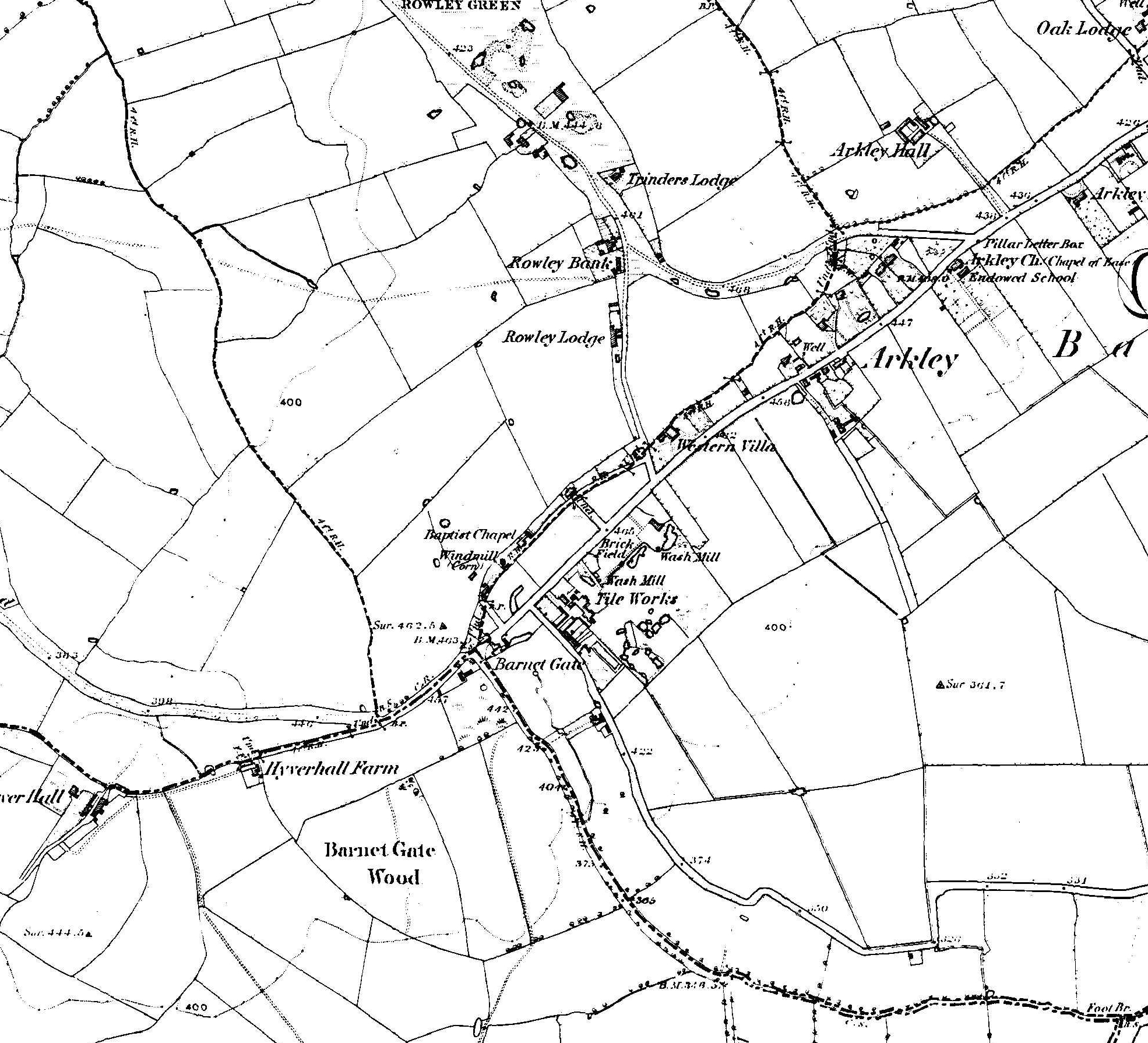
Barnet Gate and Arkley on a late 19th century Ordnance Survey map

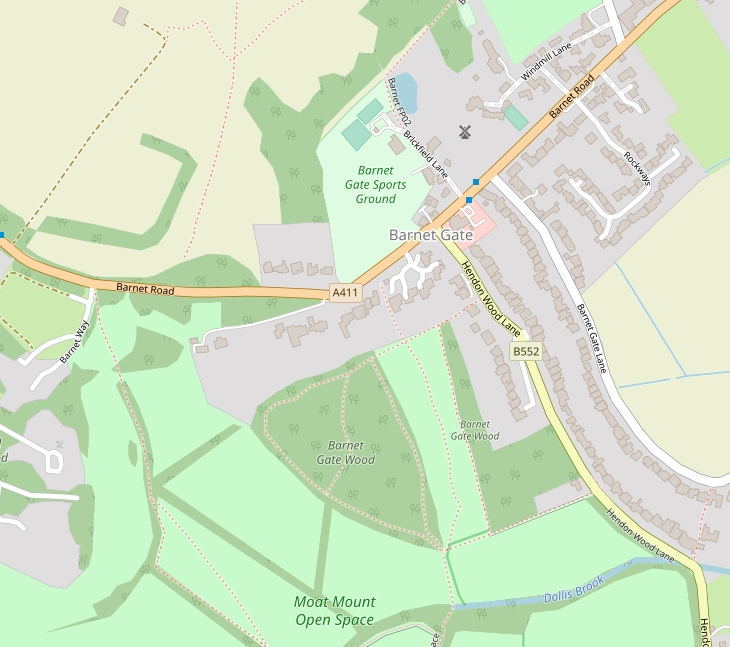
Modern area map
