= Saffron Green transmitting station =

Medium wave transmitter in Hertfordshire, England

Saffron Green
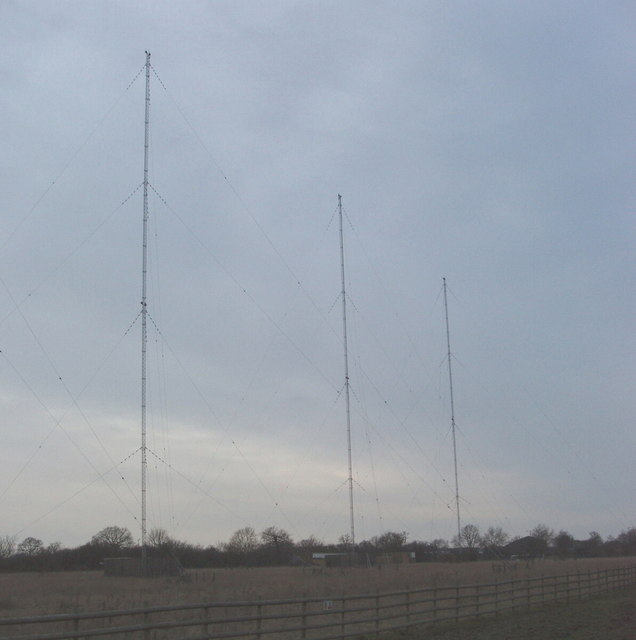

- Location within Hertfordshire
- Location: Hertfordshire
- Mast height: 71.3 metres (234 ft)
- Coordinates: 51°39′55.8″N 0°14′31.2″W
- Grid reference: TQ216977
- Built: March 1975

Saffron Green transmitting station was a facility for medium wave broadcasting near Saffron Green Meadows in Hertfordshire, 19km north-west of London. It was built by the Independent Broadcasting Authority in March 1975 to transmit two Independent Local Radio stations – Capital Radio and LBC. An earlier medium wave transmitting station is Brookmans Park, also in Hertfordshire and built by the BBC in the 1920s. The last station broadcasting from this site stopped in October 2024 and the future of the site is unknown.

Until the 1970s the BBC had a monopoly on radio broadcasting in the UK, with the exception of pirate stations and Radio Luxembourg. This changed in 1972 with the Sound Broadcasting Act and the IBA let two contracts for commercial radio in London, one for "news and information" and one for "general and entertainment". The news and information contract went to London Broadcasting Company (LBC) which started broadcasting on 8 October 1973; the general and entertainment contract was won by Capital Radio which started broadcasting on 16 October 1973.

== Engineering ==
All ILR stations were allocated an FM frequency and a MW frequency which had to broadcast the same material. Both stations launched using temporary MW transmitters and a T-antenna strung between the chimneys at Lots Road, a power station in Chelsea used by London Underground. The IBA struggled to get planning permission for the permanent station but after appealing, planning permission was granted in 1972, allowing the station to open in 1975.

The station was designed to operate without staffing and monitoring of the output was done by the radio station, error codes were transmitted on a 4.7 kHz subcarrier which were picked up by remote monitoring but were too quiet to be audible. There were two input feeds - one was a single Tariff M music circuit from the studio, and provided by the Post Office. The back up was the feed from the FM transmitter.

The MW frequencies allocated to the two stations were 1546 kHz and 1151 kHz, shared with other stations in the UK. In order to avoid interference the new station needed to use a tower array directional antenna so that the broadcasts were focused on London rather than interfering with other transmissions such as 1546 kHz in Bristol and 1151 kHz in Birmingham.

Saffron Green has a line of four mast radiators 71 m tall and 61 m apart at an angle of 161° ETN. Buried 30–45 cm underneath each mast there is an earth mat of copper wire. The site had seven Marconi B6029 transmitters running at a power of 10 kW, 5 main and 2 standby.

On 1 July 1985 there was a fire in the LBC reserve transmitter which took out both services over night. Services were restored next day, although the reserve transmitter needed to be replaced. In September 2020 one of the masts in the array was struck by lightning which damaged the antenna tuning unit. After that the reserve antenna, a wire from one of the masts, was used instead.

== Transmissions ==
In 1987 the IBA required stations to stop simulcasting on AM and FM and to provide different services. Capital radio split into Capital FM and Capital Gold, an oldies station. In 2007 Capital Gold was merged with Classic Gold to produce Gold, a similar oldies station. Gold stopped broadcasting on MW in London on 29 September 2023, as part of a move by owners Global to stop using medium wave. It remains on DAB.

LBC has a complicated history of takeovers and renames. It remained broadcasting on medium wave until 30 October 2024. It remains on DAB and in London on FM 97.3.

Frequency	Power	Service
1151 kHz until Nov 1978 1152 kHz	5.5kW transmitter power 23.5kW maximum EMRP	LBC (1975–1989) London Talkback Radio (1989–1994); London News Talk 1152 (1994–1995); LBC News 1152 (1996–2015); LBC London News (2015–2019); LBC News (2019-30 October 2024)
1546 kHz until Nov 1978 1548 kHz	27.5kW transmitter power 97.5kW maximum EMRP	Capital Radio (1975–1988) Capital Gold (1988–2007); Gold (2007-29 September 2023)
