= Arkley South Fields =

Nature reserve in London, England

Coordinates: 51.641°N 0.232°W

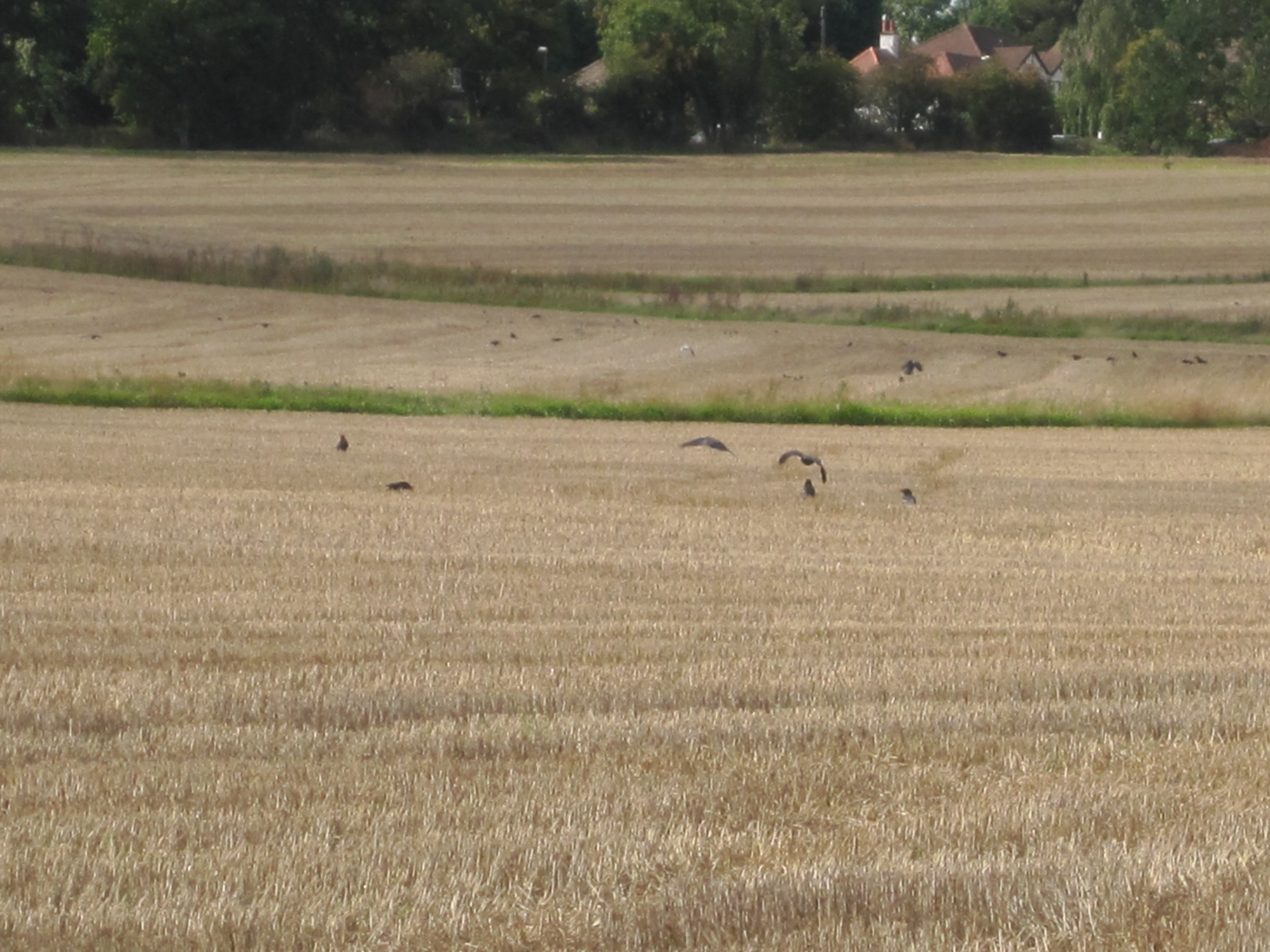

Arkley South Fields are a Site of Borough Importance for Nature Conservation, Grade II, in Arkley in the London Borough of Barnet. It is an extensive area of set-aside agricultural fields with hedgerows and ditches. It is not of great botanical interest, and its conservation value lies in its breeding birds, especially skylarks, a declining species which is a priority under the UK Biodiversity Action Plan. It also supports breeding meadow pipits, kestrels, reed buntings, whitethroats, willow warblers and green woodpeckers.

There is no public access, but going down Barnet Gate Lane from Barnet Road, it can be viewed after the last houses on the left.

== See also ==
- Nature reserves in Barnet
