= Barnet Gate Mill =

Windmill in the London Borough of Barnet, England

Arkley Windmill
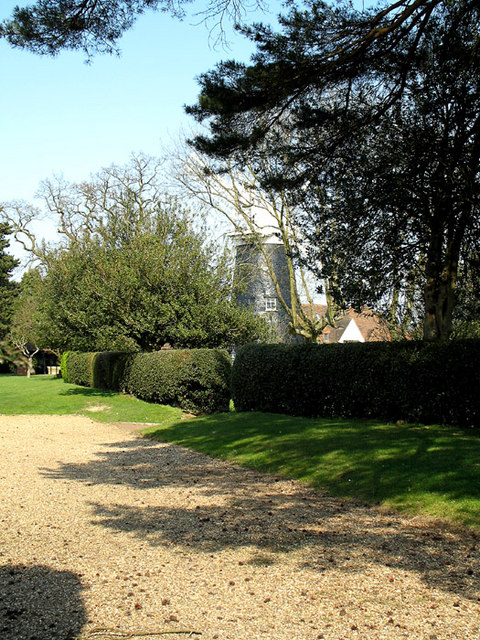
- Barnet Gate Mill
- Interactive map of Arkley Windmill

Origin
- Mill name: Barnet Gate Mill
- Grid reference: TQ 217 953
- Coordinates: 51.643°N 0.243°W
- Operator: Private
- Year built: c. 1830

Information
- Purpose: Corn mill
- Type: Tower mill
- Storeys: Four storeys
- No. of sails: Four sails
- Type of sails: Two Patent sails and two Common sails
- Windshaft: Cast iron
- Winding: Fantail
- Auxiliary power: Steam engine
- No. of pairs of millstones: Three pairs

Barnet Gate Mill or Arkley Windmill is a grade II* listed tower mill at Barnet Gate in the London Borough of Barnet, originally in Hertfordshire. There is no public access.

== History ==
Barnet Gate Mill was probably built between 1822 and 1840. A claim that it was built during the Napoleonic Wars (c.1800) has not been substantiated. Although steam had been added in 1895, it was working by wind until 1916. The mill was restored in 1930. A new cap, fantail and gallery around the cap being made. The work was done by Thomas Hunt, the Soham millwright. In a further restoration in 1985, the missing pair of sails was replaced.

== Description ==
Barnet Gate Mill is a four-storey tower mill with an ogee cap which has a gallery. It has two Patent sails and two Common sails carried on a cast iron windshaft. The cap is winded by a fantail.

== Machinery ==
The mill may have started life with two Common sails and two Spring sails carried on a wooden windshaft as the wooden clasp arm Brake Wheel has had to be fitted with packing pieces to enable it to fit the current windshaft, which being of iron is a smaller diameter than a wooden one would be. The Wallower is of cast iron, carried on a wooden upright shaft. This carries the Great Spur Wheel, which is of iron with wooden cogs and drove the two pairs of millstones underdrift. A third pair was added when steam power was installed. Only one pair of millstones remains today.

== Millers ==
- John Whitehead 1843–1851
- Frederick Edwards 1870–1899
- Noah Edwards 1896–1918
