= James Ravenscroft (cricketer) =

English cricketer

Personal information
- Full name: James Ravenscroft
- Born: 9 December 1854; Liverpool, Lancashire, England
- Died: 3 January 1931 (aged 76); Liverpool, Lancashire, England
- Batting: Right-handed

Domestic team information
- Years: Team
- 1895: Cheshire

Career statistics
Competition	First-class
Matches	2
Runs scored	0
Batting average	0.00
100s/50s	–/–
Top score	0
Balls bowled	–
Wickets	–
Bowling average	–
5 wickets in innings	–
10 wickets in match	–
Best bowling	–
Catches/stumpings	–/–
- Source: Cricinfo, 30 May 2013

James Ravenscroft (9 December 1854 – 3 January 1931) was an English cricketer. Ravenscroft was a right-handed batsman. He was born in Liverpool, Lancashire.

A club cricketer for Rock Ferry Cricket Club and Sefton Park Cricket Club, Ravenscroft made two first-class appearances for a combined Liverpool and District team, the first came against the touring Australians in 1888, while the second came in 1894 against Yorkshire, with both matches played at Aigburth Cricket Ground, Liverpool. Ravenscroft batted four times during his brief first-class career, being dismissed on all four occasions for ducks. Ravenscroft played in the Minor Counties Championship for Cheshire in 1895, making his debut for the county against Staffordshire. He appeared in four further matches for the county in that season.

He died in Liverpool on 3 January 1931.
