= Rowley Lodge Field =

UK nature reserve

Coordinates: 51.6456°N 0.2410°W

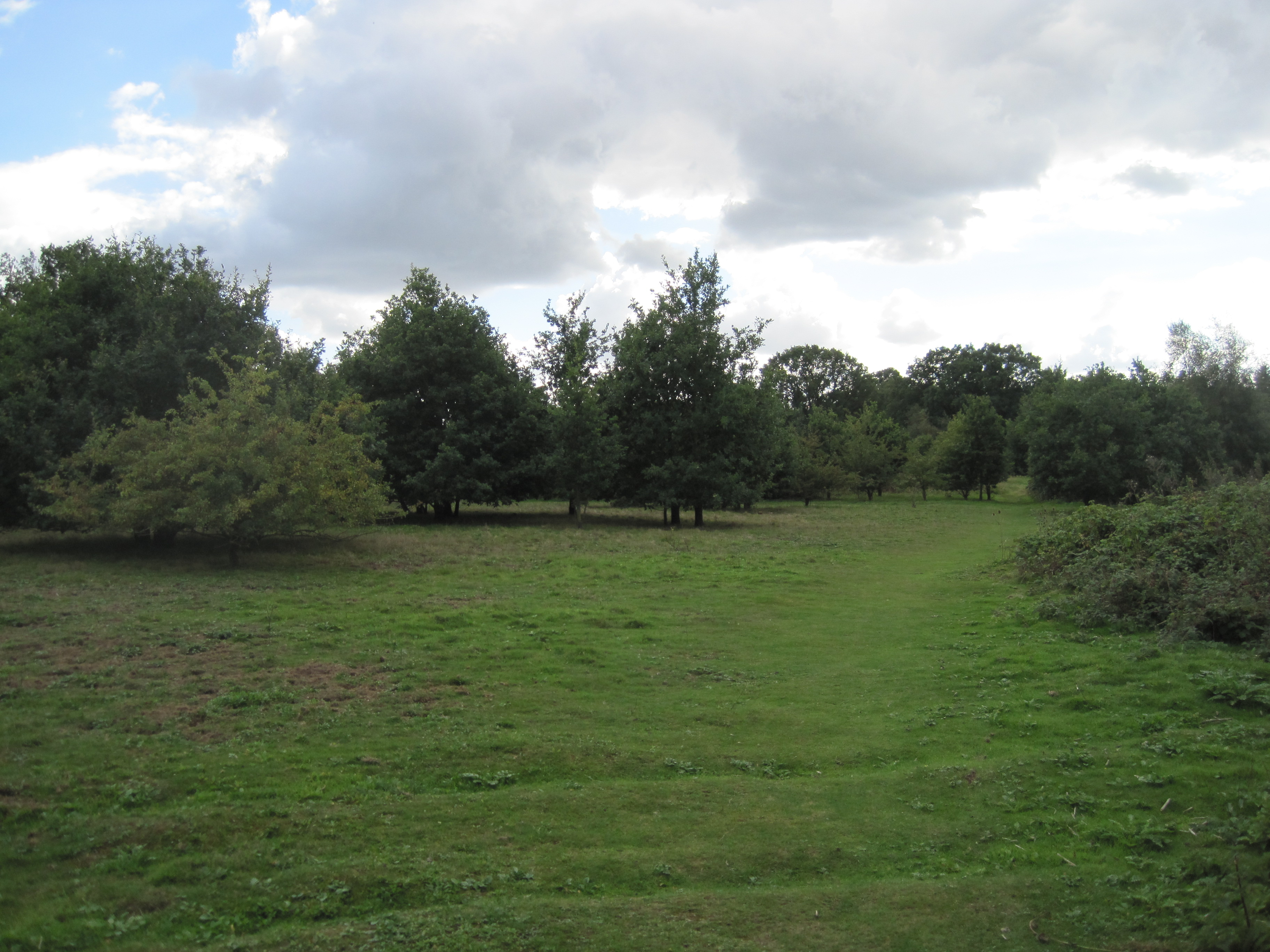

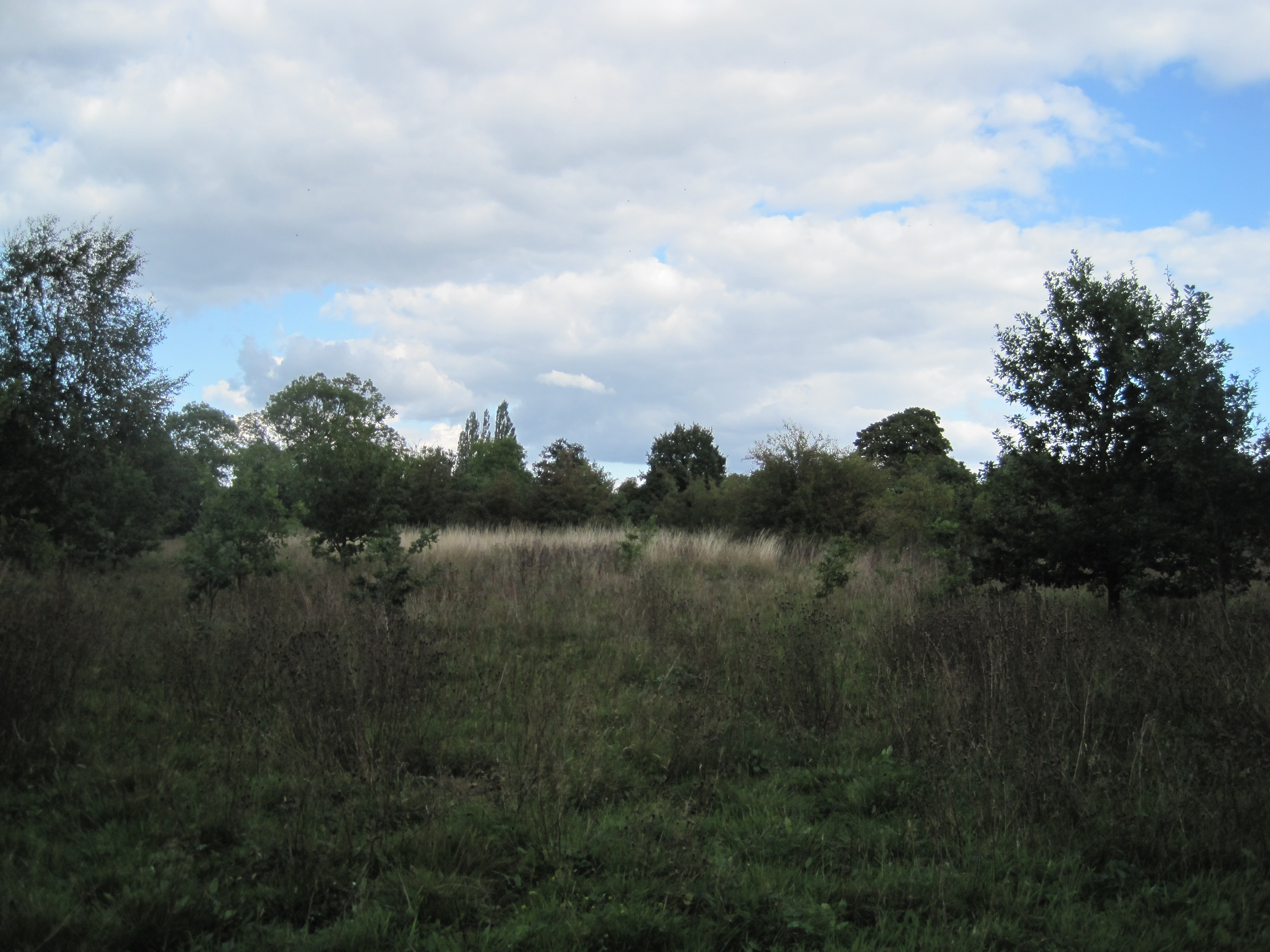

Rowley Lodge Field is a Site of Borough Importance for Nature Conservation, Grade II, in Rowley Green in the London Borough of Barnet.

Rowley Lodge Field is an old hay meadow, with flower rich grassland and scattered oak trees. It has a good diversity of wild flowers, including great burnet and pignut, both characteristic of unimproved grassland. Patches of acid grassland are dominated by red fescue, and also contain abundant sheep's sorrel and tormentil.

Access is by a footpath from Rowley Lane near the junction with Rowley Green Road. A stile on the left then leads to another footpath which goes through Rowley Lodge Field to a small wood and then to Brickfield Lane.

== See also ==
- Nature reserves in Barnet
