= Arkley Lane and Pastures =

Nature reserve in Arkley, Greater London, England

Coordinates: 51.655°N 0.230°W

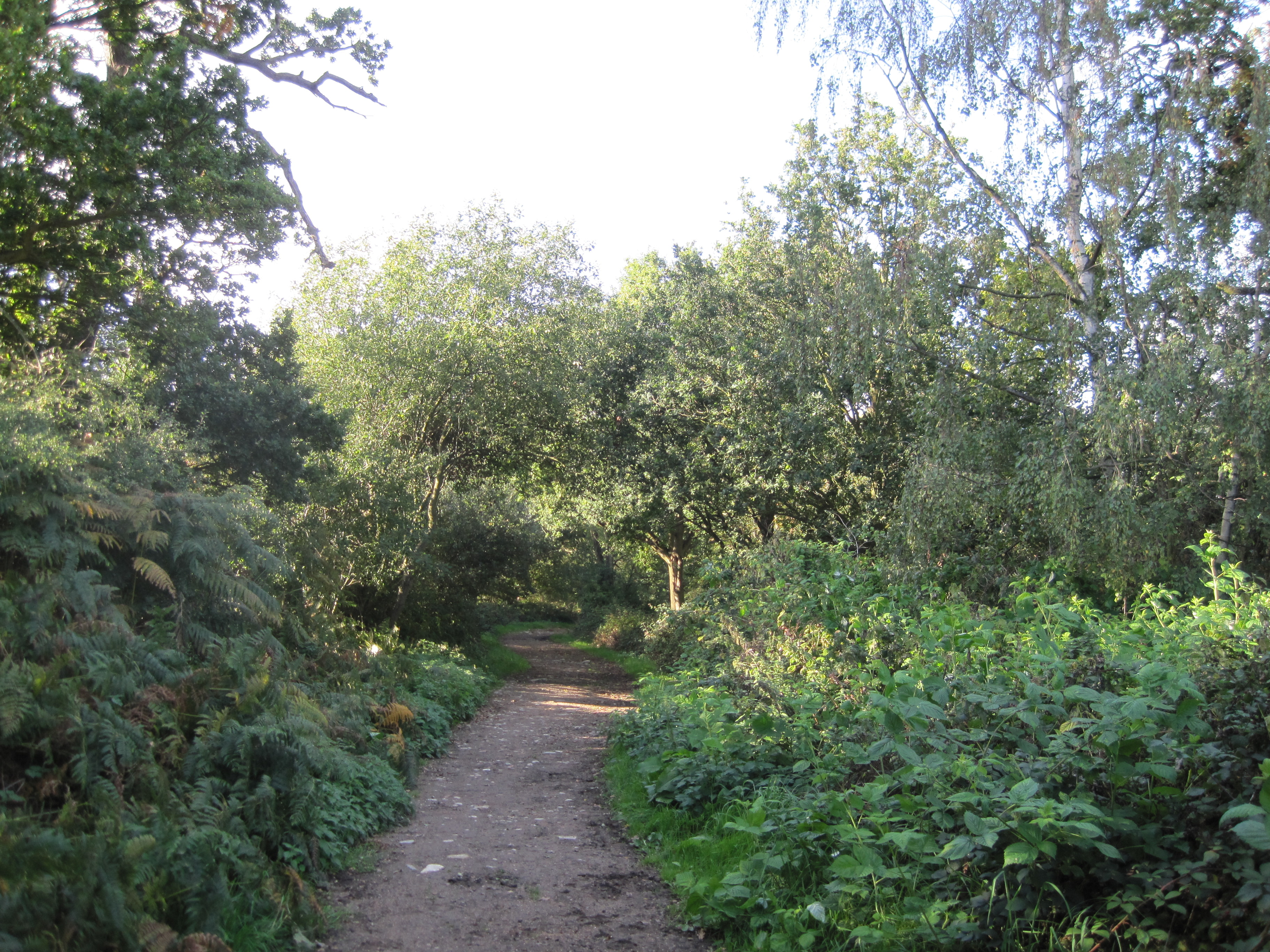
Arkley Lane

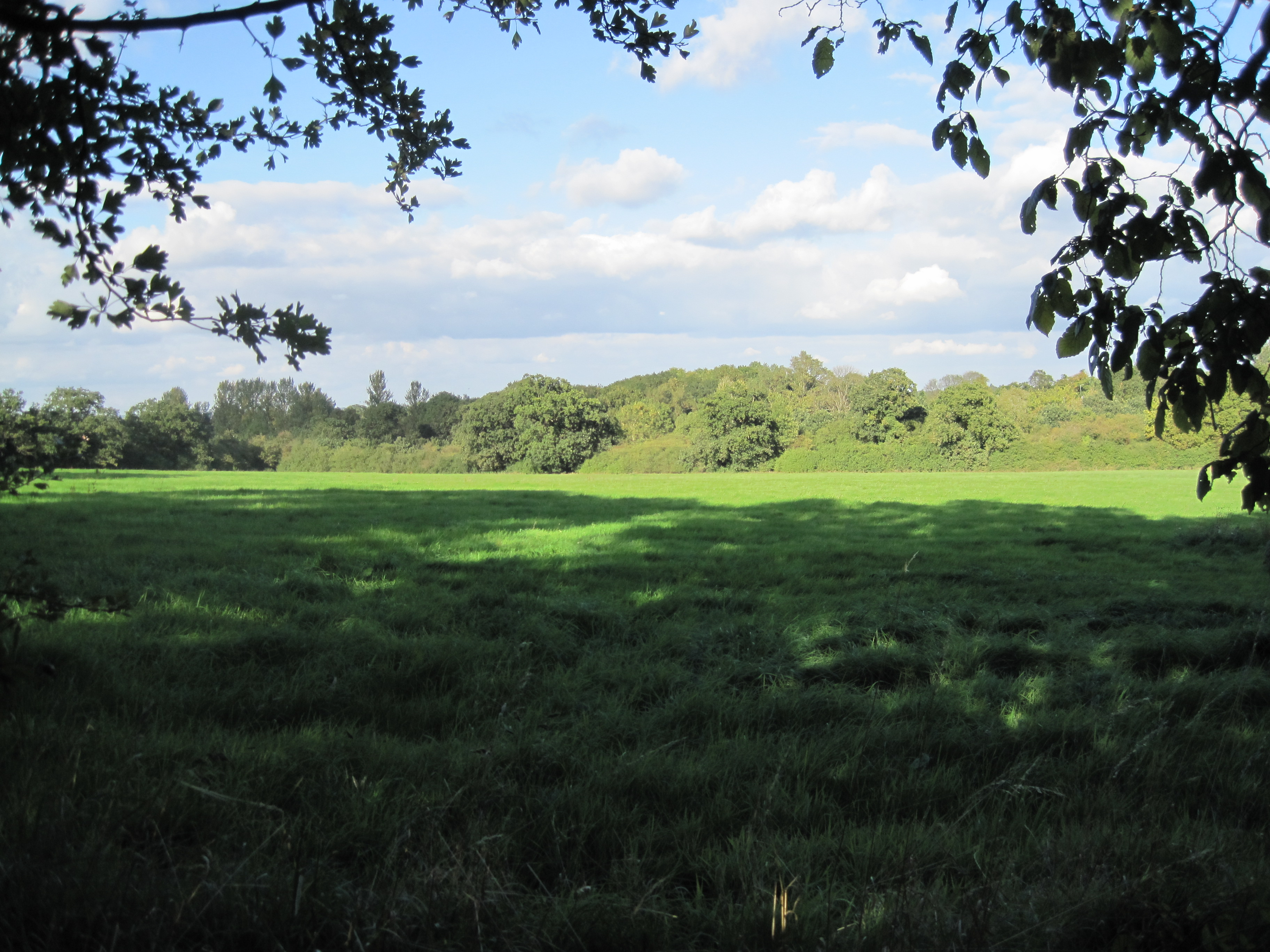
Field next to Arkley Lane

Arkley Lane and Pastures is a 50-hectare (120-acre) Site of Borough Importance for Nature Conservation, Grade II, in Arkley in the London Borough of Barnet. Arkley Lane, off Barnet Road, is an old drovers' road. Located on the Barnet Plateau, it is now a quiet country lane with a traditional bank and ditch. The thick hedges are composed of beech and hornbeam, ash, field maple and magnificent old pedunculate oaks.

The hedge flora are dominated by cow parsley, and the ditches have wetland flowers including water figwort and wild angelica. A small adjacent woodland, which is probably ancient, has nesting birds, including sparrowhawks, willow warblers and stock doves. Muntjac deer are often seen there.

The fields on either side of the lane are traditionally managed, some grazed by horses and others managed as hay meadows. Three fields which have escaped agricultural improvement support wild flowers typical of old grassland, such as sneezewort and pignut.

There is only public access to the lane itself. The tarmacked road continues as a bridleway beyond the Barnet boundary to Saffron Green Meadows in Hertfordshire and to the A1 road.

== See also ==
- Nature reserves in Barnet
