= Arkley (automobile) =

The Arkley is an English automobile that was manufactured by John Britten Garages workshops at Arkley in the London Borough of Barnet.

The first model was a two-seater called Arkley SS, designed by John Britten in 1970 (not to be confused with the famous New Zealand motorcycle designer, John Britten).

The retro "bug-eyed" design was inspired by a mixture of the Morgan and the original Austin-Healey Sprite. The main purpose was recycling old rusty or damaged Austin-Healey Sprites or MG Midgets. The Arkley SS utilised a BMC A-Series engine launched by Austin in 1951.

The Arkley Midget used fibre glass front and rear ends fitted to the donor car. Transformation did not affect the main structural members. There were two versions, the S for standard wheels and the SS for wide wheels.

Peter May, who had worked with John Britten Garages, founded Peter May Engineering in Halesowen in 1979 and bought the manufacturing rights to the Arkley in 1987. Production of the DIY fiberglass kits continues via Peter May Engineering, from their workshops in Ombersley, Worcestershire.

Since 1971, around 1000 kits have been sold, but the surviving number today is unknown.

Some kits were modified, such as a one-off called Pink Bathtub, produced in 1990.

== See also ==
- List of car manufacturers of the United Kingdom
