= Rowley Green Common =

Nature reserve in Arkley, London, England

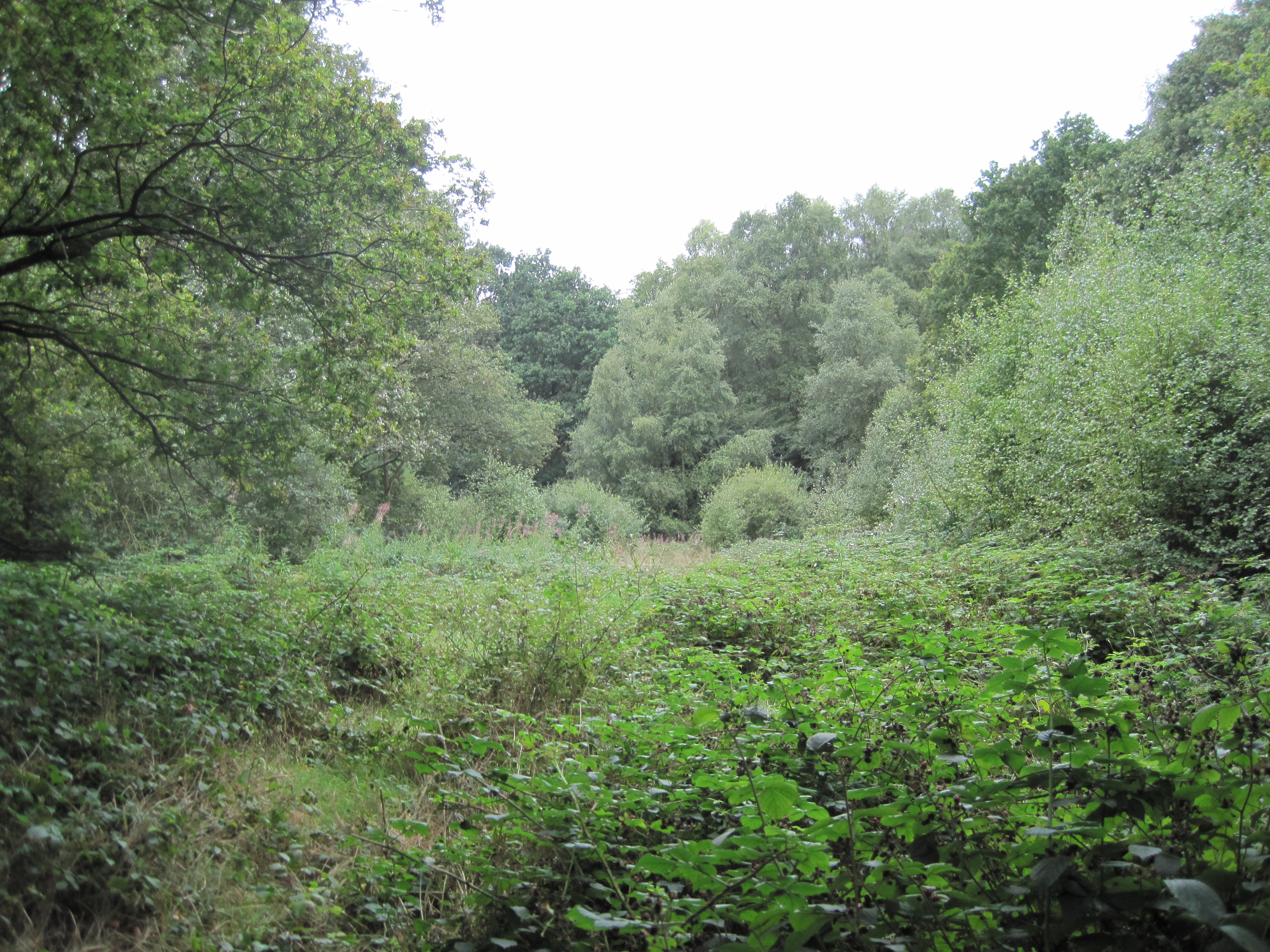
- Local nature reserve
- Interactive map of Rowley Green Common
- Location: Rowley Green
- Coordinates: 51.6502°N 0.2433°W

Rowley Green Common is a six hectare local nature reserve and a Site of Importance Metropolitan for Nature Conservation in Rowley Green, north London. It is owned by the London Borough of Barnet. It is also registered common land.

It is mainly woodland and heathland, although the most important habitat is the peat bog, one of very few left in London. This hosts star sedge, which is rare in London. The site has hedges at least three hundred years old, and a large pond is also of botanical interest.

It was once part of Shenleybury Manor in the parish of Shenley, Hertfordshire. The site has a long history of use. Gravel was once dug on it and this led to the formation of ponds and bog hollows. Cattle were grazed on it until the 1940s and the army used it for manoeuvres during the Second World War. Rowley Green was obtained as public open space in 1934 when Barnet Urban District Council bought the land from the Lord of the manor. It was declared a Local Nature Reserve by the London Borough of Barnet in 1991, the first site in the borough to gain this status.

Access is from Rowley Lane, next to Rowley Green Farm.

== See also ==
- Barnet parks and open spaces
- Nature reserves in Barnet
