= James Ravenscroft (philanthropist) =

James Ravenscroft (died 1680) was a lawyer, merchant, and philanthropist in Chipping Barnet, in what is now north London.

== Early life and family ==
He was the son of Thomas Ravenscroft.

== Career ==
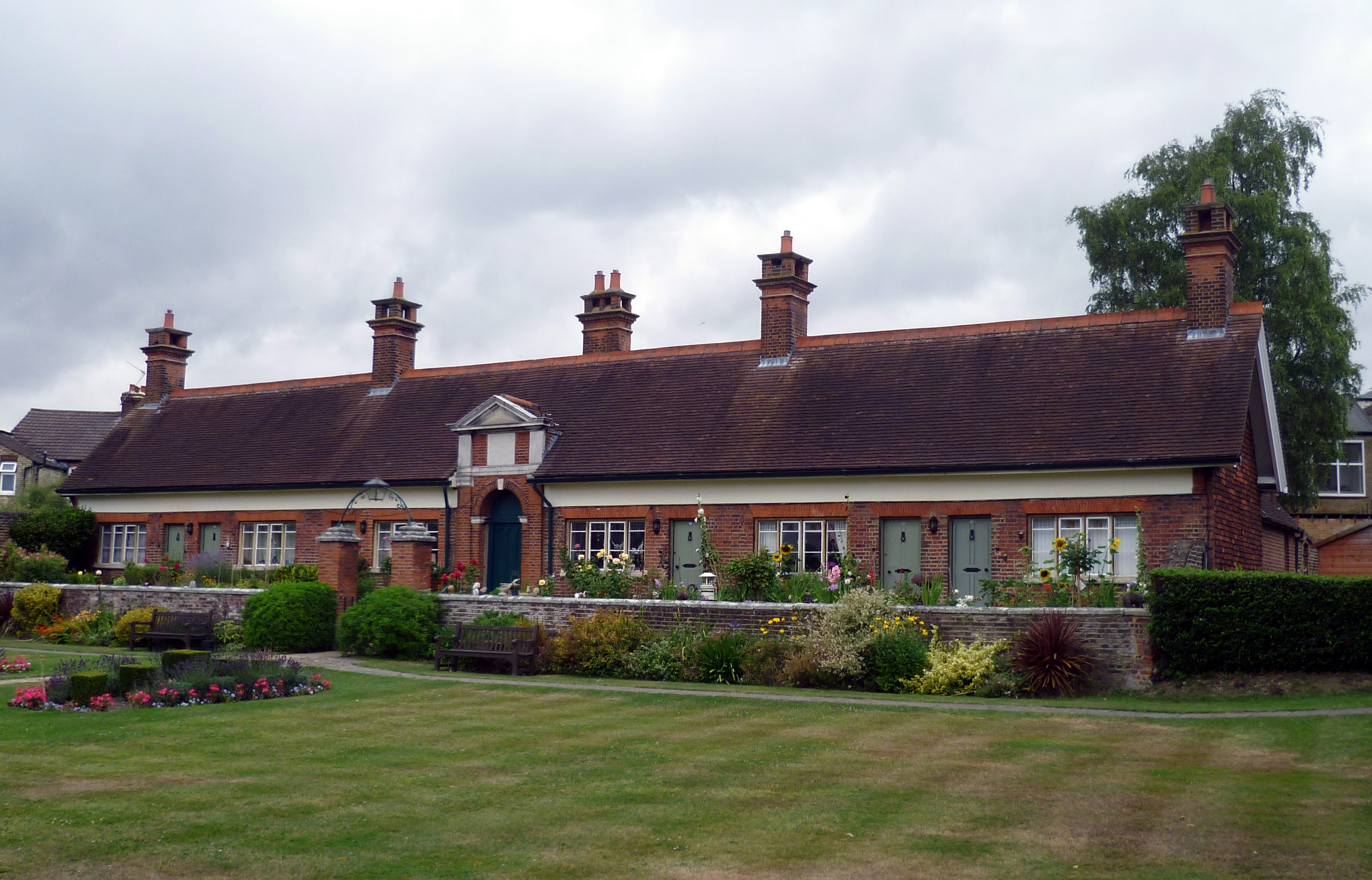
The rebuilt Ravenscroft Cottages in Wood Street, Chipping Barnet

Ravenscroft was a lawyer and merchant, dealing in lace, currants and glass.

In 1679, Ravenscroft, then of High Holborn in London, had the Ravenscroft Almshouses built for six "poore antient women".

== Death and legacy ==
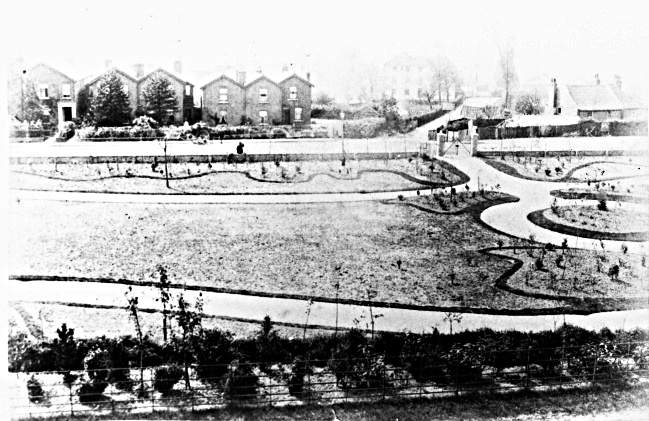
Ravenscroft Gardens, 1880

Ravenscroft died on 28 January 1680. Barnet Recreation Ground was renamed Ravenscroft Gardens in his memory.
