= Ravenscroft Cottages =

Almshouses in Barnet, London, England

Coordinates: 51.6494°N 0.1899°W

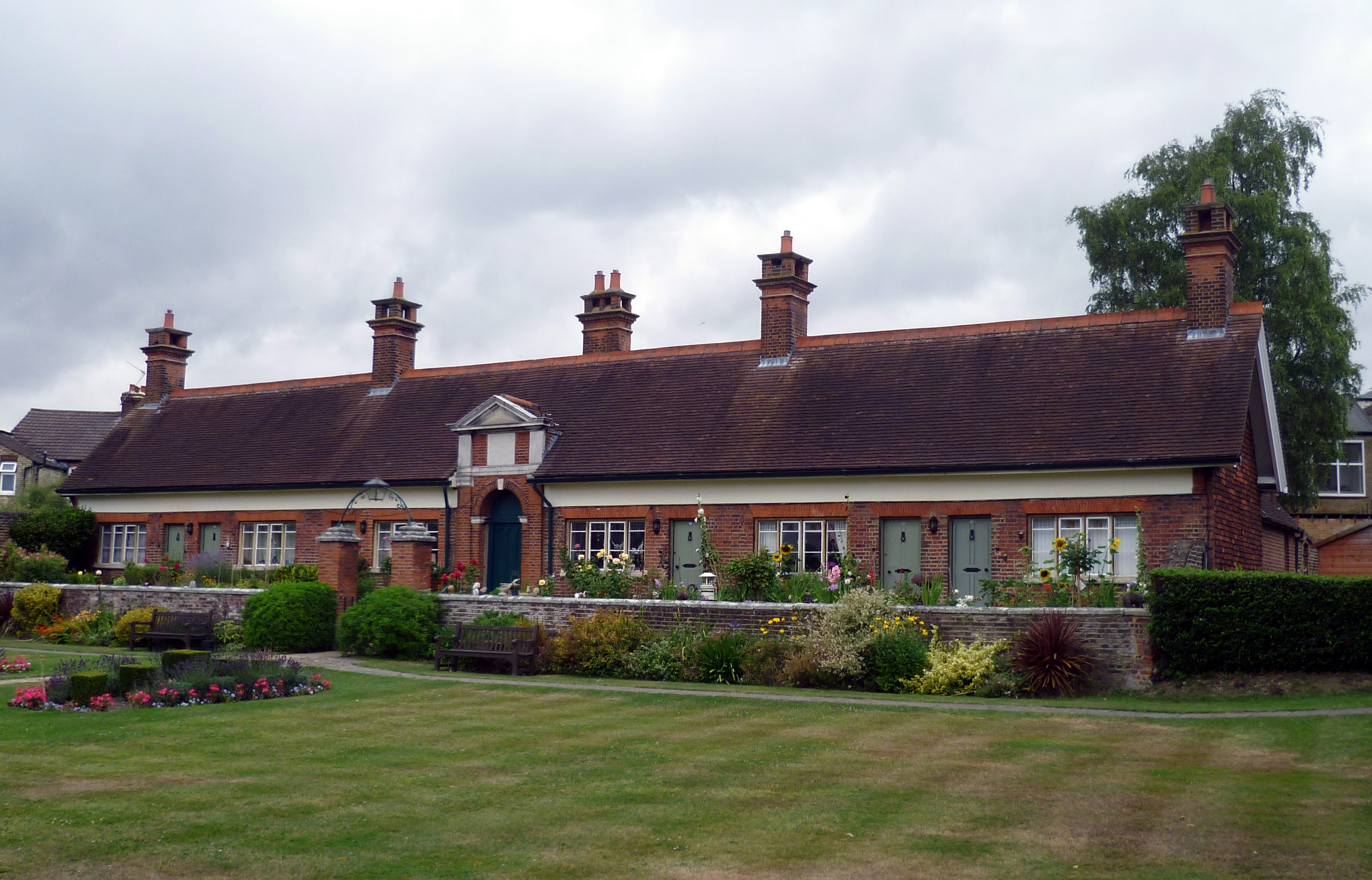
Ravenscroft Cottages

The Ravenscroft Cottages, also known as Jesus Hospital, are grade II listed almshouses in Wood Street, Chipping Barnet. The houses were built in 1672 but rebuilt in the 19th century.
