= Lancelot Gerald Hasluck =

English surveyor and philanthropist (1861–1937)

- Born: 10 November 1861; Enfield, London, England
- Died: July 2, 1937 (aged 75)
- Burial place: Bells Hill Burial Ground, London, England
- Occupations: Surveyor, philanthropist
- Father: Frederick Hasluck

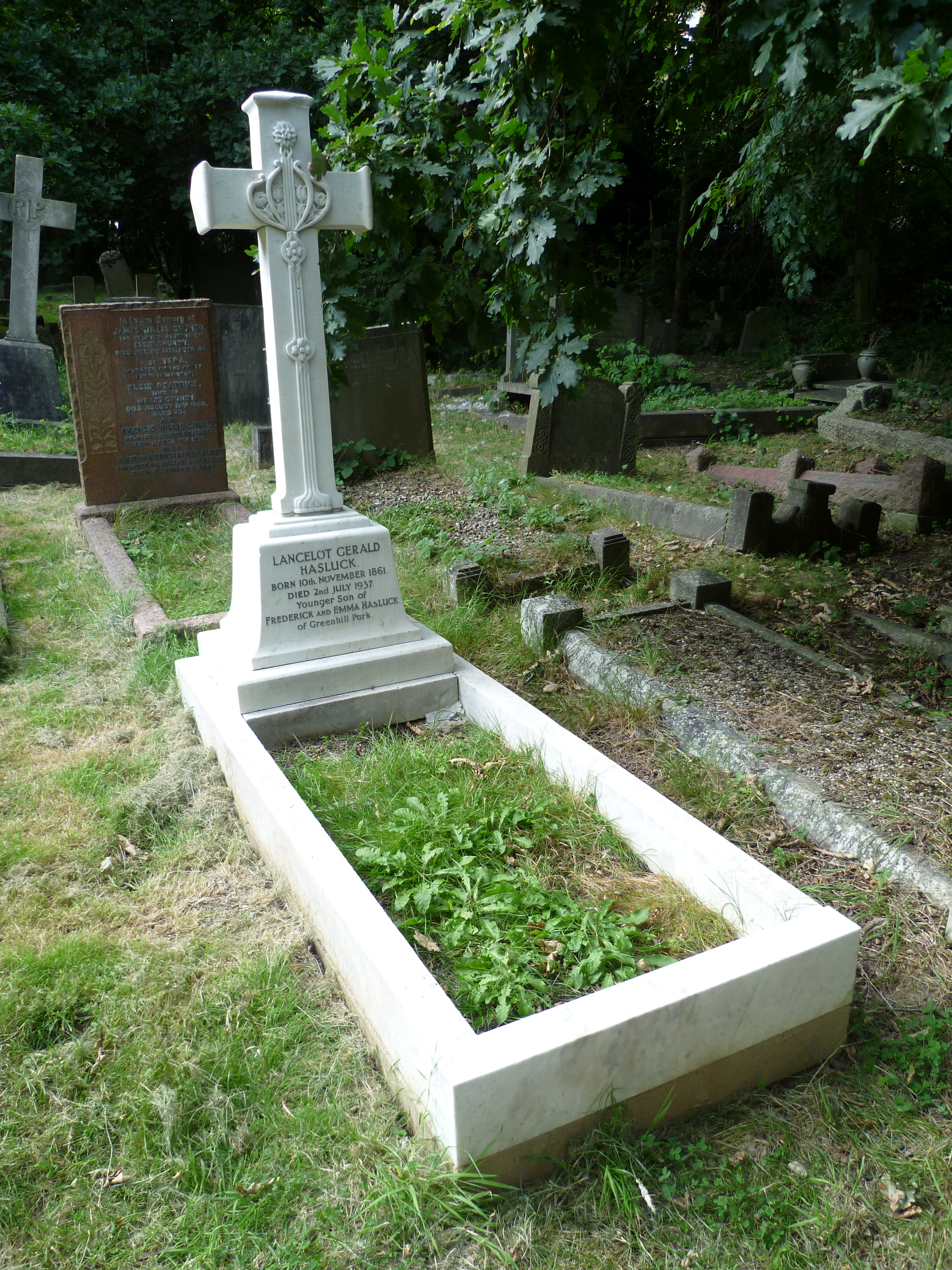
Hasluck's grave at Bells Hill Burial Ground, Chipping Barnet.

Lancelot Gerald Hasluck (10 November 1861 – 2 July 1937) was an English surveyor and philanthropist who founded the Lancelot Hasluck Trust.

== Early life and family ==
Lancelot Gerald Hasluck was born in Enfield, London, on 10 November 1861, the younger son of Frederick and Emma Hasluck (née Pedley) of Greenhill Park, Barnet. After his father died in 1887, his mother married the Reverend George Twentyman, the minister of New Barnet Congregational Church, who died in 1912. Emma Hasluck died in 1926.

Frederick Hasluck was in partnership with his brother as merchants in Hatton Garden, London. The Pedleys were lawyers in the City of London and Lancelot's grandfather, Samuel Pedley, had interests in property in London.

== Career ==
Hasluck was a fellow of the Institute of Chartered Surveyors and from 1898 a member of East Barnet Urban District Council. He was a magistrate and a governor of the Queen Elizabeth's School. He was vice-chairman of the Jesus Hospital Charity.

He is best known, however, for the Lancelot Hasluck Trust which provides almshouses to residents of East Barnet, Chipping Barnet or Friern Barnet who are of limited means. Hasluck established the trust on 18 September 1931, originally with the aim of providing housing for married couples when most almshouses were intended for single people. Bombing during the Second World War hindered the development of houses but it now owns 44 properties.

== Death ==
Hasluck died on 2 July 1937. He is buried at Bells Hill Burial Ground, Chipping Barnet. He and his family are remembered in the streets Hasluck Gardens and Greenhill Park in New Barnet, and Lancelot Gardens near Oak Hill Park.

== See also ==
- Greenhill Gardens, New Barnet
