= Albert Curtis =

Albert Curtis may refer to:

- Albert Edward Curtis (1866–1940), English recipient of the Victoria Cross
- Albert Curtis (tennis) (1875–1933), Australian tennis player
