= Willenhall House =

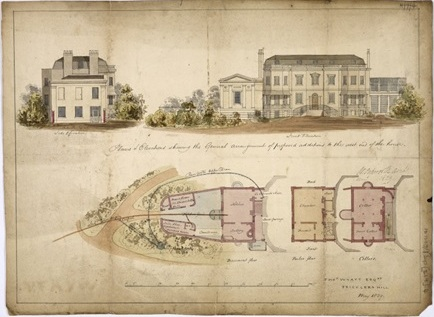
- Designs for Willenhall House by John Buonarotti Papworth, 1829
- Interactive map of the Willenhall House area

General information
- Status: Demolished
- Type: Country house
- Location: Barnet, United Kingdom
- Coordinates: 51.64203°N 0.17954°W
- Estimated completion: 1829
- Demolished: 1890
- Client: Thomas Wyatt

Design and construction
- Architect: John Buonarotti Papworth

Willenhall House was a house and estate located to the south of Chipping Barnet, on the borders of Hertfordshire and Middlesex, in what is now north London.

It was designed by John Buonarotti Papworth in 1829 for the East Indies merchant Thomas Wyatt to replace an existing house on a piece of land that was once part of the ancient Pricklers (later Greenhill) estate. Wyatt named it after Willenhall in the English West Midlands, the place of his birth. The house was demolished in 1890 and the site developed for housing over the following decades.

== Location ==
Willenhall House was located to the south of Chipping Barnet on the borders of Hertfordshire and Middlesex, in what is now north London, on the east side of the Great North Road in the section of the road known as Pricklers Hill. On the same side, slightly to the north, was Greenhill Park house and estate, formerly known as Pricklers, a large estate of which Willenhall had been a part until it was separated in the late 18th century.

== History ==
Willenhall House was designed by John Buonarotti Papworth in 1829 for the East Indies merchant Thomas Wyatt to replace Belle Vue, an existing house on the site purchased by Wyatt around 1820. He named the new house after his birthplace of Willenhall in Warwickshire.

Wyatt owned the house until his death in London's Hanover Square on 6 April 1834 at the age of 51. It then passed to his wife Elizabeth Wyatt for life but she did not live there. Thomas Wyatt is buried in the family vault at St Mary the Virgin church, East Barnet. Elizabeth died in 1867.

From 1834 to 1848, the house was let to Adolph Leopold Pfeil, a London ironmonger, and later to a Mr Harris, the brewer Charles Addington Hanbury, and a Mr Morris. In 1862, the house was sold to a Mr Simpson, and a few years later to Sir John Peter Grant, Lieutenant-Governor of Bengal and Governor of Jamaica. Grant expanded the estate by purchasing 10 acres of land adjacent to Pricklers Hill. He sold the house after succeeding to the Grant family estate on the death of his older brother, and the house came into the ownership of T. G. Waterhouse, who later sold it to the tea merchant William Alpheus Higgs, who served as sheriff of London and Middlesex. Higgs died in December 1889.

== Demolition and legacy ==
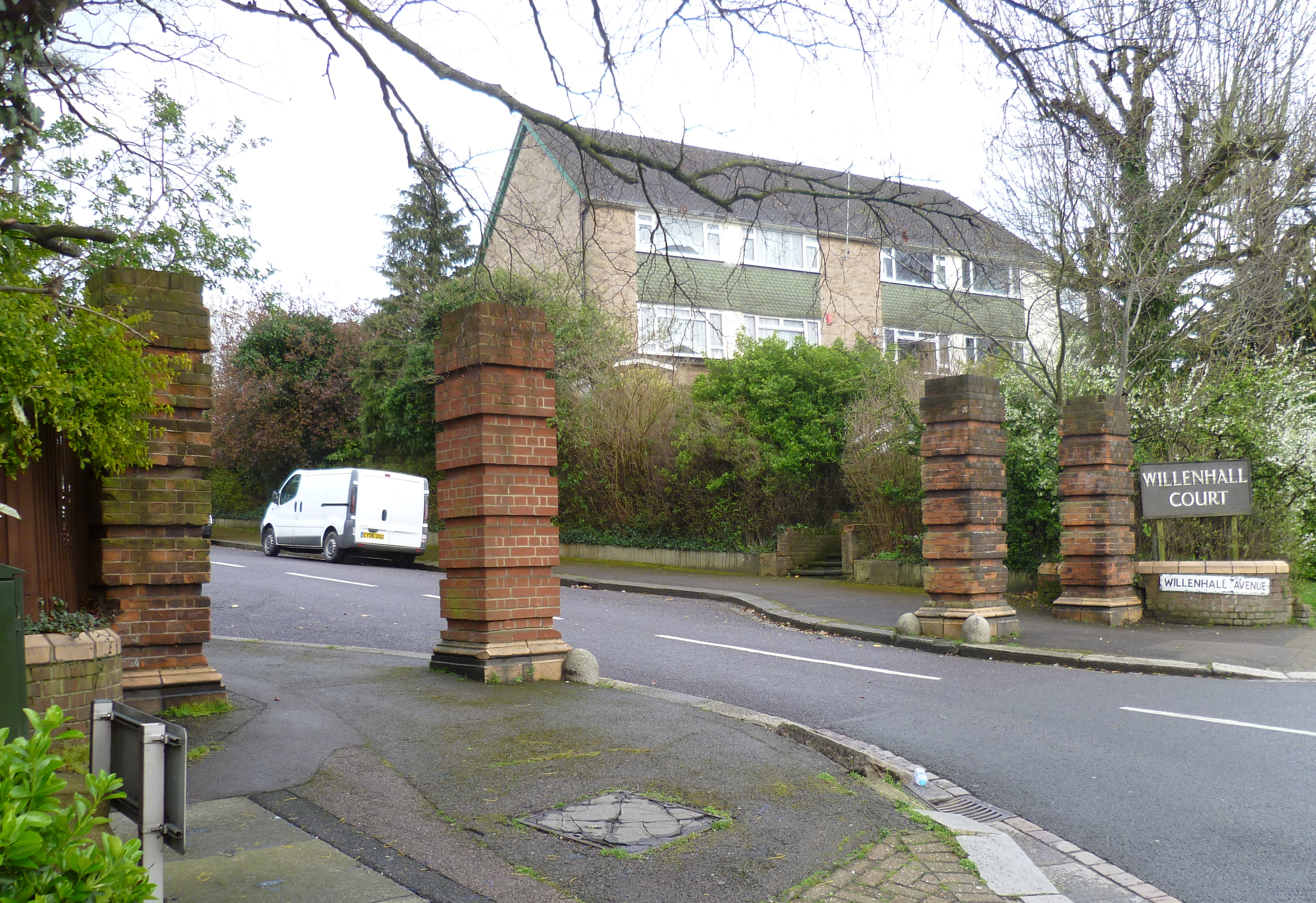
Gate posts at the western end of Willenhall Avenue where it joins the Great North Road (Pricklers Hill) with Willenhall Court on the right

The house was demolished in 1890 and the site built over. Willenhall Avenue is named after the house, and a modern block of flats adjoining Willenhall Avenue is known as Willenhall Court. The brick gate posts at the western end of Willenhall Avenue are the only surviving remains of Willenhall and around 1930 still had ornamental arched lintels over each pair.

== Maps ==
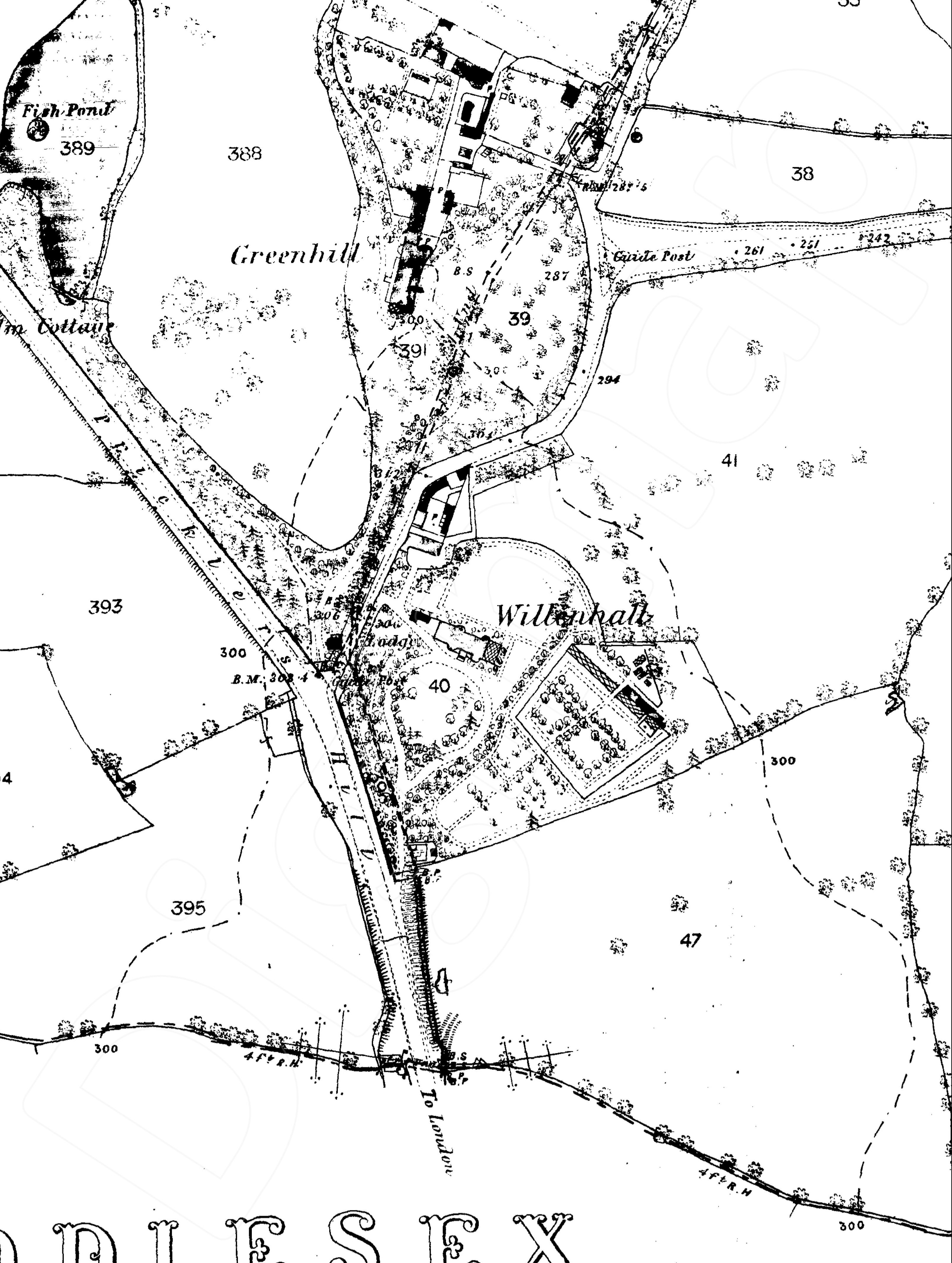
Willenhall (centre) on an 1860s Ordnance Survey map with Greenhill to the north

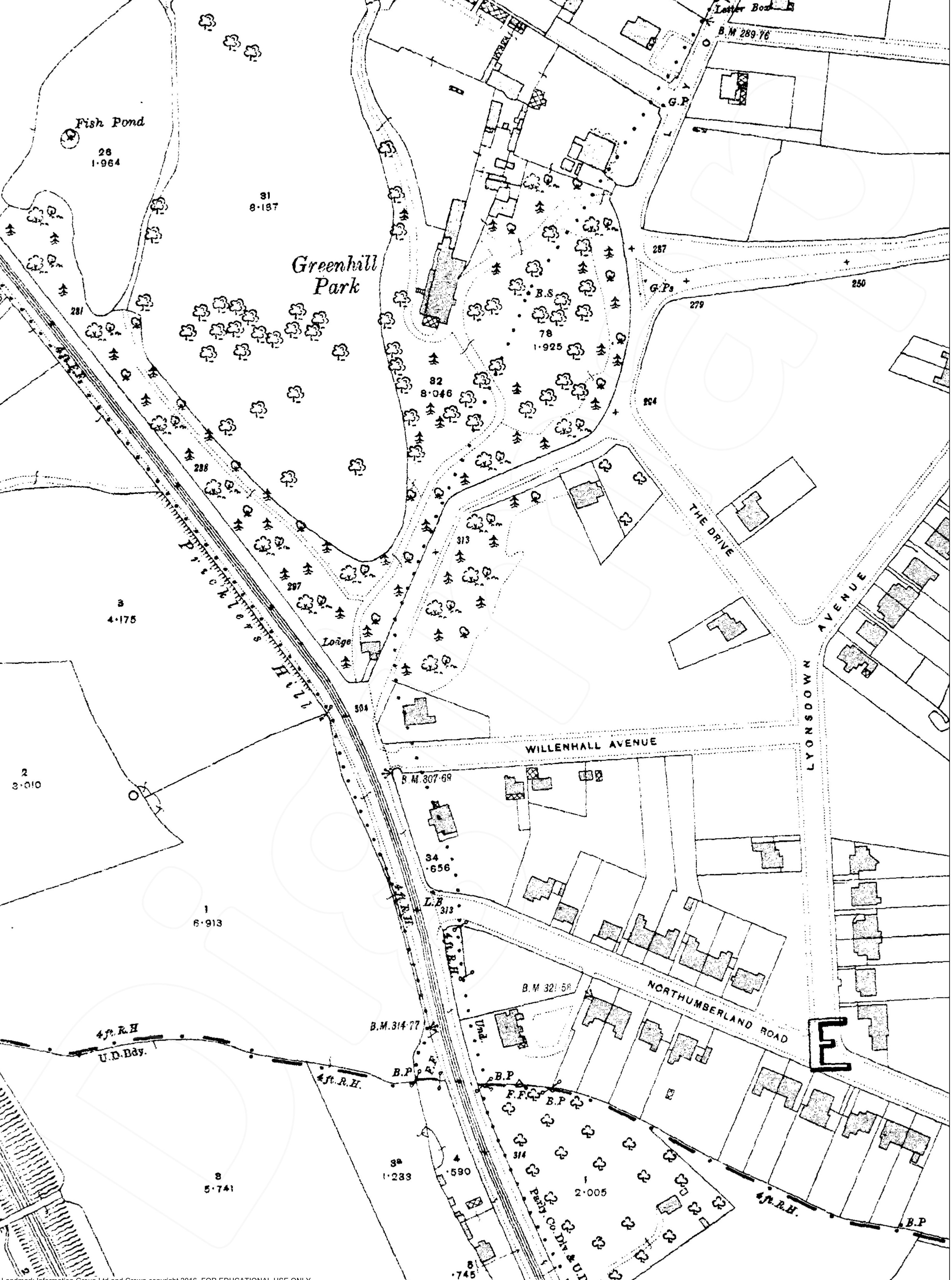
Ordnance Survey map, 1910s

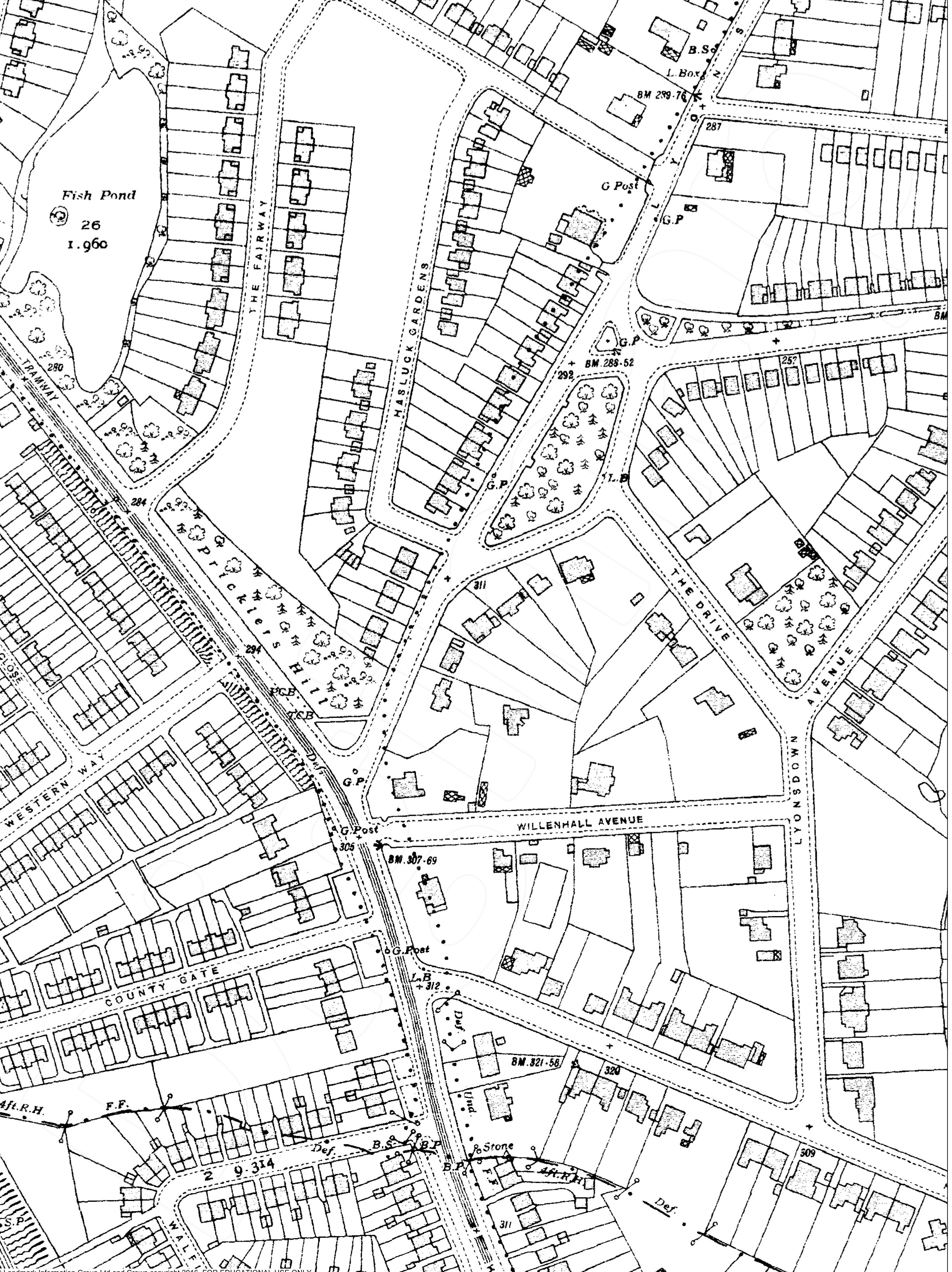
Ordnance Survey map, 1930s

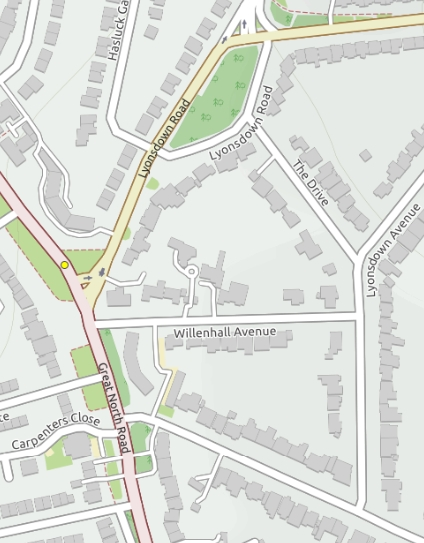
OpenStreetMap, 2020

== See also ==
- Greenhill Gardens, New Barnet
