= Hugh Moore (police officer) =

British police officer (1929–1993)

- Born: 18 October 1929
- Died: 4 December 1993 (aged 64); Bushey, Hertfordshire, England
- Police career
- Department: City of London Police
- Service years: 1955–1993
- Rank: Commander
- Awards: Queen's Police Medal

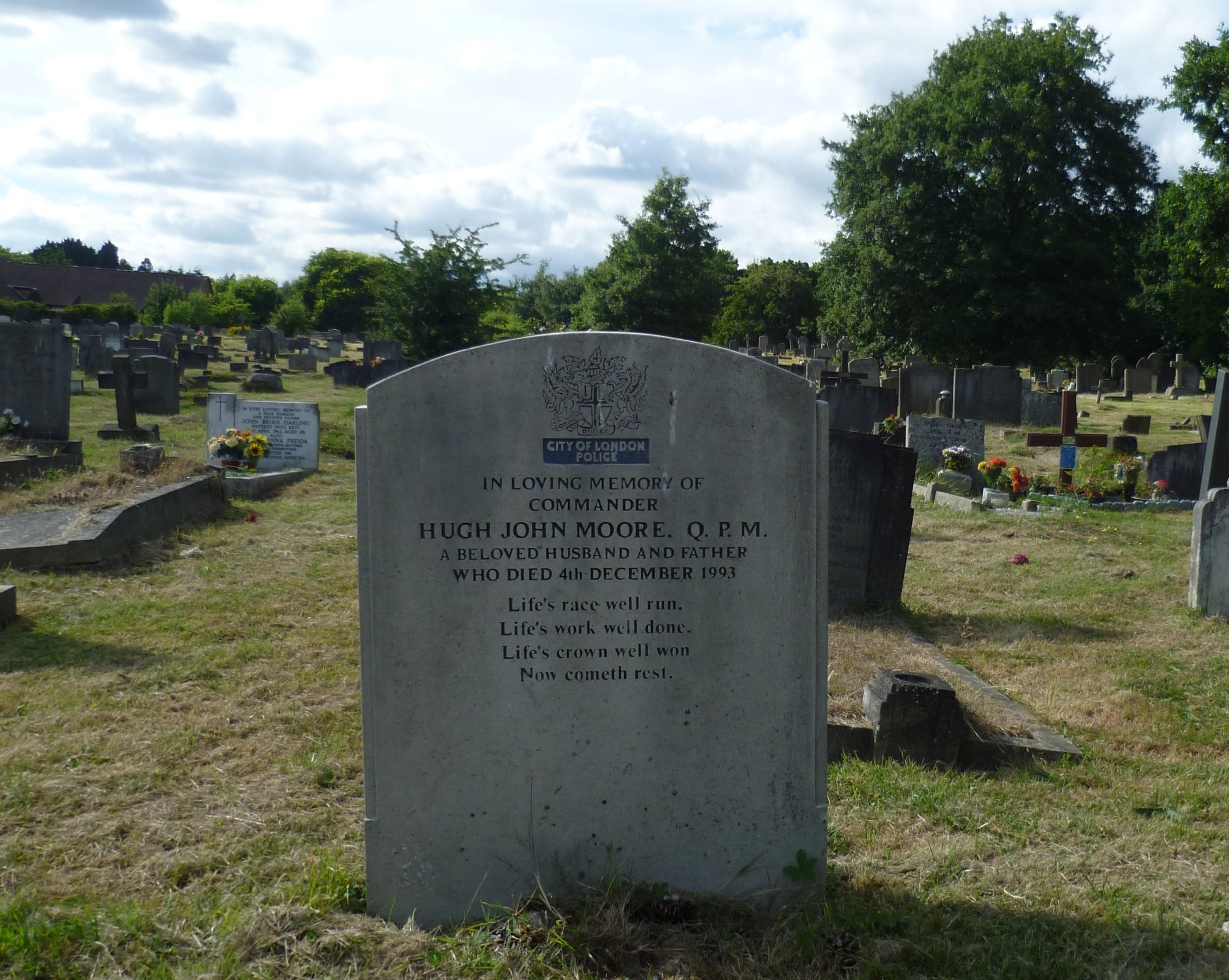
Hugh Moore's grave at Bells Hill Burial Ground, Chipping Barnet.

Commander Hugh John Moore, QPM (18 October 1929 – 4 December 1993) was a British police officer in the City of London Police who died from heart failure on 4 December 1993, two weeks after a violent struggle with a man whom he had attempted to arrest.

== Career ==
Moore joined the police force in 1955, following a period of National Service in the Royal Air Force and the Royal Naval Volunteer Reserve. He was a member of the Criminal Investigation Department of the City of London Police, but also served in the City Fraud Squad and Regional Crime Squads, and was promoted through the ranks. As Commander, he oversaw the investigation into the death of Roberto Calvi, dubbed "God's Banker", in June 1982.

In July that year, Moore gave evidence in the trial of two City of London Police officers, held as part of Operation Countryman, in which he denied corruption allegations made by one of the defendants. The allegations had been made on a secret tape recording, though the defendant, DCI Phil Cuthbert, had subsequently withdrawn them on the grounds that he had been drunk at the time they were made. John Simmonds, formerly part of the Metropolitan Police's A10 anti-corruption unit, stated that Moore was "bent and crooked" and could have been the inspiration for "H", the fictional corrupt "cop at the top" in the BBC television drama series Line of Duty. Another officer, Dick Kirby, wrote that Moore "championed the cause of officers who were thought to be crooked, denigrated those who were straight".

Moore was also involved with the police investigations into the collapses of the Bank of Credit and Commerce International and the Maxwell empire. He was awarded the Queen's Police Medal in the 1992 New Year's Honours. He oversaw the establishment of the ring of steel surrounding the City of London in 1993. Over his career, he received eleven commendations from commissioners and judges for his work.

== Death ==
On 19 November 1993, Moore attempted to arrest a man he suspected to be a bogus charity worker collecting for Great Ormond Street Hospital. During the arrest, he suffered cuts to his face, arms and legs, and was admitted to hospital eleven days later. He died, aged 64, from heart failure in a private hospital in Bushey, Hertfordshire, on 4 December 1993, and was survived by his widow, Connie, and son, Roger. He had been due to retire that September. His funeral was held on 16 December at St. John the Baptist Church, High Barnet. He is buried at Bells Hill Burial Ground, Chipping Barnet.

The Commissioner of the City of London Police, Owen Kelly, described him as "one of the most professionally accomplished police officers I have ever known", and as a "modest man" who "would be the last to mention his own achievements". He said: "His death is a great loss to this force and he will be sadly missed by all who knew him."

A coroner later ruled that Moore had been unlawfully killed, and the police inquiry into his death was subsequently stepped up to a murder inquiry.

== See also ==
- List of British police officers killed in the line of duty
