= John Oliver Brook Hitch =

English architect & British Army officer & MC (1887-1953)

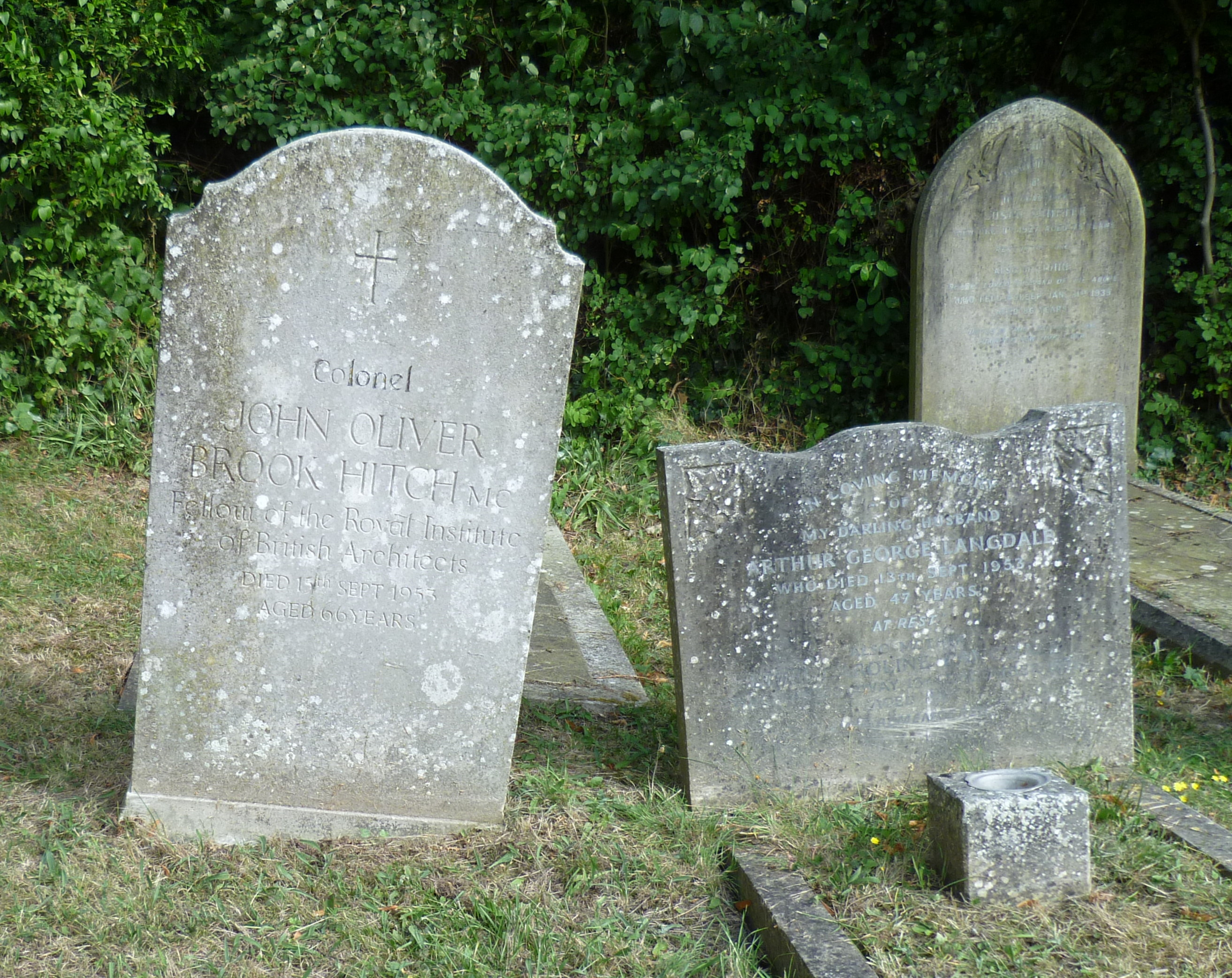
Hitch's grave at Bells Hill Burial Ground, Chipping Barnet. (left)

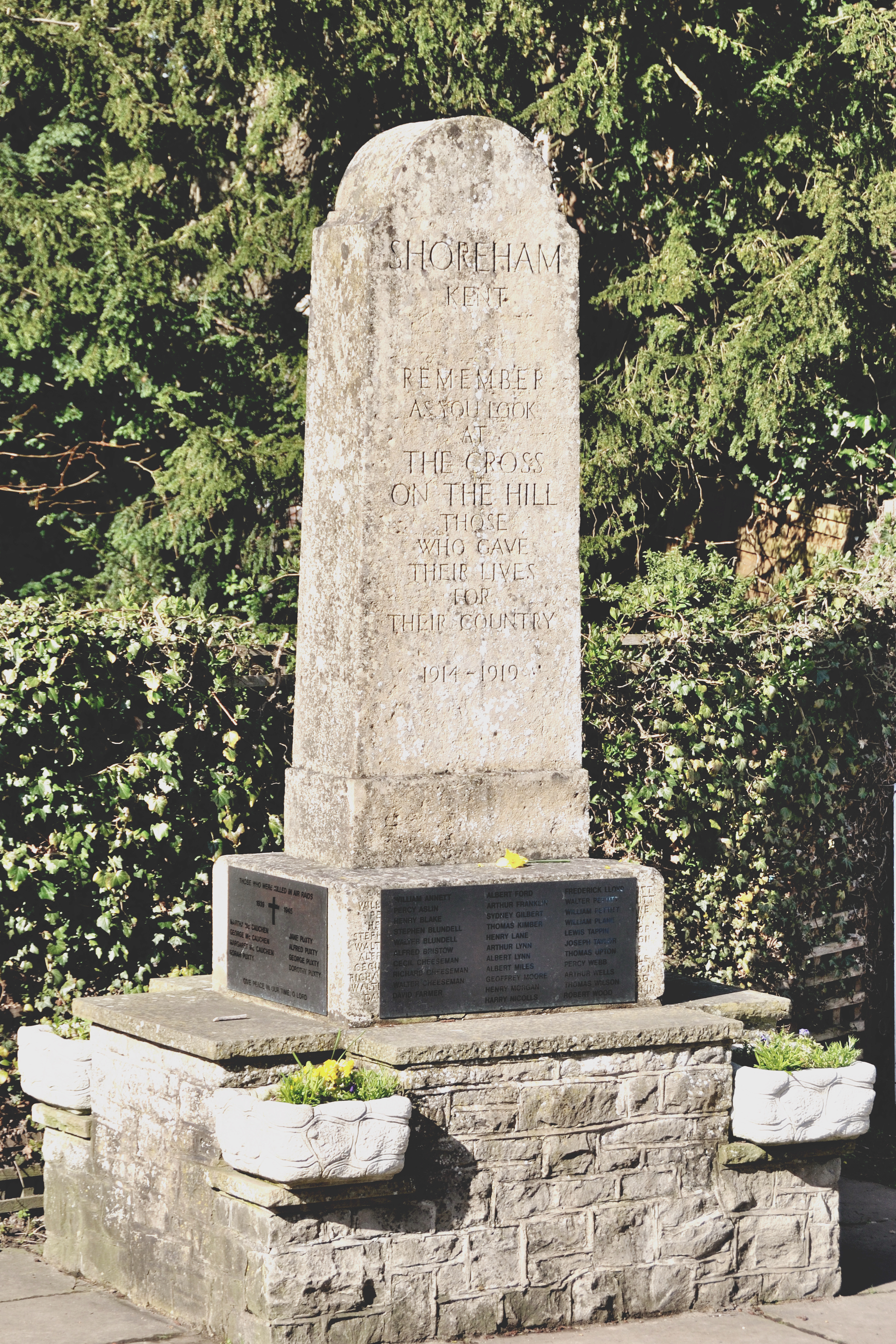
Shoreham War Memorial, designed by John Hitch.

Colonel John Oliver Brook Hitch (1887 – 15 September 1953) was an English architect and a British Army officer who was awarded the Military Cross.

== Early life ==
John Oliver Brook Hitch was born in Harleyford Road, Lambeth, London, in 1887 to Nathaniel and Sarah Ann Hitch. His father was an architectural sculptor and mason. John had four sisters according to the 1911 census when the family were living at 60 Harleyford Road, Lambeth.

== Career ==
Hitch served in the British Army during the First World War, rising to the rank of colonel and being awarded the Military Cross.

In architecture, he designed Shoreham war memorial (opened 1920) in Kent, and the chalk war memorial at Cross Field, Shoreham (opened 1921). He designed the animal clinic at Kilburn, London, which was opened in 1932 and included decorative sculptures by Frederick Brook Hitch.

== Death ==
Hitch died on 15 September 1953 and is buried at Bells Hill Burial Ground, Chipping Barnet.
