= William Henry Wyatt =

- Born: 22 February 1823; Bloomsbury, London
- Died: 6 January 1898 (aged 74)
- Resting place: Highgate Cemetery

Sir William Henry Wyatt (1823-1898) was Magistrate and Deputy Lieutenant for Middlesex, and social reformer in his role of Chairman of both the Middlesex County Lunatic Asylum at Colney Hatch and the Metropolitan Asylum for Chronic Imbeciles at Leavesden, Hertfordshire.

== Biography ==
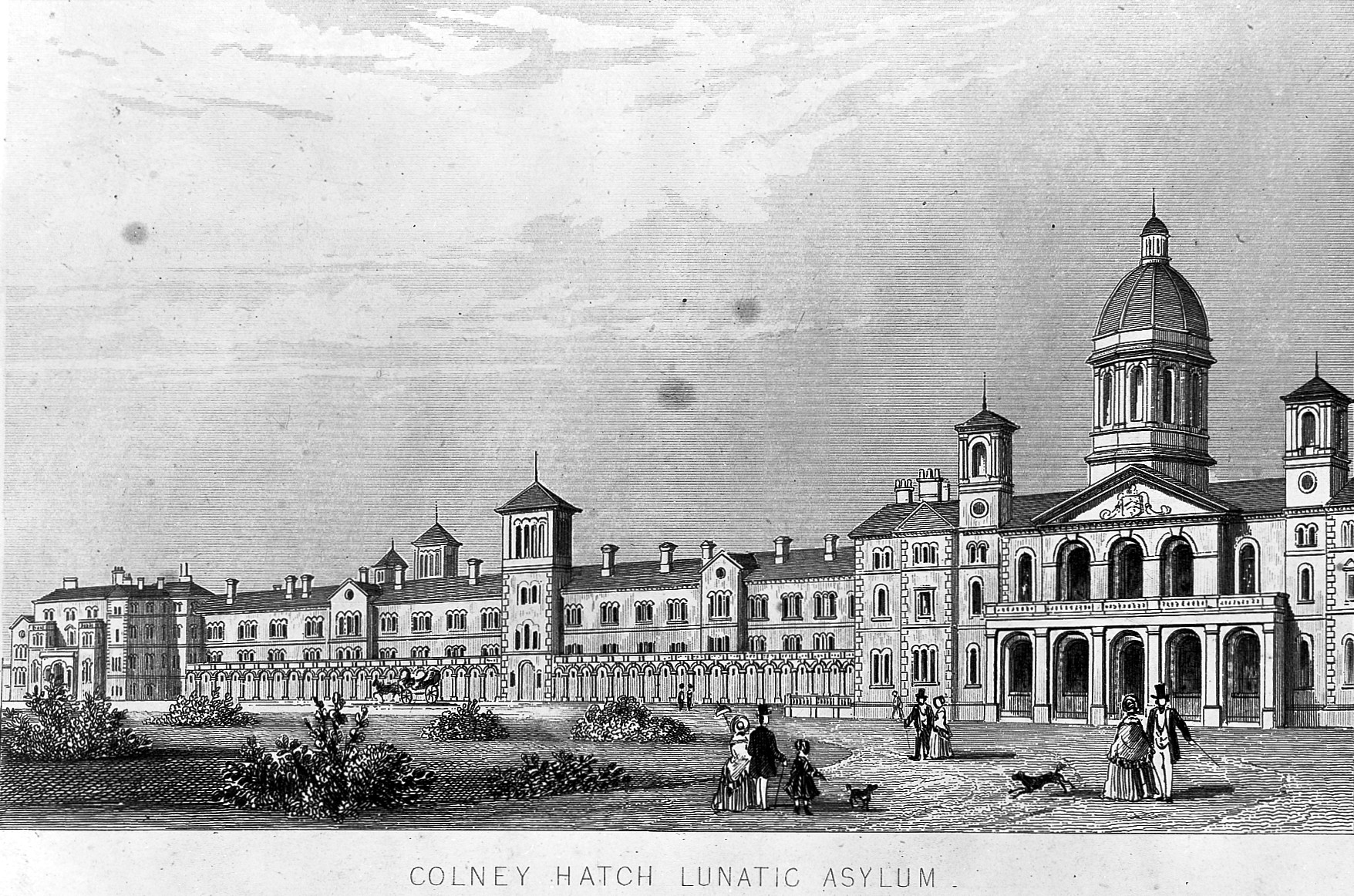
Colney Hatch Lunatic Asylum

William Wyatt was born on 22 February 1823, the son of Thomas Wyatt, an East Indies merchant, of Willenhall, Warwickshire & East Barnet, Hertfordshire and his wife Elizabeth Reeves.

Wyatt's income mainly derived from railway investments and being a residential landlord, as well as chairmanship of two waterworks companies, but he is best known for his work with the mentally unwell. He joined the governing board (the Committee of Visitors) of the Middlesex County Lunatic Asylum in 1860, rising to be its chairman in 1862, a post which he held until 1889. He was also chairman of the Metropolitan Asylum for Chronic Imbeciles at Leavesden, Hertfordshire, which opened ten years later in 1870.

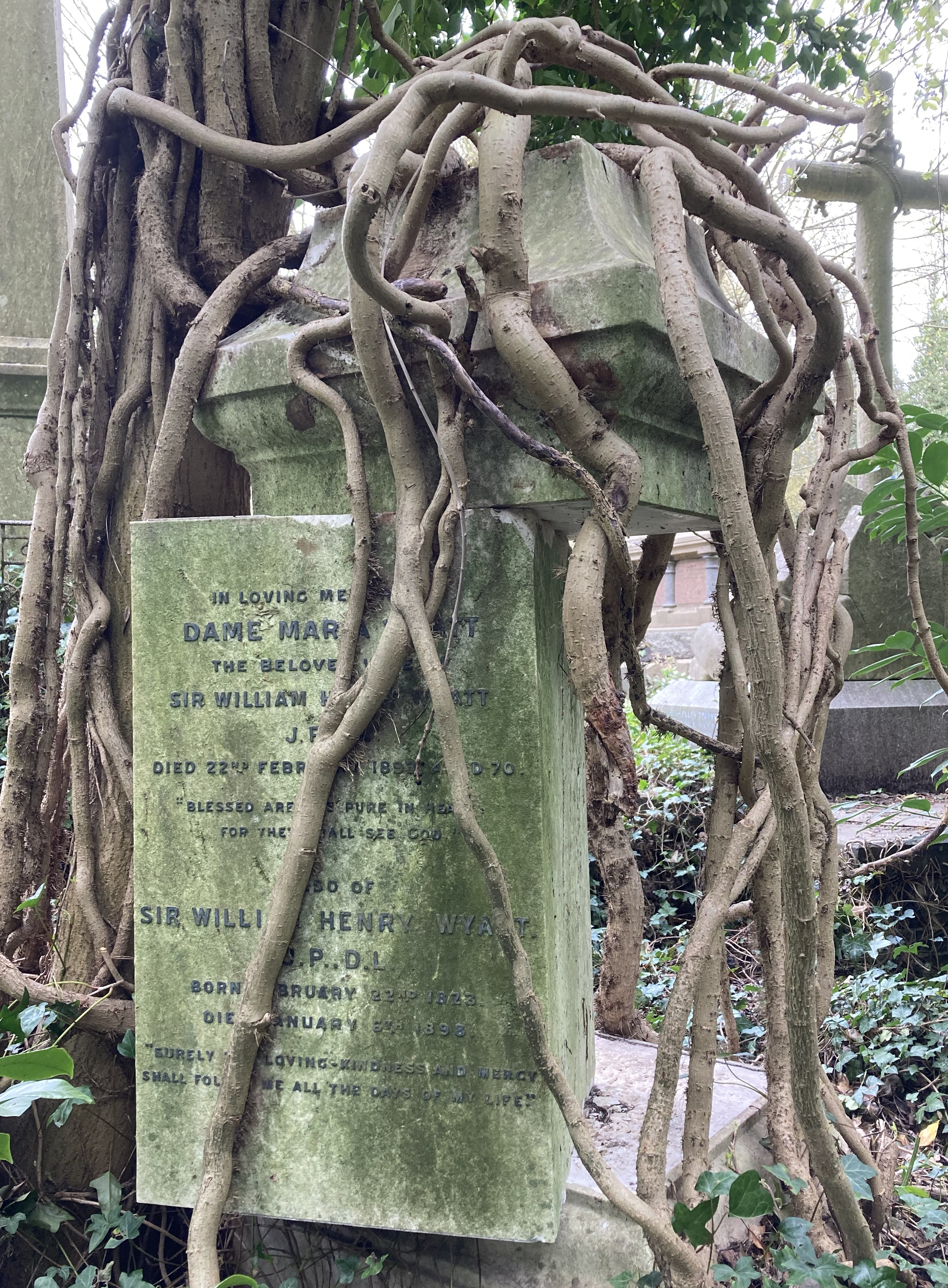
Grave of William Henry Wyatt in Highgate Cemetery

He married Maria Wild (1822-1893) on 18 April 1844, daughter of Henry and Maria Wild, and they had eight children, seven daughters and a son.

Wyatt was knighted in 1876 for his long public service on various committees.

He died on 6 January 1898, leaving an estate valued at £93,521 and is buried with his wife, who died five years earlier, on the west side of Highgate Cemetery.
