= Thomas Wyatt (merchant) =

British merchant (c.1783 - 1834)

- Born: c. 1783; Willenhall
- Died: 6 April 1834; London
- Occupation: East Indies merchant
- Children: Sir William Henry Wyatt (1823-1898)

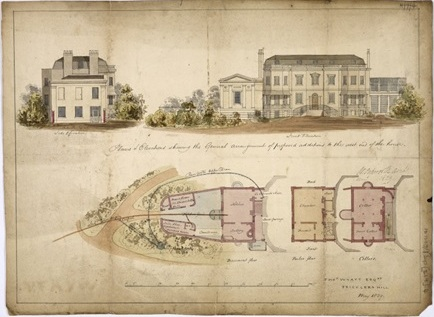
Designs for Willenhall House by John Buonarotti Papworth, 1829.

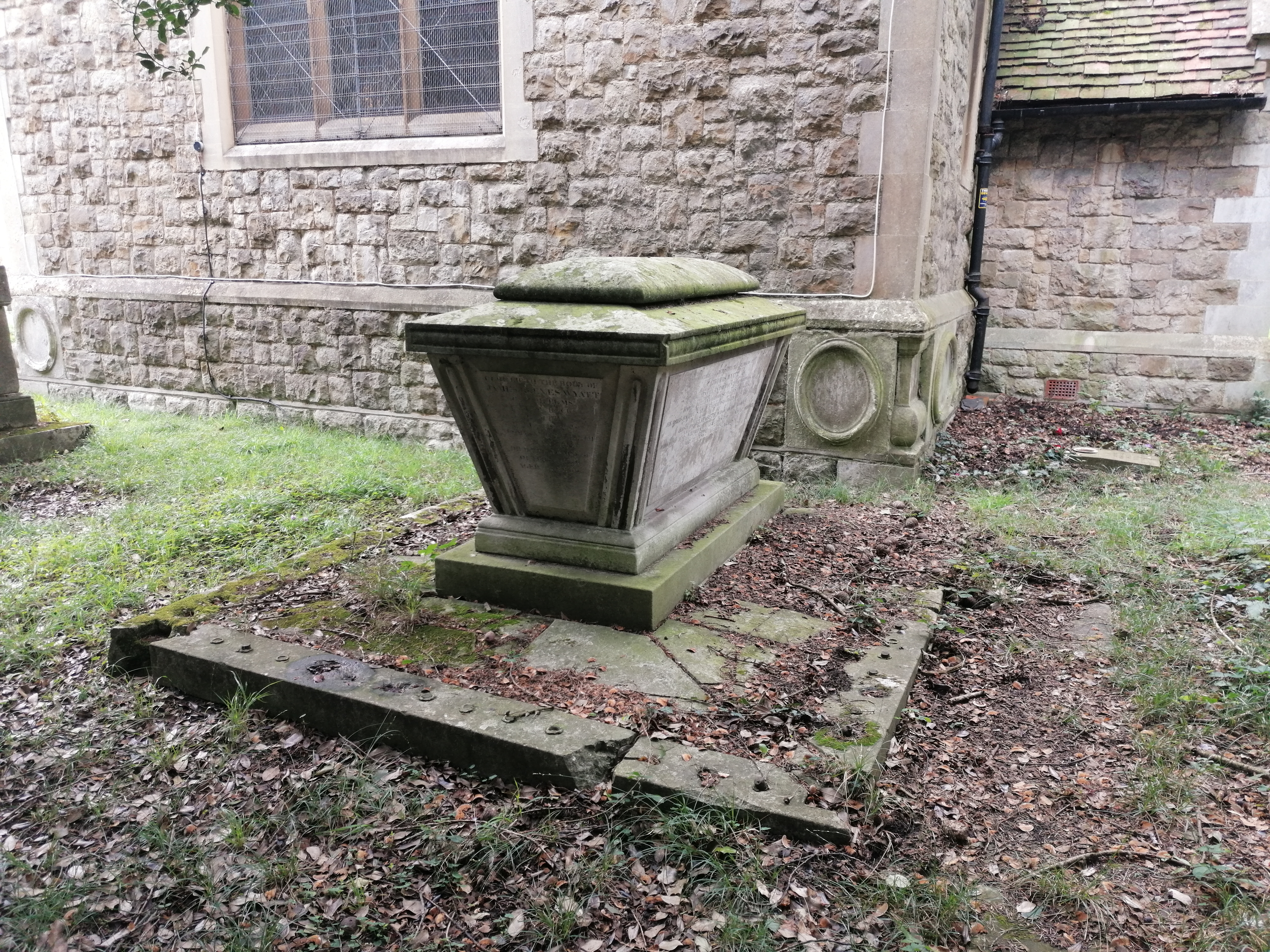
Thomas Wyatt's grave at St Mary the Virgin church, East Barnet.

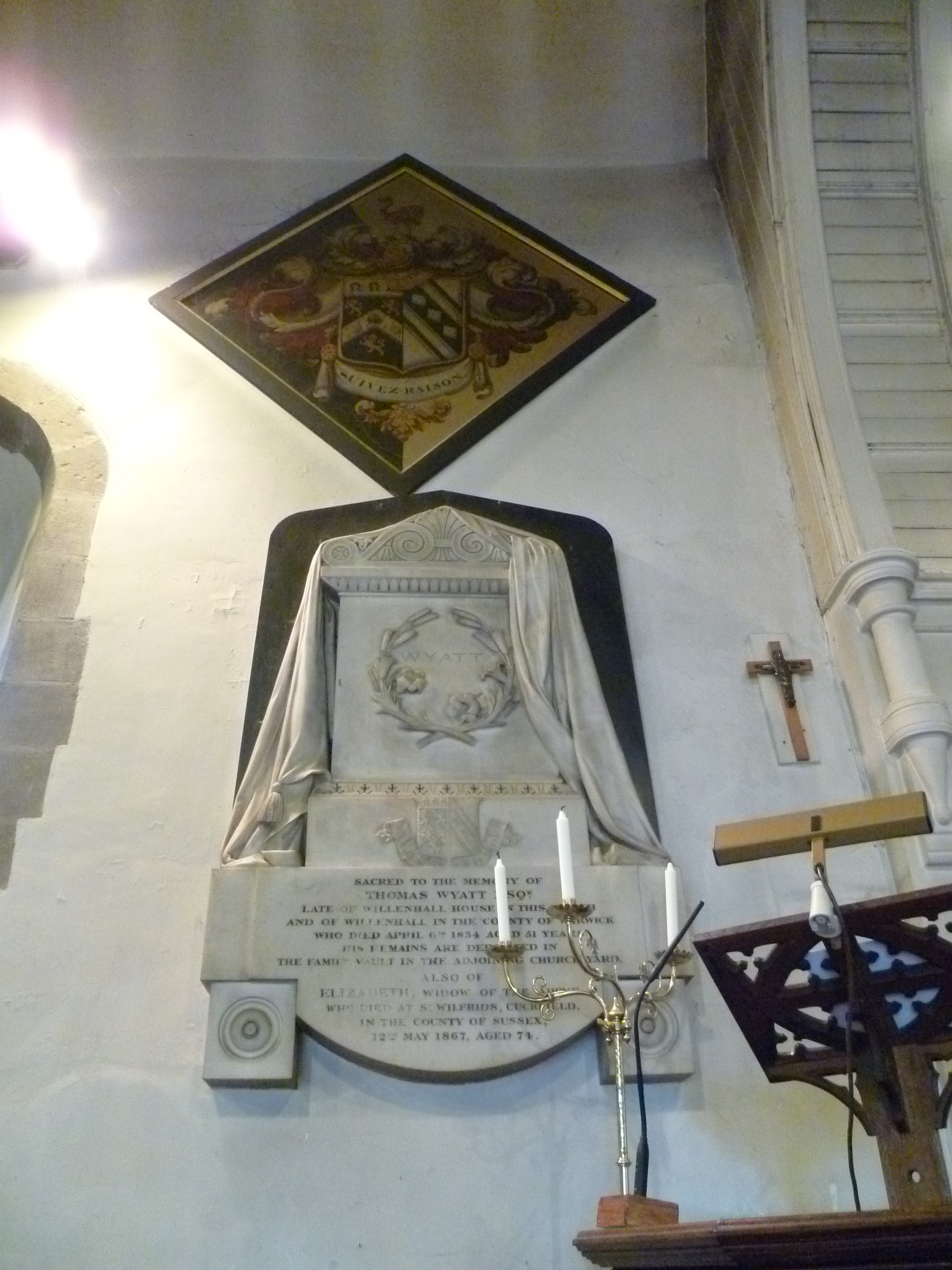
Memorial plaque to Thomas and Elizabeth Wyatt at St Mary the Virgin

Thomas Wyatt (c. 1783 – 6 April 1834) was an East Indies merchant from Willenhall in the English Midlands. He commissioned Willenhall House from John Buonarotti Papworth in 1829 which was built on an estate that he purchased in north London and which he named Willenhall.

== Early life and family ==
Thomas Wyatt was born around 1783 in Willenhall, Warwickshire. He married Elizabeth Reeves, who was born in London around 1793. Their children included Maria who died as an infant in 1820, Thomas who died aged 15 in 1831, Eliza who died in 1847 aged 31, James who died in 1856 aged 42, and William Henry Wyatt (1823-1898), later Sir William, who was for thirty years chairman of the County Lunatic Asylum, Colney Hatch.

== Career ==
Wyatt traded as an East Indies merchant.

Around 1820 he purchased Belle Vue in Barnet that he replaced with Willenhall House which was designed by John Buonarotti Papworth in 1829. He named the new house after his place of birth.

== Death and legacy ==
Thomas Wyatt died on 6 April 1834 at the age of 51 in London's Hanover Square. He is buried in the family vault at St Mary the Virgin church, East Barnet. Elizabeth died at St Wilfrids, Cuckfield, Sussex, on 12 May 1867, aged 74. Probate was granted to his son Sir William Henry Wyatt (1823-1898) and to Robert Edward Wyatt.
