= Bells Hill Burial Ground =

Cemetery in Greater London, England

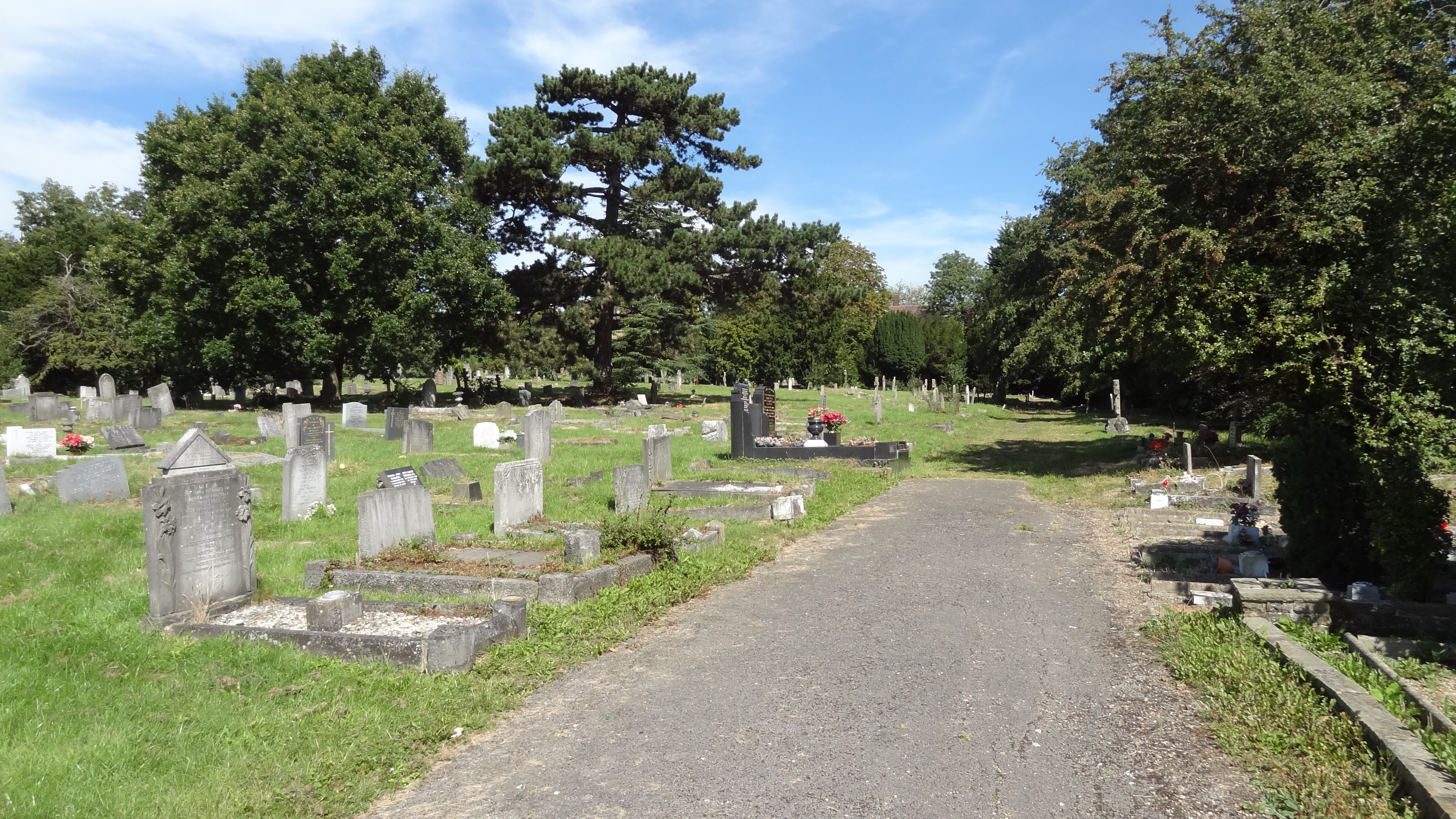
- Interactive map of Bells Hill Burial Ground

Details
- Established: 1895
- Closed: 2005
- Location: Spring Close, London Borough of Barnet
- Country: England
- Coordinates: 51.6487°N 0.2143°W
- Owned by: Barnet London Borough Council
- Size: 3.3 hectares (8.2 acres)

Bells Hill Burial Ground is a cemetery and Site of Local Importance for Nature Conservation in the Parish of Chipping Barnet in the London Borough of Barnet. It was opened in 1895 and closed in 2005 when it officially became full (although occasional burials still take place). In 2006 control was passed to Barnet Council. There is access from Spring Close.

== Burials ==
Among the interments at Bells Hill is Albert Edward Curtis (1866–1940), who was awarded the Victoria Cross for his rescue of a severely injured senior officer under heavy fire during the Second Boer War. The burial ground also includes 45 Commonwealth War Graves – 21 from World War I and 24 from World War II.

== Natural environment ==
The north-eastern part of the site has older monuments and is wooded with a variety of trees, including mature cedar and yew. Wildflowers include common knapweed and lady's bedstraw, while brambles and roses climb the tombs in wilder areas. The burial ground is a good site for butterflies, such as gatekeeper, small skipper and meadow brown. The south-western area is more managed with mown grass, and some graves have flowers. The burial ground attracts birds typical of such suburban sites: jackdaws, magpies, starlings and green woodpeckers forage in the grassy areas, and the more wooded section attracts ring-necked parakeets, tits, warblers and other woodland birds. Larger mammals include grey squirrel and red fox, which breed within the cemetery.

== Access ==
The original main entrance – a roofed brick gateway on Bells Hill (opposite Dellors Close) – is usually kept locked, but there are two entrances in Spring Close. Visitors can park here for up to an hour without needing a permit. Anyone requiring a permit for a longer stay should phone the Parish of Chipping Barnet office.

The lower entrance leads to a wide track adjacent to Bells Hill as far as the original main gate; the upper entrance leads to a parallel path across the centre of the site. These two are linked by two cross-paths. Leading northwest from the central track are two narrow dead-end paths to the boundary with the Barnet Hospital campus. There is no laid-out route connecting the ends of these paths, but it is easy to cross the short distance from one to the other to complete a walk without having to retrace one’s steps.

== Notable interments ==
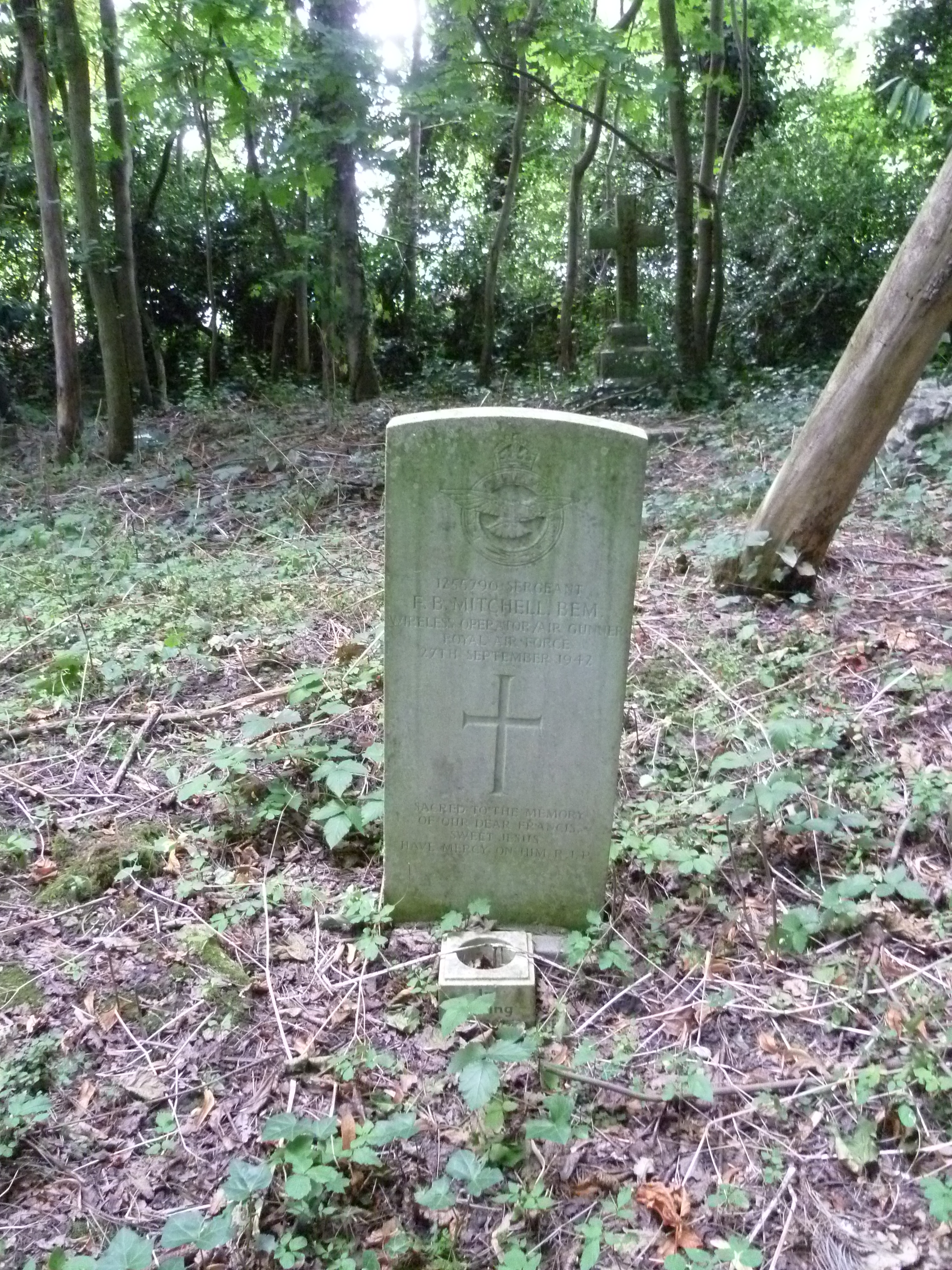
Frank B. Mitchell's grave at Bells Hill

- Albert Edward Curtis, awarded the Victoria Cross.
- Lancelot Gerald Hasluck, founder of the housing charity the Lancelot Hasluck Trust.
- John Oliver Brook Hitch, architect, awarded the Military Cross
- Francis Beaumont Mitchell, awarded the British Empire Medal for gallantry in 1942 after crawling 2–3 miles from the wreckage of his aircraft to raise the alarm after it crashed on a training flight.
- Hugh Moore, awarded the Queen's Police Medal.
- Kenneth Ian Thornton, awarded the Distinguished Flying Cross.

== See also ==
- Barnet parks and open spaces
- Nature reserves in Barnet
