= William Alpheus Higgs =

British Sheriff

- Born: c. 1838; Luckington, Wiltshire, UK
- Died: 23 December 1889; London, UK
- Occupation: Merchant

William Alpheus Higgs (c. 1838 – 23 December 1889) was a London tea merchant who served as sheriff of London and Middlesex in 1887. He was a liveryman of several of the city's guilds and at the time of his death had been selected as a Radical candidate for a parliamentary constituency in north London.

== Early life and family ==
William Alpheus Higgs was baptised 0n 24 June 1838 in Luckington, Wiltshire. He married Phoebe and the 1881 census shows them living in St Pancras, London, with their eight sons and two daughters.

== Career ==
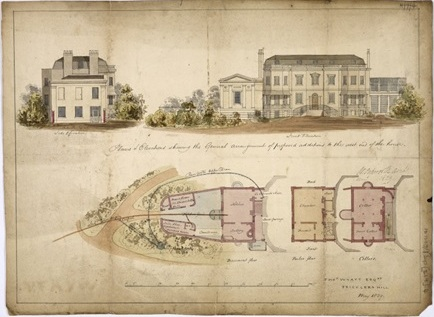
Designs for Willenhall House, Pricklers Hill, Barnet

Higgs was a partner in Barber & Company, tea merchants of London, Liverpool, Manchester, and Bristol. He also traded as William Alpheus Higgs & Company, tea, wine, and spirits importers and grocers with multiple premises in London. He was a liveryman of several of the city's guilds and in June 1887 was elected as a sheriff of London and Middlesex.

In the late 19th century he bought Willenhall House in Pricklers Hill, north London, from T. G. Waterhouse, and at the time of his death had been selected as a Radical candidate for a parliamentary constituency in the area.

== Death and legacy ==
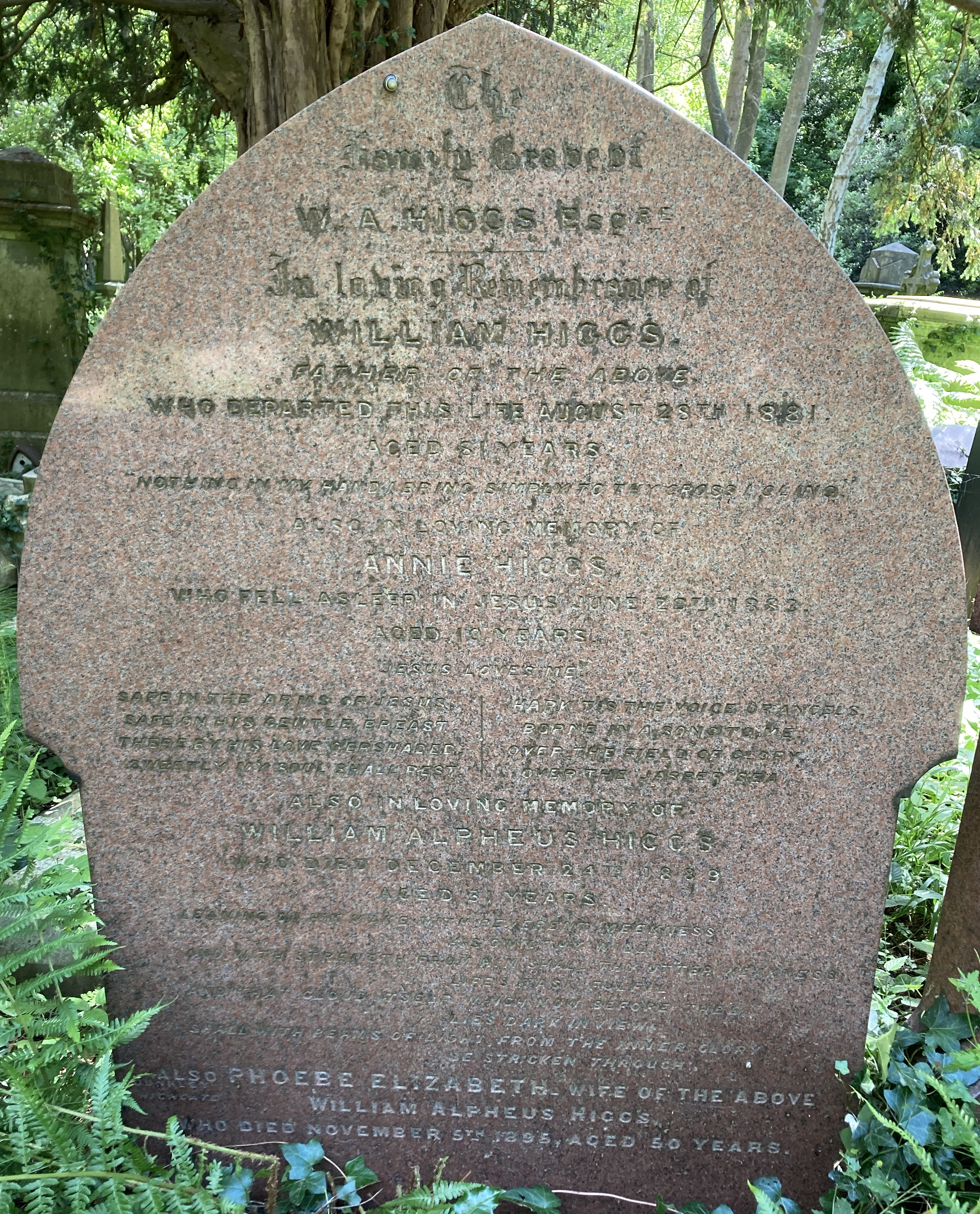
Grave of William Higgs in Highgate Cemetery

Higgs died of apoplexy at midnight on the 23 December 1889 at the Hotel Victoria in London where he was about to set off with his wife and sons for the Lady Mayoress's ball. In 1907 his arms were carried by the Worshipful Company of Glovers in the procession of the Lord Mayor's Show. He was buried on the western side of Highgate Cemetery.
