= Albert Edward Curtis =

Recipient of the Victoria Cross (1866–1940)

Albert Edward Curtis VC
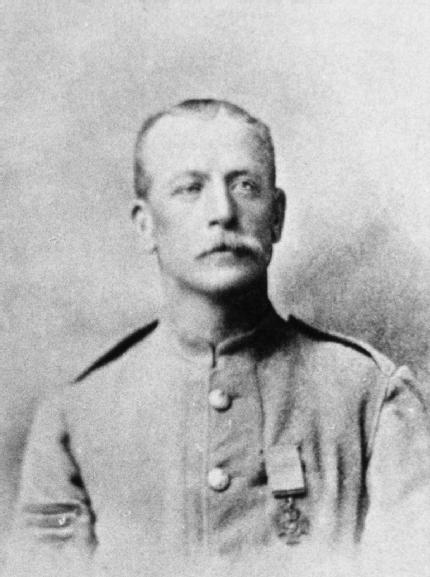
- Born: 6 January 1866; Guildford, Surrey
- Died: 18 March 1940 (aged 74); Barnet, London
- Burial place: Bells Hill Cemetery, Barnet
- Military career
- Allegiance: United Kingdom
- Branch: British Army
- Rank: Sergeant
- Commands: The East Surrey Regiment
- Conflicts: Second Boer War
- Awards: Victoria Cross
- Other work: Yeoman Warder

Albert Edward Curtis VC (6 January 1866 – 18 March 1940) was an English recipient of the Victoria Cross, the highest and most prestigious award for gallantry in the face of the enemy that can be awarded to British and Commonwealth forces.

== Details ==
Curtis was 34 years old, and a private in the 2nd Battalion, The East Surrey Regiment, British Army during the Second Boer War when the following deed took place at Onderbank Spruit for which he was awarded the VC:

On 23 February 1900, Colonel Harris lay all day long in a perfectly open space under close fire of a Boer breastwork. The Boers fired all day at any man who moved, and Colonel Harris was wounded eight or nine times. Private Curtis, after several attempts succeeded in reaching the Colonel, bound his wounded arm, and gave him his flask – all under heavy fire. He then tried to carry him away, but was unable, on which he called for assistance, and Private Morton came out at once. Fearing that the men would be killed; Colonel Harris told them to leave him, but they declined, and after trying to carry the Colonel on their rifles, they made a chair with their hands, and so carried him out of fire.

== Further information ==
He later achieved the rank of sergeant and served as a Yeoman Warder. He died on 18 March 1940. His medal is in the Lord Ashcroft collection

Curtis is interred at Bells Hill Burial Ground, Chipping Barnet.
