= Greenhill estate =

Former house and estate in north London

Coordinates: 51.646°N 0.181°W

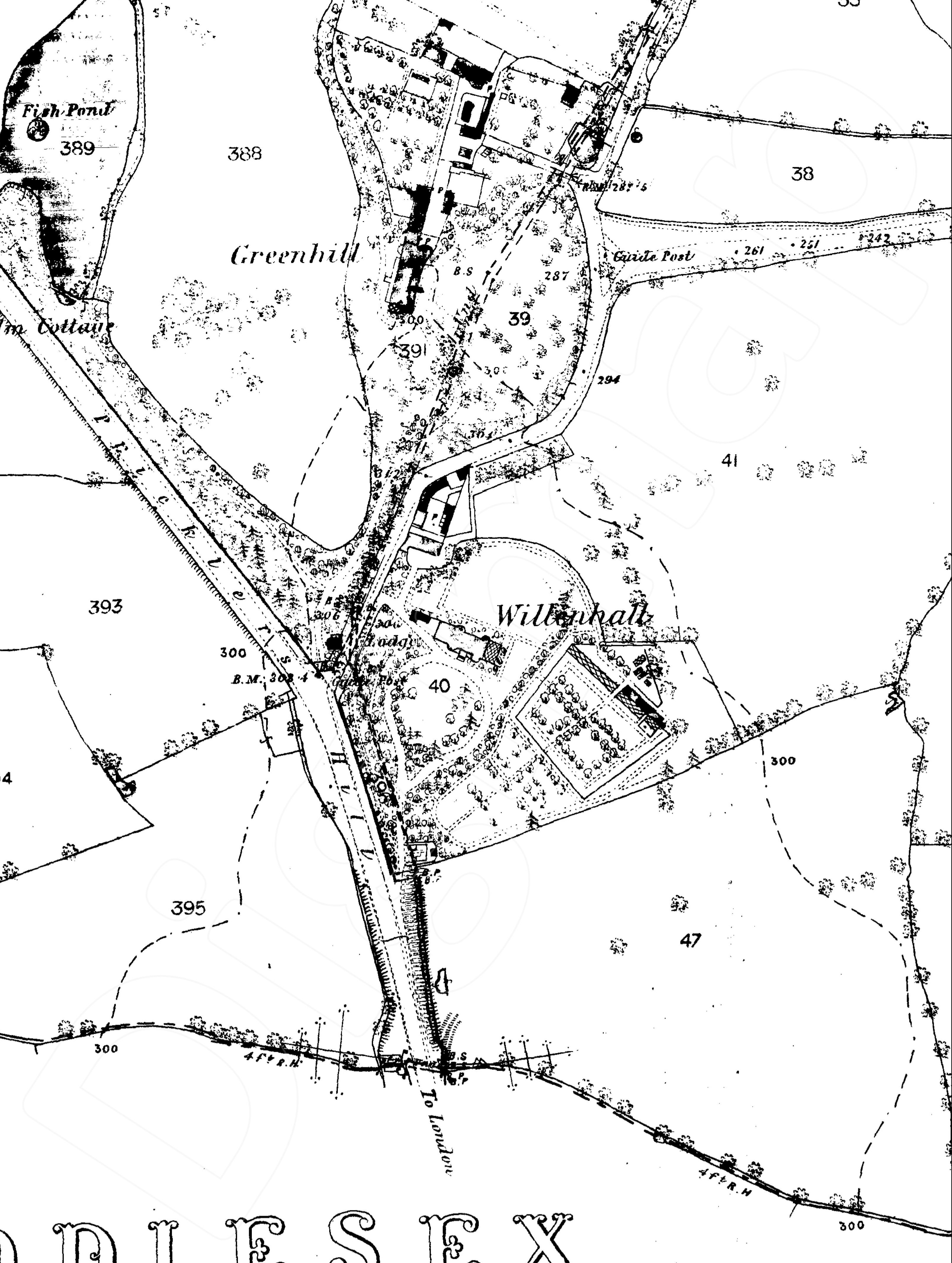
Greenhill (north) and Willenhall (centre) on an 1860s Ordnance Survey map

Greenhill was a house and estate on the site of the former Pricklers estate to the south of Chipping Barnet, on the borders of Hertfordshire and Middlesex, in what is now north London.

== History ==
Pricklers was a large country estate named after a medieval family called Prittle. The estate was owned by the descendants of John Marsh, passing to Margaret Marsh when her father Captain William Marsh died. She married firstly John Nicholl, having a daughter by this marriage also called Margaret, and as a widow in 1694 married John Woolfe, soon to be knighted. Sir John and Dame Margaret Woolfe had issue of three daughters and a son Marsh Woolfe.

On Dame Margaret's death in 1713 she left Pricklers to her son Marsh Woolfe, although he was then only thirteen years of age. Until he came of age, the estate was administered on his behalf by the executors of the will, namely Margaret Nicholl (Dame Margaret's daughter by a previous marriage) and John Godden Woolfe (Sir John Woolfe's son by a previous marriage).

At that time the house was always called Pricklers by the family. Marsh Woolfe in turn left his estate in 1748 to his half-nephew by blood Thomas Brand of The Hoo, the son of Dame Margaret Woolfe's daughter Margaret.

A watercolour painting of the house was made in about 1800.

Most of the land was developed for housing in the twentieth century. In 1926 East Barnet Council purchased the remaining land which is now Greenhill Gardens.

== See also ==
- Willenhall House
