= Greenhill Gardens, New Barnet =

Nature reserve in New Barnet, London, England

Coordinates: 51.6446°N 0.1824°W

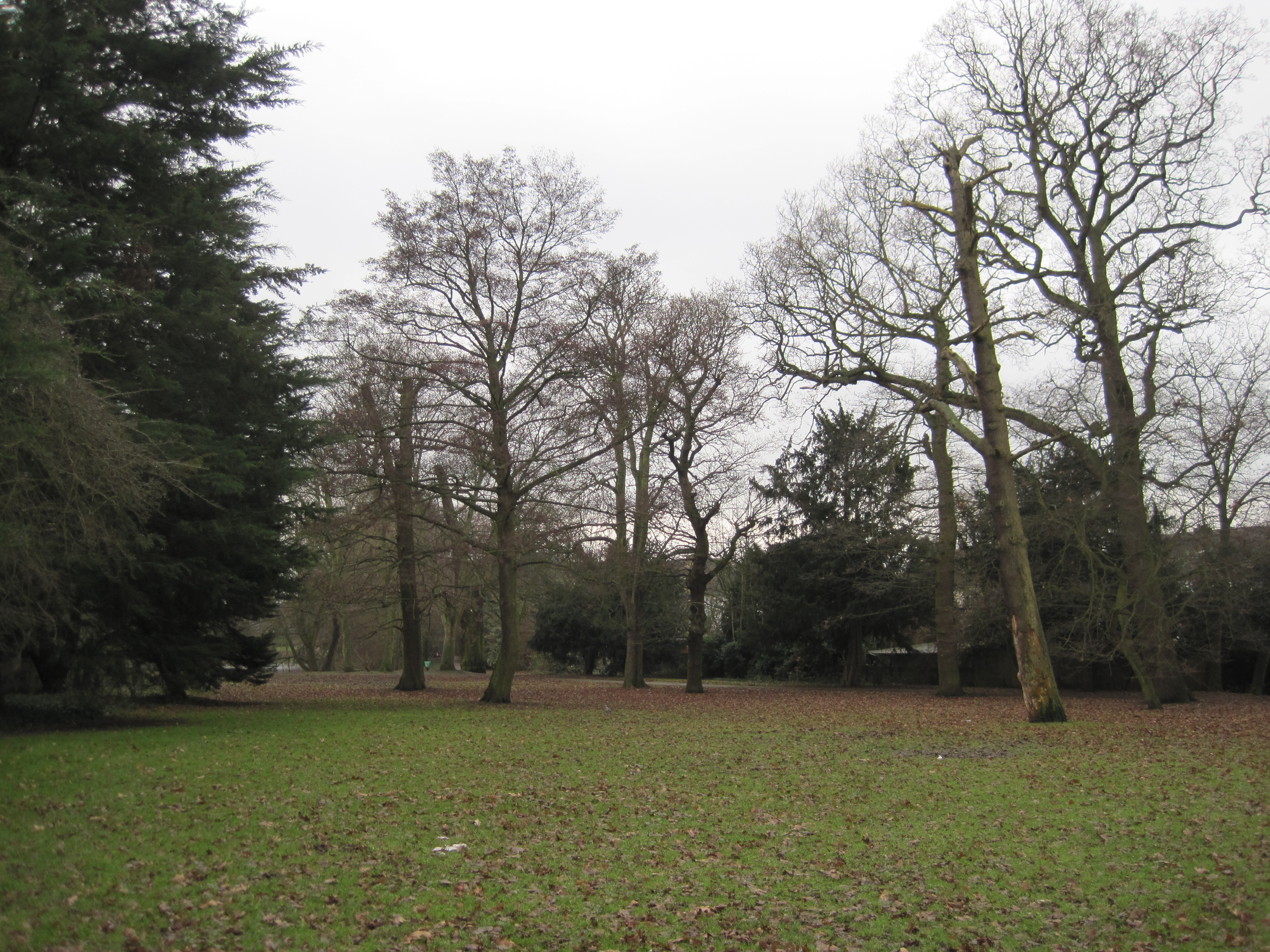
Greenhill Gardens in winter

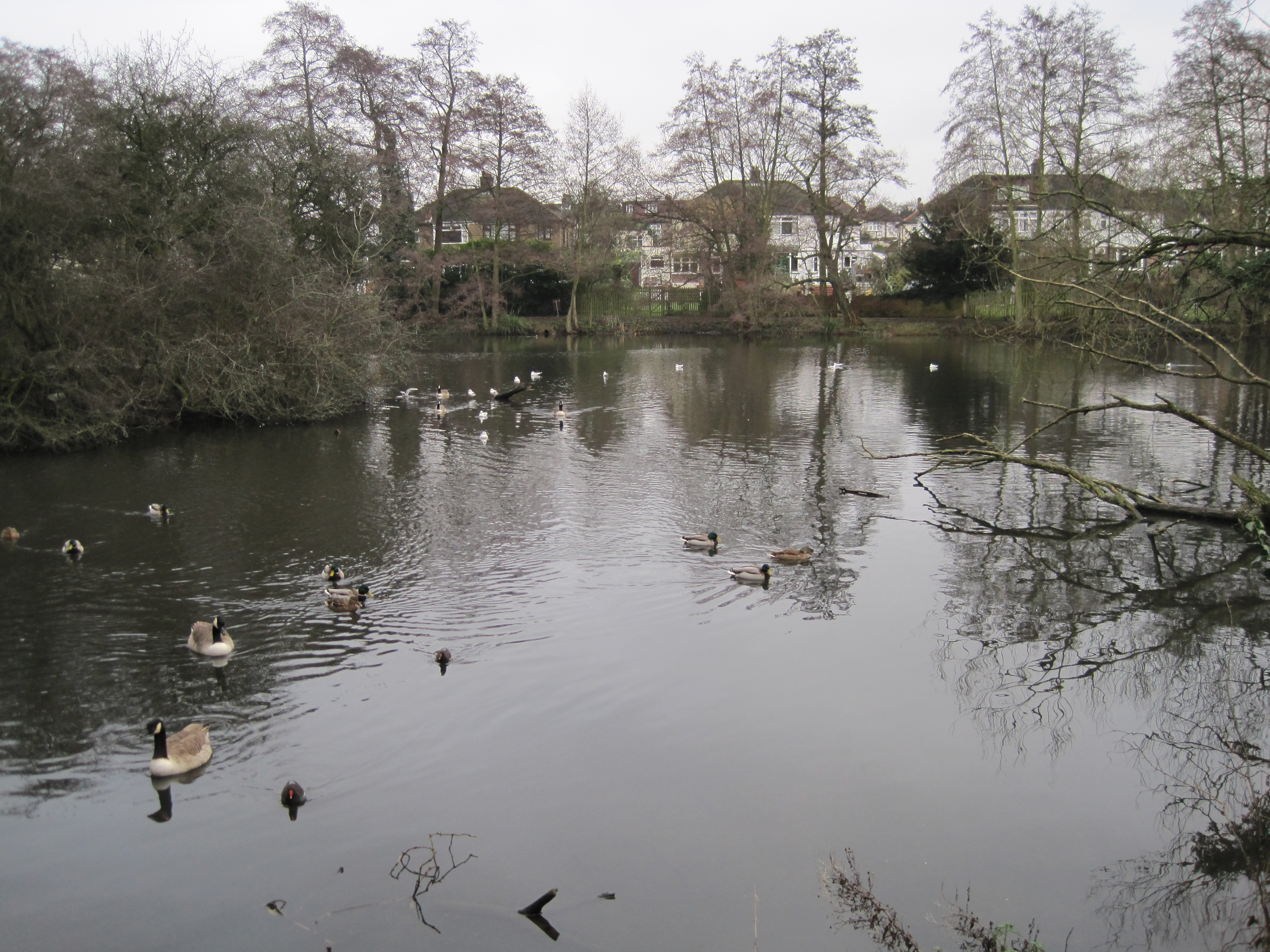
Greenhill Gardens lake

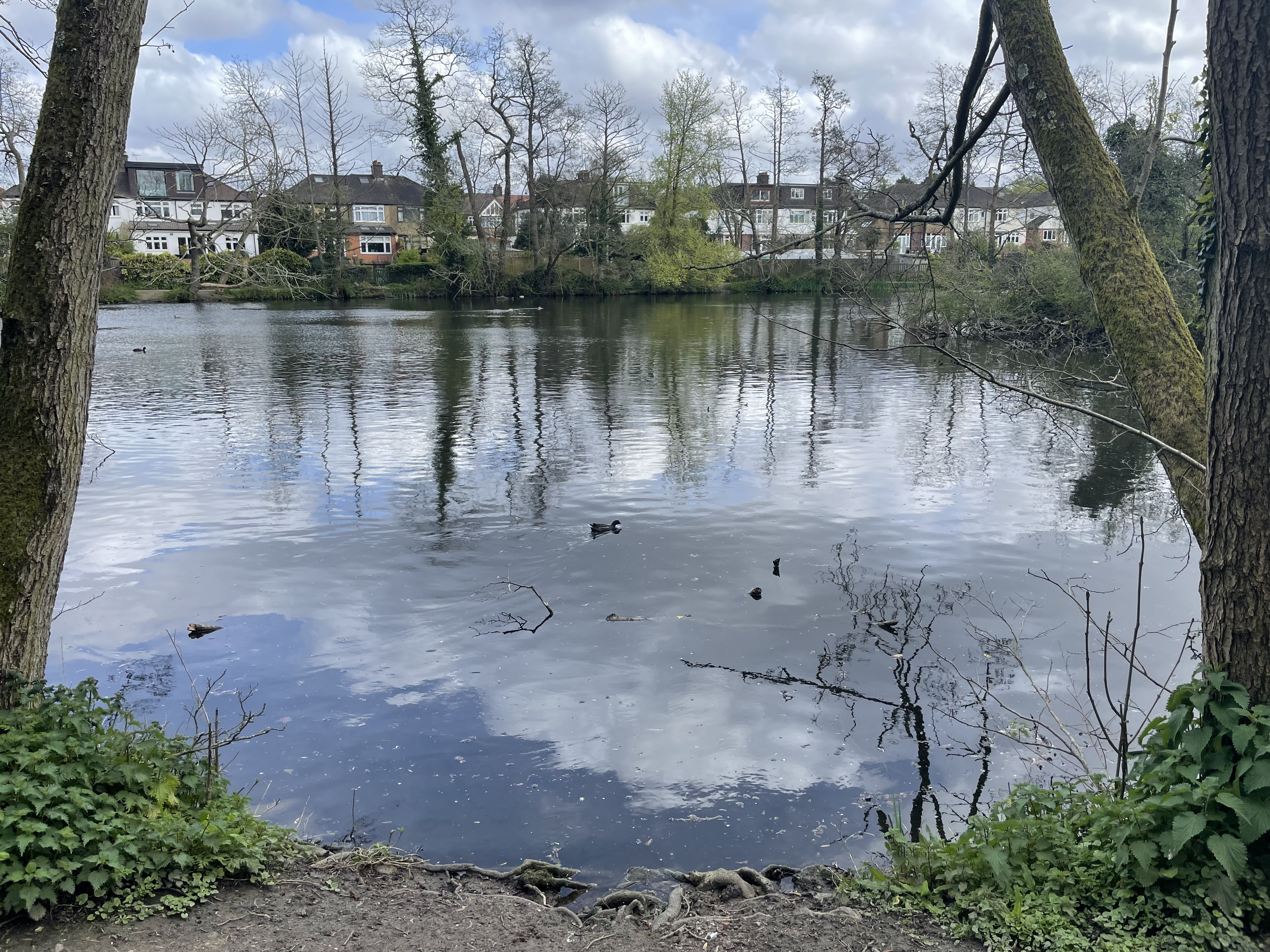
A view of the lake

Greenhill Gardens is a 1.6 hectare public park in High Barnet in the London Borough of Barnet. Its main feature is an ornamental lake with a wooded island, which attracts many birds, and it also has a grassed area with scattered mature trees. It is a site of local importance for nature conservation.

It was created from part of the former Greenhill estate, the rest of which was developed for housing in the twentieth century. In July 1926 East Barnet Council purchased the land which is now a public park for £20,000. In 1965 East Barnet became part of the London Borough of Barnet, which now owns and manages the park.

There is access from Pricklers Hill and Greenhill Park.

== See also ==
- Barnet parks and open spaces
- Nature reserves in Barnet
