= Charles Voysey =

Charles Voysey may refer to:

- Charles Voysey (theist) (1828–1912), English Anglican priest
- C. F. A. Voysey (Charles Francis Annesley Voysey, 1857–1941), English architect and furniture and textile designer
- Charles Cowles-Voysey (1889–1981), architect and son of the above
