= Watford Town Hall =

Municipal building in Watford, Hertfordshire, England

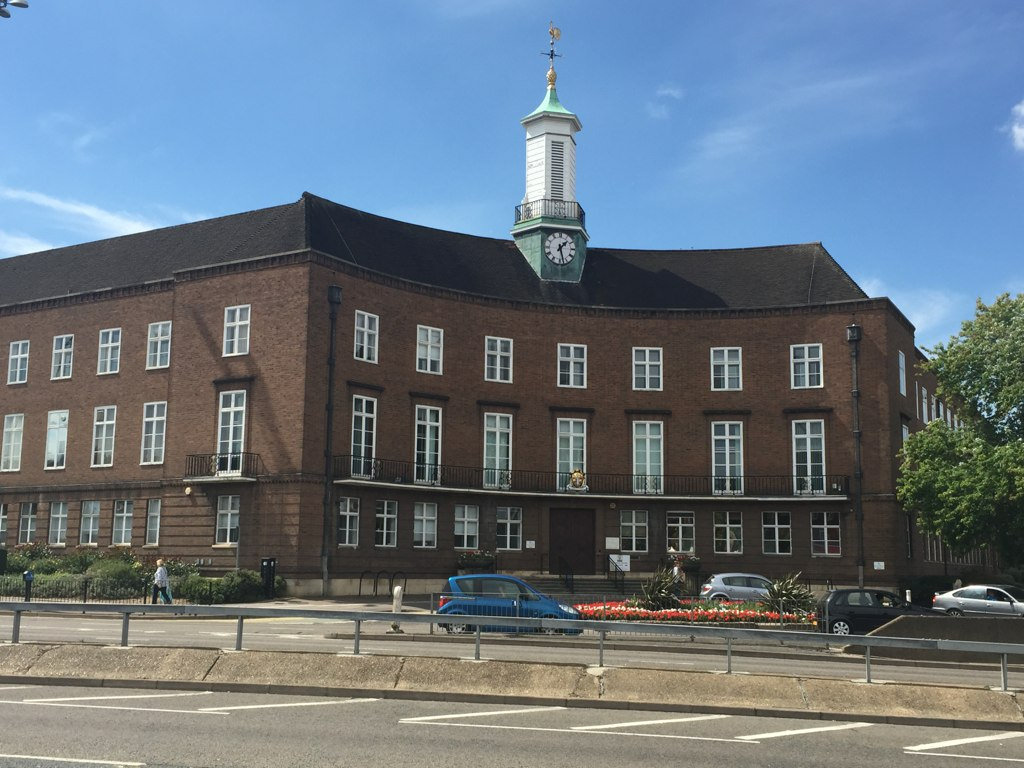
- Watford Town Hall

- Shown in Hertfordshire
- 51.6594°N 0.4031°W
- Location: Hempstead Road, Watford WD17 3EX

History
- Built: 1939

Site notes
- Architect: Charles Cowles-Voysey
- Architectural style: Neo-Georgian style
- Restored: 2023-30
- Owner: Watford Borough Council
- Website: www.watford.gov.uk

Listed Building – Grade II
- Designated: 21 December 1994
- Reference no.: 1251002

Watford Town Hall is a municipal building on the junction of Rickmansworth Road and Hempstead Road in Watford, England. It is the headquarters of Watford Borough Council.

The Neo-Georgian building was designed by the English architect Charles Cowles-Voysey as part of a civic complex, along with the adjoining Watford Colosseum, and opened in 1939. Today it is a Grade II listed building. It is currently undergoing refurbishment, and from 2026/2027 it will house the Museum of Watford.

== History ==
In the early 20th century Watford Urban District Council operated from municipal offices at Upton House in The Parade. The council sought a proper town hall after it achieved municipal borough status in 1922. The site proposed for the new building in Rickmansworth Road had previously been occupied by an old mansion known as "The Elms". A new purpose-built town hall was designed by Charles Cowles-Voysey, assisted by John Brandon-Jones and Robert Ashton, in the Neo-Georgian style.

The foundation stone for the new building was laid by Rigby Taylor, the Mayor, in 1938, and it was completed in 1939 It was officially opened by the Countess of Clarendon on 5 January 1940. The design involved a concave main frontage of seven bays facing Rickmansworth Road from which wings stretched back to the south west and north west; the central section featured a doorway with a wide cast iron balcony and a shield above; there was a clock with a lantern above at roof level.

The facility also included a large public venue at the south west end of the complex initially known as "Watford Town Hall Assembly Rooms" but now referred to as the Watford Colosseum.

The town hall design was influential at the time; in 1937, Voysey was appointed to oversee a design competition for the new Friern Barnet Town Hall in North London. The winning design, by Sir John Brown, A E Henson and Partners, was a curved neo-Georgian building topped with a clock in a very similar style to Watford Town Hall.

During the Second World War, William Joyce, who as Lord Haw-Haw broadcast Nazi propaganda from Germany to the UK, questioned Watford Borough Council why the clock was two minutes slow . Meanwhile British military forces carried out defensive exercises in case German invading forces ever stormed the town hall.

In 1971 the Watford Peace Memorial, which had originally been constructed outside the Peace Memorial Hospital, was moved to a location on the Parade just outside the building.

The town hall remains the headquarters of Watford Borough Council.

=== Redevelopment ===
In August 2019, Watford Borough Council initiated a public consultation on a rejuvenation plan which could see the area around the town hall being turned into a "cultural hub" and the town hall itself being converted into a hotel. The council indicated that, while the rest of the building might be redeveloped, the council chamber and committee rooms would be kept in their current use.

The Watford Town Hall Quarter scheme is now under way, and involves improvements to the Town Hall and the neighbouring Watford Colosseum and Watford Library, with improved pedestrian and cycling access to Watford High Street and West Herts College. The Museum of Watford is in currently being relocated to the Town Hall building, and the collection is to be organised into three new galleries. The Town Hall Quarter scheme is expected to be completed by 2026/27.

== Architecture ==
Cowles-Voysey was the master planner of Watford Town Hall, while John Brandon-Jones was responsible for detailed design work. Historic England records that Watford Town Hall is an "unusually rich and complete surviving town hall of the later 1930s", and considers that its inventive use of neoclassical architecture conveys civic dignity well.

The brick building is noted for its curved concave façade which originally reflected the shape of a large roundabout at the junction of Hempstead and Rickmansworth Roads, prior to the construction of an underpass. The front elevation is topped with a lantern clock tower.

The town hall is noted for its original 1930s interior, with a stone-panelled entrance hall, Imperial staircase and bronze balustrade decorated with stylised female figures. On the first floor, a curved corridor reflects the form of the façade, leading to committee rooms, principal offices and the mayoral suite. The rooms are panelled with wood veneer, and the original light fittings and clocks survive intact. At the rear is the double-height council chamber, which is noted for its original acoustic panels, hardwood panelling, light fittings, and panelled doors. A tapestry panel designed by Anne Brandon-Jones bearing the borough arms is behind the mayoral bench.
