= Worthing Town Hall =

Municipal building in Worthing, West Sussex, England

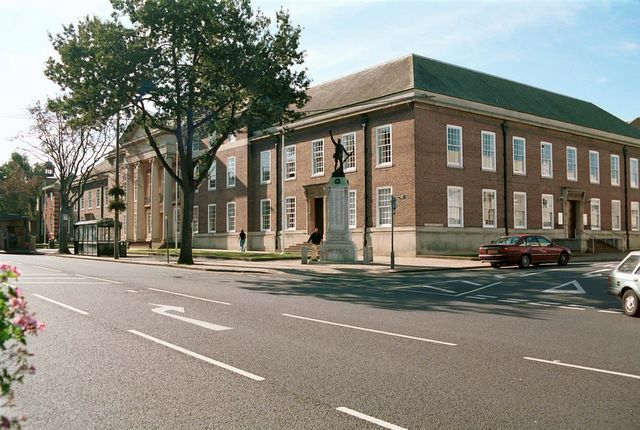
- Worthing Town Hall

- Shown in West Sussex
- 50.8148°N 0.3719°W
- Location: Chapel Road, Worthing

History
- Built: 1931—1933

Site notes
- Architect: Charles Cowles-Voysey
- Architectural style: Neo-Georgian style

Listed Building – Grade II
- Official name: Worthing Town Hall including Assembly Hall and Worthing Room
- Designated: 19 January 1982
- Reference no.: 1250786

Worthing Town Hall, or New Town Hall, is a municipal building in Chapel Road, Worthing, West Sussex, England. The town hall, which is a meeting place of Worthing Borough Council, is a Grade II listed building. Located at Chapel Road in the centre of Worthing, it was opened in 1933 and built in a neo-Georgian style to designs by Charles Cowles-Voysey. Containing offices and a Council chamber it replaced Worthing's Old Town Hall as the administrative centre, a building that had been the home of Worthing's local authority from 1835 and was demolished in 1966. To the rear and west lies the Assembly Hall, built in 1935, also to designs by Cowles-Voysey. To the south lies the Worthing Museum and Art Gallery, originally built as a Carnegie Library.

== History ==
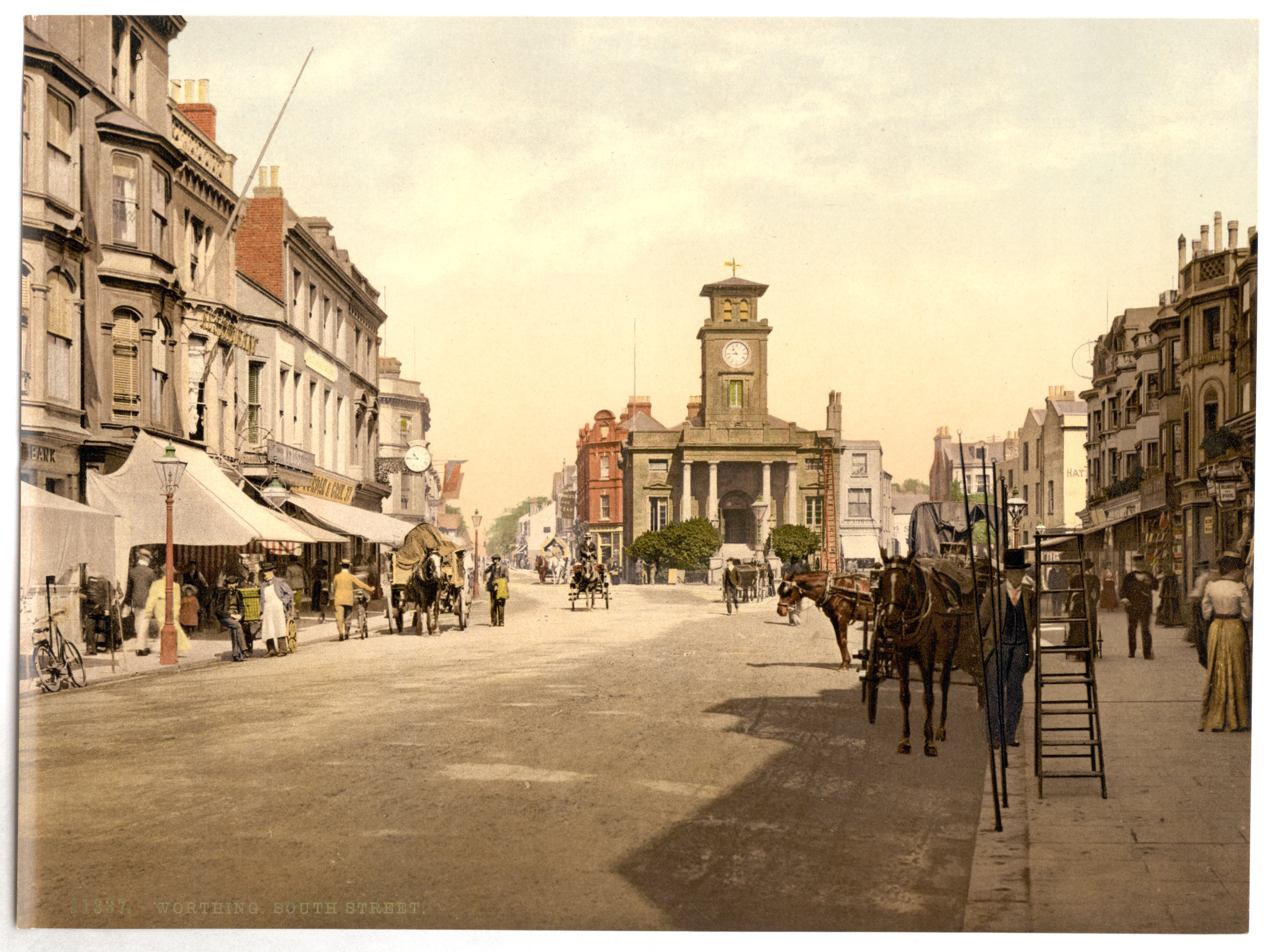
The old town hall in South Street

The town commissioners in Worthing originally met at the Nelson Inn on South Street and later at the Royal Oak Public House in Market Street. In the 1820s the commissioners decided to procure a dedicated town hall: the site they selected at the north end of South Street was a garden owned by Sir Timothy Shelley, former Whig MP for Horsham and New Shoreham and the father of the Romantic poet Percy Bysshe Shelley. The first purpose-built town hall, which was designed in the neoclassical style with a tetrastyle portico and a clock tower was completed in June 1835. The town hall also acted as a courthouse for hearing quarter sessions and assizes.

In the 1920s civic leaders decided that the first purpose-built town hall was inadequate (Note: The clock tower was found to be unsafe and was removed in the 1950s and the building as a whole was demolished in 1966.) and decided to procure a new building: the site they selected this time had been occupied by two large residential properties. The war memorial at the site, which takes the form of a bronze statue of a soldier holding a rifle mounted on a stone plinth, pre-dates the town hall: it was sculpted by Joseph Whitehead and Sons and unveiled by Field-Marshal Sir William Robertson on 11 April 1921.

Construction of the second purpose-built town hall commenced on 1 October 1931. It was designed by Charles Cowles-Voysey in the Neo-Georgian style, built in red brick with ashlar stone dressings at a cost of £398,117 and was officially opened by Prince George on 22 May 1933. The design involved a symmetrical main frontage with nineteen bays facing onto Chapel Road; the central section of nine bays, which slightly projected forward, featured a three-bay tetrastyle portico with Ionic order columns supporting an entablature inscribed with the words "Ex terra copiam e mari salutum" (English: "From the land fulness and from the sea health") and a large pediment. There was a clock tower and a cupola with Tuscan order columns, which was capped with a finial, at roof level. Internally, the principal rooms were the council chamber and the mayor's parlour: a map of Worthing, painted with oil paints on a wooden panel, was commissioned from the cartographer, MacDonald Gill, and installed in the mayor's parlour.

A large assembly hall, with a proscenium arch was built as a separate structure to the rear of the main building and also completed in 1933. The foyer of the assembly hall was decorated with two panels, one on the left and the other on the right, each designed by the sculptor, Laurence Bradshaw, and depicting a male figure standing astride two fishes.

In October 1934, the town hall was the starting point for the Battle of South Street, a riot which took place in the town as members of the British Union of Fascists and various anti-fascist protesters clashed after a newly elected fascist councillor, Charles Budd, failed to secure the committee places he desired on the council.

The town hall continued to serve as the headquarters of the local municipal borough council for much of the 20th century and remained the local seat of government after the formation of the enlarged Worthing Borough Council in 1974. Princess Alexandra and the Duchess of Gloucester visited the town hall on 20 June 2000 and 20 June 2006 respectively to take part in lunches for disabled war veterans on excursions from London. In November 2015, the council agreed that the town hall should be registered as a venue for marriages and civil partnerships.

== Design ==
=== Exterior ===
Built in a Scandinavian-influenced Classical style, Worthing Town Hall was designed by Charles Cowles-Voysey, with detailing by John Brandon-Jones. The building consists of a centre and two wings. The centre has three storeys of red brick. It has a central Ionic portico bearing the motto 'Ex terra copium e mari salutem'. Behind the portico the first floor windows have cast iron balconettes. It has a clock tower with a cupola surmounted by a ball and finial and eight Tuscan columns with plumed capitals. The north and south wings have two storeys, also of red brick.

=== Interior ===
The carpet in the council chamber is by Maufe of Heal's. The entrance hall floor is by Gilbert Bayes. In the mayor's parlour is a map of Worthing by MacDonald Gill. It depicts Worthing in 1933, when there was no development in Findon Valley or West Durrington, and very little at Goring-by-Sea. Instead there were many glasshouses across the borough that grew a variety of produce including figs, tomatoes, grapes, cucumbers, mushrooms and chrysanthemums.

== Appearances in film and television ==
- Cuffs (television series)
- Vindication Swim

== See also ==
- Listed buildings in Worthing
- Cambridge Guildhall, influenced by Cowles-Voysey's design for Worthing Town Hall

== Bibliography ==
- Hare, Chris (1991). Historic Worthing: The Untold Story. Cassell Reference. ISBN 9780900075919.
- Williamson, Elizabeth; Hudson, Tim; Musson, Jeremy; Nairn, Ian; Pevsner, Nikolaus (2019). Sussex: West. Yale University Press. ISBN 9780300225211.
