= Watford Colosseum =

Entertainment venue in Watford, England

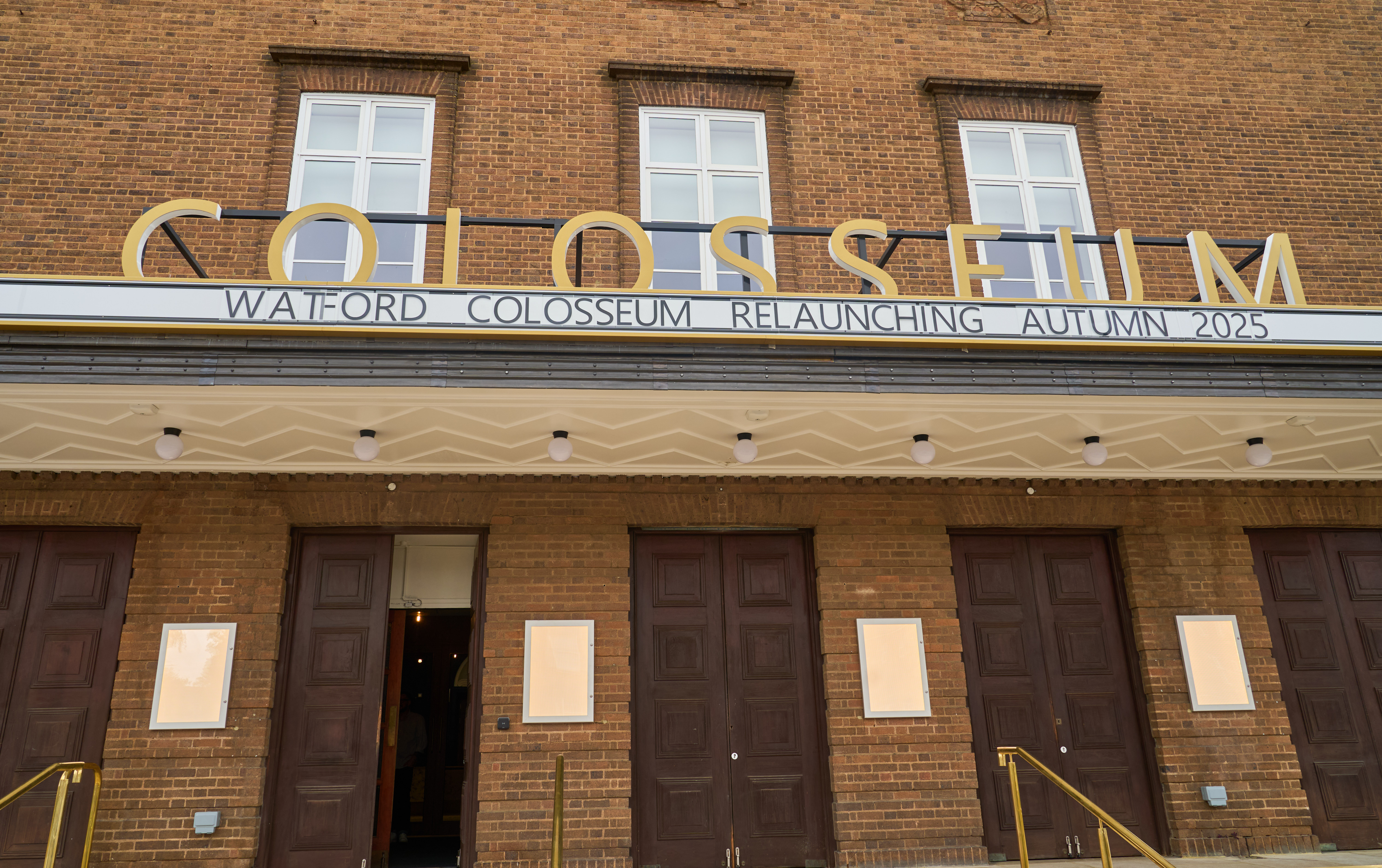
- The Colosseum in 2025
- Interactive map of Watford Colosseum
- Address: Rickmansworth Road
- Location: Watford, England
- Coordinates: 51.6591°N 0.4035°W
- Capacity: 2,000
- Type: Theatre
- Public transit: Watford Junction railway station

Construction
- Built: 1938
- Opened: 1938
- Renovated: 2010/11
- Architect: Charles Cowles-Voysey

Website
- watfordcolosseum.co.uk

Watford Colosseum is an entertainment venue in Watford, Hertfordshire, England. Established in 1938, as the Assembly Rooms for Watford Town Hall, the complex was extended in 2011 with the extension including new meeting spaces, a new restaurant and a new bar.

In October 2024, Watford Council announced that AEG Presents would take over the management and operation of the venue when it reopened in August 2025, following the completion of refurbishment works.

Performers at the venue have included the soprano Maria Callas in September 1954 and the tenor Luciano Pavarotti in June 1995. The Colosseum has been used to record various film soundtracks and is regularly used to host concerts by the BBC Concert Orchestra, including Friday Night is Music Night. It has also housed performances by performers including The Who, Robbie Williams, and Oasis.

The Colosseum is also an important venue for boxing matches with heavyweight boxer Tyson Fury building on his reputation, shortly after turning professional, in 2009. The venue also has seen some important and highly popular plays taking place and it regularly holds events in support of charities. The 2020 Snooker Shoot Out professional snooker tournament was held at the Colosseum between 20 and 23 February 2020.

== History ==
Watford Colosseum was built in 1938 as Watford Town Hall Assembly Rooms on the site of an early 18th century mansion, The Elms, which had been purchased by the council in 1919. It was designed by architect Charles Cowles-Voysey and acoustician Hope Bagenal, and cost £186,000. It acquired a worldwide reputation for its fine acoustics, and throughout the second half of the twentieth century it was used for concerts and recordings by leading orchestras and musicians.

Rising costs and falling attendance led the council to close it in 1994, reopening it in 1995 as the Colosseum in a joint management agreement with a commercial company who had previously operated at the Town and Country Club in London (now known as The Forum, Kentish Town). A steady form of income in the 1980s and early 1990s was the takings from Bus Stop 70's discos and when this revenue fell off in the late 1990s the management company got into financial difficulties: Watford Council provided a £200,000 rescue loan to the management company repayable in 2003.

After the management company collapsed in 2004, the Colosseum was managed by Watford Council until April 2010, when it closed to undergo a £5.5 million refurbishment; reopening in August 2011. Since the re-opening in 2011, the venue has been managed by Qdos Entertainment, which is owned by Nick Thomas and his wife, Sandra.

The refurbishment of 2010/11, which was carried out to a design by RHWL, which subsequently became part of Aedas, and undertaken by Kier Group, included an extension which included grey brick facades which contrasted with the original building and involved large sections of coloured glazing. The internal improvements included new meeting spaces, a new restaurant and new bar facilities. The work on the concert hall itself, on which Arup advised, was minimal in order not to disturb the fine acoustics properties of the facility. The acoustics had been analysed by an acoustics company in 2009, who reported that the size and "shoebox" shape of Watford Colosseum and the flat floor and the materials used in construction allow for pleasant reverberation and good sound quality and clarity, such as to make it among the best in Europe. The facility which extends to 949 square metres (10,210 sq ft), can accommodate 2,000 people standing or 1,392 people seated.

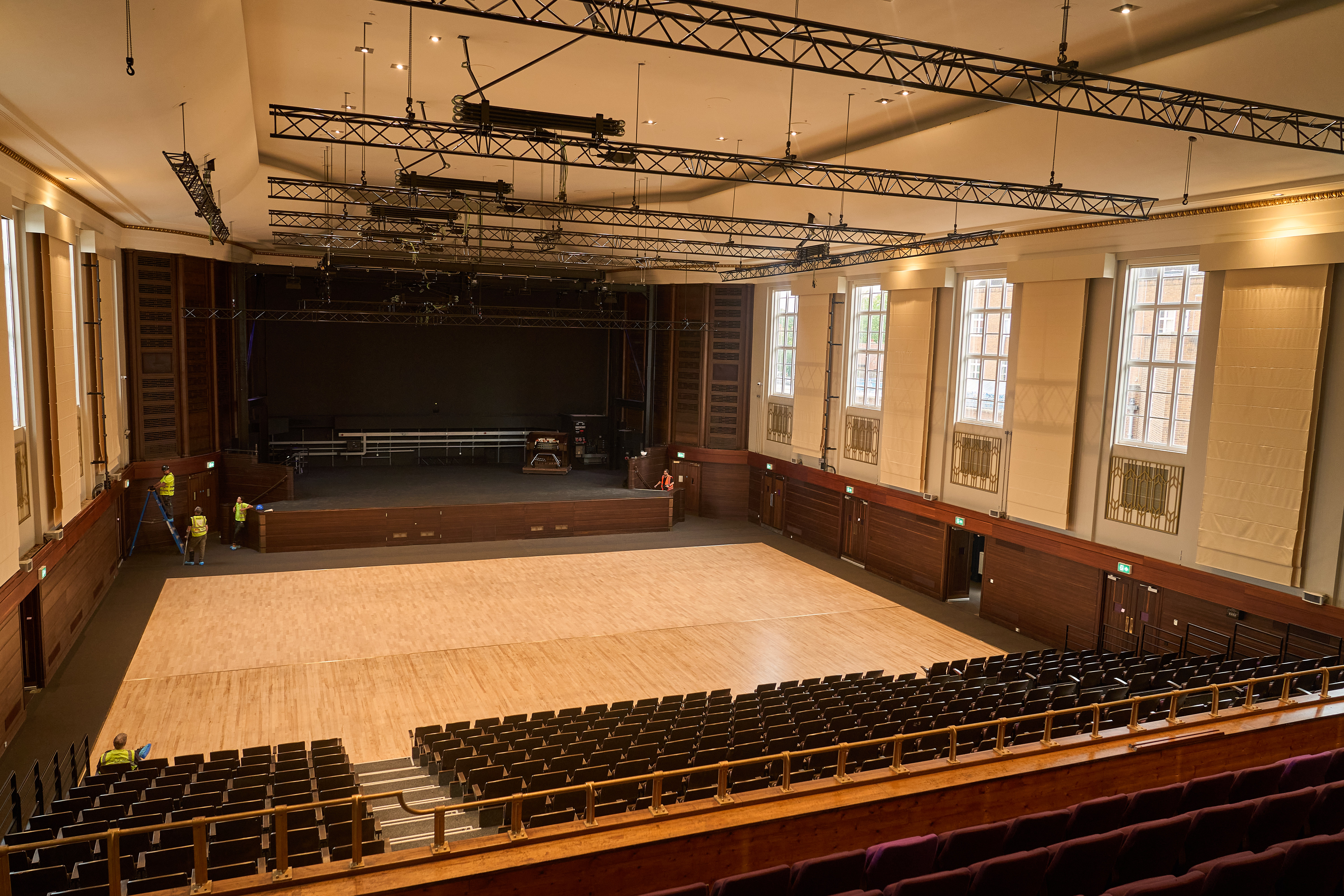
The refurbished auditorium in 2025

In 2020, the Colosseum closed as a result of the COVID-19 pandemic. At the end of that year, Watford Council ended the contract with HQ Theatres and announced a major refurbishment of the venue.

Following a successful bid for £3.2m worth of Public Sector Decarbonisation Scheme funding, works were implemented on a range of decarbonisation measures including the installation of solar panels on flat roofs, new cavity wall insulation and the refurbishment of all the windows within the venue, leading to significant gains in carbon efficiency.

In November 2023, a full refurbishment of the venue was initiated, with Morgan Sindall appointed as the principle contractor for the construction. The works included a wholesale replacement of mechanical and electric provision across the venue, refurbishments of all four bars, the relocation of stairs to the Circle Bar, a new draft lobby and a reinstatement of art deco features throughout.

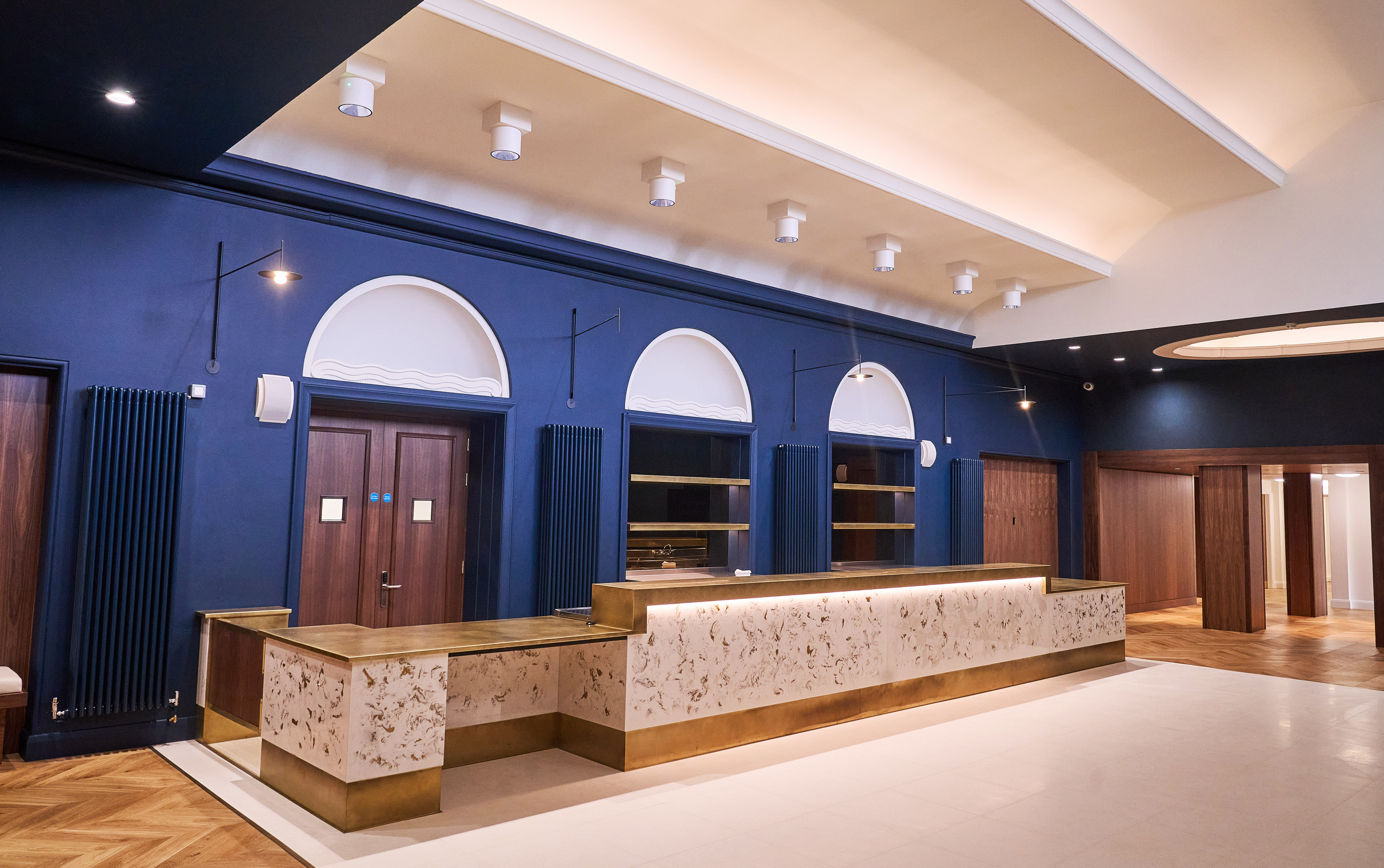
Photo of the new lobby in 2025

In October 2024, Watford Council announced that AEG Presents would take over the management and operation of the venue when it reopened in August 2025, following the completion of the works.

== Pipe organ ==
The venue boasts a pipe organ, designed and built by John Compton, which was removed from the Gaumont Palace in Chelsea when it was modernised in 1960 and instead installed at the Colosseum. The organ, which has a four-manual illuminated console, was re-commissioned in 2007, with the first of a series of concerts involving the restored instrument taking place on 12 March 2008. It was returned to its full and original standard in 2011. It has been described by The Cinema Organ Society as "one of the very best Compton organs anywhere in the country" and "one of the most versatile civic instruments in use today."

== Events and activities ==
The soprano Maria Callas recorded two albums at the venue, then known as the Assembly Rooms, in September 1954. The first album, Puccini Heroines, included excerpts from Manon Lescaut, La bohème, Madama Butterfly, Suor Angelica, Gianni Schicchi and Turandot. The second album, Lyric & Coloratura Arias, included excerpts from Rossini's The Barber of Seville, Verdi's I vespri siciliani, Meyerbeer's Dinorah, Boito's Mefistofele, Delibes's Lakmé, Catalani's La Wally, Giordano's Andrea Chénier and Cilea's Adriana Lecouvreur. The conductor for both albums, which were recorded for EMI Records, was Tullio Serafin.

In 1988 Watford was twinned with the town of Pesaro in Italy. In June 1995 the tenor, Luciano Pavarotti, who had a house in Pesaro, agreed to visit the Colosseum where, supported by the Philharmonia Orchestra, he recorded Hymn of the Nations by Giuseppe Verdi. From 1996, the Classic Concerts Trust presented regular concerts by the English Classical Players until the end of 2009. The Colosseum was used to record various film soundtracks, including The Lord of the Rings, The Sound of Music, and Sleepy Hollow; and among classical recordings, Julian Lloyd Webber's performance of Elgar's Cello Concerto, conducted by Yehudi Menuhin. It is regularly used to host concerts by the BBC Concert Orchestra, including Friday Night is Music Night, and has housed performances by performers including The Who, Robbie Williams, and Oasis.

The Colosseum is also an important venue for boxing matches with heavyweight boxer Tyson Fury building on his reputation, shortly after turning professional, by winning a fight against the Northern-Ireland boxer Scott Belshaw in a technical knockout there in May 2009. Local boxer, Dan Bowie from Holywell, won the WBC British Muaythai Boxing title at the Colosseum in November 2013.

The venue also has seen some important and highly popular plays taking place including Calendar Girls, a play about some ladies from Yorkshire raising money by posing for a charity calendar; the play starred Lesley Joseph, Sue Holderness, Ruth Madoc, Camilla Dallerup, Helen Fraser, Deena Payne, Kacey Ainsworth and Kevin Sacre and took place in 2012.

The Watford Colosseum regularly holds events in support of charities. In February 2010 the Hardcore punk band, Gallows, whose performers come from Watford and Hemel Hempstead, put on a performance at the venue which raised funds for the Peace Hospice, a local health facility caring for people with a life-limiting or terminal illness, which is funded by public donations. In October 2011 a charity concert, involving Zulu warriors, Ghanaian acrobats and Masai cultural dancers was held at the venue in order to raise funds for an appeal following the 2011 East Africa drought. The rapper, singer, songwriter and record producer, Ms. Dynamite, arranged a function in support of Great Ormond Street Hospital at the venue in April 2012, although that particular event had to be moved at the last minute because of a leaking roof.

The 2020 Snooker Shoot Out professional snooker tournament, which was the 10th edition of the tournament, was held at the Colosseum between 20 and 23 February 2020.
