= Municipal Offices, High Wycombe =

Municipal building in High Wycombe, Buckinghamshire, England

Municipal Offices
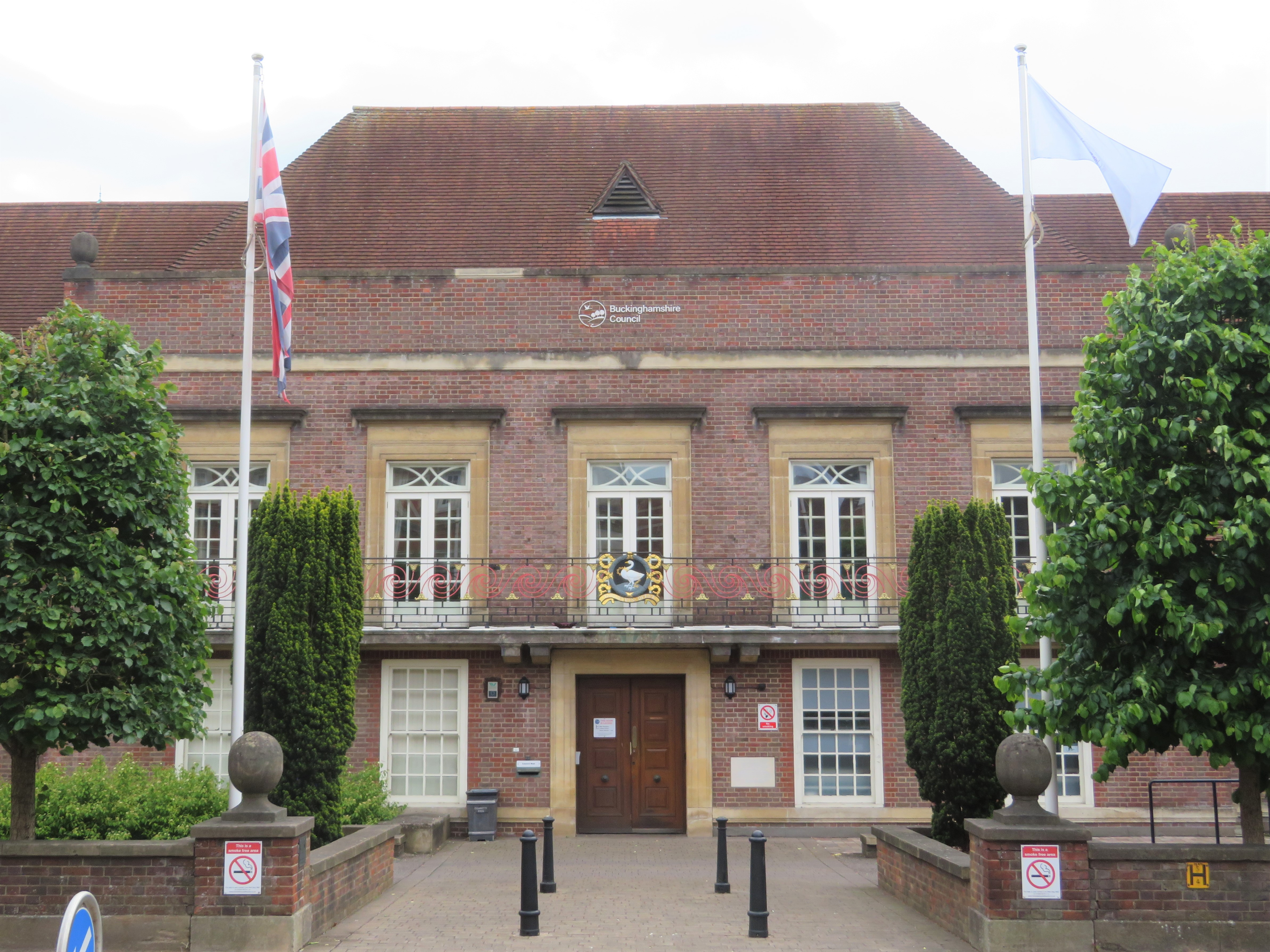
- Municipal Offices

- Location within Buckinghamshire
- 51°37′39″N 0°44′56″W
- Location: Queen Victoria Road, High Wycombe, Buckinghamshire

History
- Built: 1932

Site notes
- Architect(s): Richard Greaves Brocklehurst and Charles Cowles-Voysey
- Architectural style: neo-Georgian style

The Municipal Offices are located on Queen Victoria Road in High Wycombe, Buckinghamshire, England. The structure is used as the High Wycombe local area office of Buckinghamshire Council.

== History ==
Since the town became a municipal borough, under the name of Chepping Wycombe, on 1 January 1836, the borough council had always held its meetings in the 18th century guildhall in the High Street, whilst the council's staff were accommodated in various rented offices around the town.

When the council decided to proceed with building its own municipal offices and council chamber in the early 1930s, it chose not to use the site north of High Wycombe Town Hall which had been reserved for that purpose in the 1903 design for that building. Instead, it built a separate building on the opposite side of Queen Victoria Road, facing the town hall. The new building was designed by Richard Greaves Brocklehurst and Charles Cowles-Voysey in the neo-Georgian style. The foundation stone for the new building was laid on 16 May 1931 and it was officially opened on 21 June 1932, being given the name "Municipal Offices".

The design involved a symmetrical main frontage with eleven bays facing onto Queen Victoria Road. The central section of five bays, which slightly projected forward, featured a doorway with an architrave flanked by sash windows on either side; there was a full-length wrought iron balcony together with five French doors with architraves on the first floor. The wing sections featured doorways with architraves in the central bays and there were sash windows with keystones in the other bays on the ground floor and in the bays on the first floor. At roof level, each of the three sections had its own hipped roof with the central roof advanced from the wing sections. Internally, the principal room was the council chamber. The architects were awarded a bronze medal by the Royal Institute of British Architects for the design of the municipal offices.

High Wycombe Borough Council was abolished in 1974 under the Local Government Act 1972. The successor body, Wycombe District Council, used the municipal offices as its headquarters, substantially extending the building to the rear and renaming it the "District Council Offices". Following further local government reorganisation in 2020, the building became the High Wycombe local area office of Buckinghamshire Council.

In March 2026, the building was acquired by Buckinghamshire Healthcare NHS Trust with the intention of using it to deliver local care.
