= Museum of Watford =

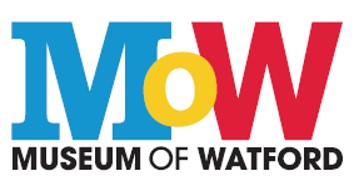

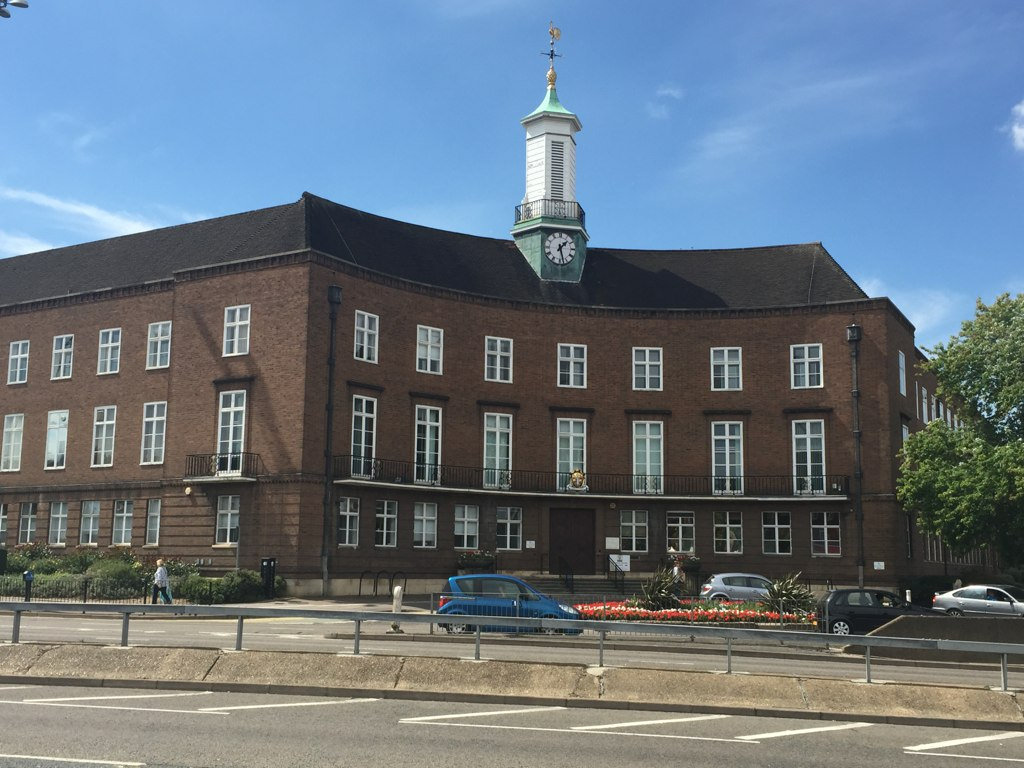
- The Museum of Watford is to be housed in Watford Town Hall

- Location of Watford in Hertfordshire
- Former name: Watford Museum
- Established: 14 March 1982
- Location: Watford Town Hall, Rickmansworth Road, Watford, Hertfordshire, United Kingdom (temporarily closed, reopens 2026/27)
- Coordinates: 51.6594°N 0.4031°W
- Type: Local museum
- Accreditation: Hertfordshire Association of Museums; Museums, Libraries and Archives Council
- Owner: Watford Borough Council
- Public transit access: Watford Junction
- Website: www.watfordmuseum.org.uk

Watford Museum is a local museum in Watford, Hertfordshire, in the United Kingdom. It is owned by Watford Borough Council. It is temporarily closed to the public while the collection is being relocated from its former home on the Lower High Street in Watford to Watford Town Hall.

The museum opened in 1981 and until 2023, was housed in a Grade II-listed Georgian town house which was previously the premises of Benskins Brewery. Its collection includes fine art, displays about local heritage, industry and sport, with a special collection related to the history of the Cassiobury Estate.

== History ==
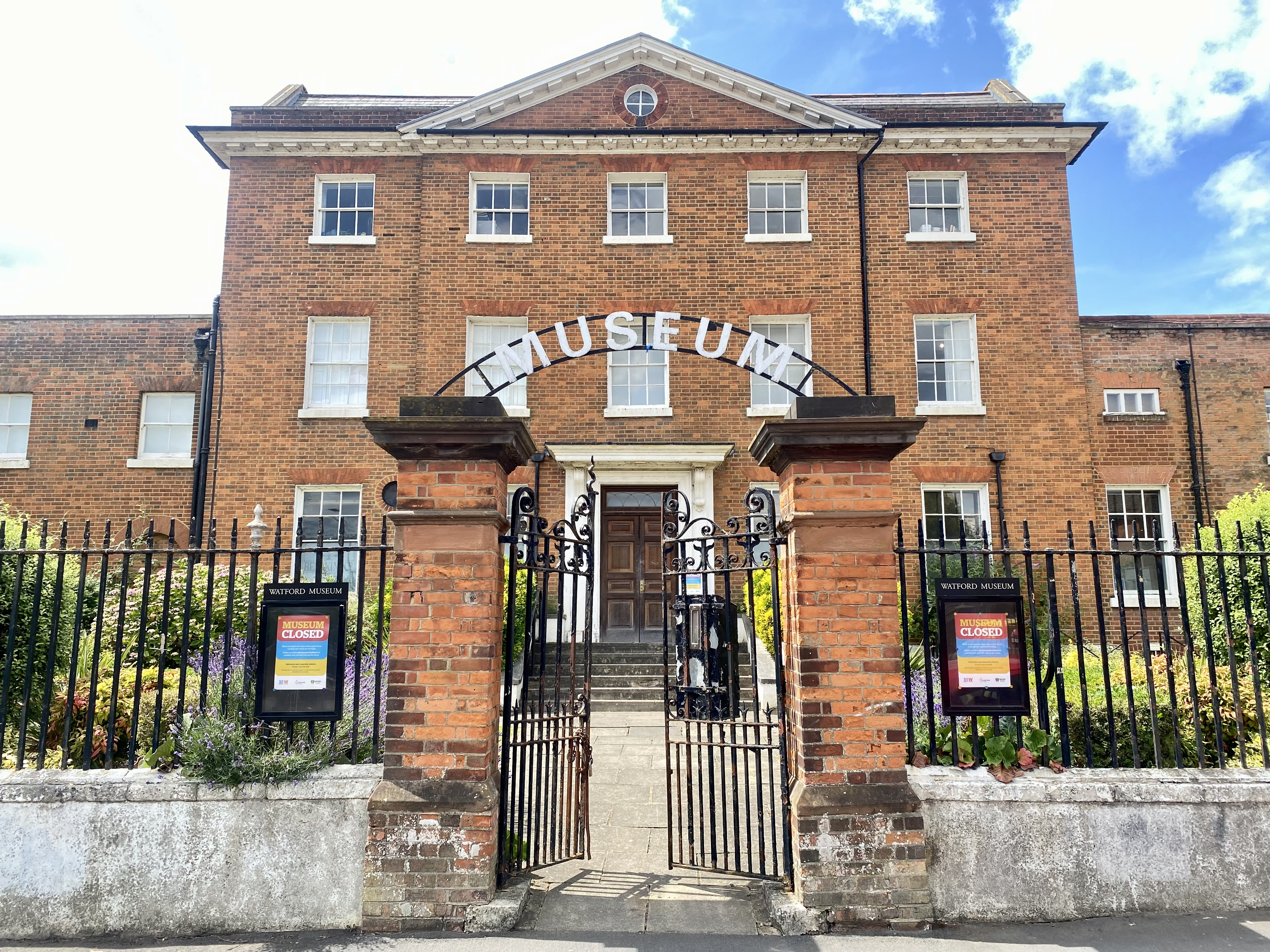
The previous home of Watford Museum in the former Benskins Brewery building

When Watford Museum opened in 1982, it was originally housed in a mansion house at 194 Watford High Street. This house was built for the Dyson family around 1775, although there are records of a brewery operating on the site since 1750. The three-storey, red-brick house, built in the Georgian neoclassical style, is fronted by a three-bay pediment with a central bull's eye window, and flanked by two lower wings which were added circa 1807. Tall, yellow-brick Victorian brewing premises once stood behind the house, although these have since been demolished.

The house was bought in 1867 by Joseph Benskin and continued to operate as a brewery until it was acquired by Ind Coope in 1957. The mansion house was later converted into offices, and it was listed grade II by English Heritage in 1952. It became the site of the Watford Museum in 1982 and was officially opened on 14 March 1982 by the Watford-born actor and comedian, Terry Scott.

Watford Museum celebrated its 30th anniversary in 2011.

In December 2021, Watford Borough Council approved plans to relocate the museum to refurbished Watford Town Hall, and the museum closed in October 2023 to facilitate the move. Prior to reopening, the new museum has been renamed the Museum of Watford. Under plans announced by Watford Borough Council, the collection is to be organised into three new galleries. The scheme has been funded by an award of over £2.4 million from the National Lottery Heritage Fund. It is envisaged that the redevelopment of the Town Hall site will be completed by 2026/2027, and the museum will reopen to the public.

== Collections ==
The museum has a significant fine art collection, which includes the notable Cassiobury Collection. Works on display include artworks formerly of the Earl of Essex's collection at Cassiobury House, with paintings of the Cassiobury Estate such as A view of Cassiobury Park by John Wootton, View of the South-West Front of Cassiobury House by J. M. W. Turner, Cassiobury Park Gates by Charles Vickers and an 1831 painting of the Cassiobury House Winter Dining Room by William Henry Hunt. The museum also houses portraits of a number of Earls of Essex.

Among the other works of art on display are oil paintings of the Dutch and Flemish schools, with works by Adam François van der Meulen, Klaes Molenaer, Pieter Neeffs the Elder and Adriaen van Ostade, as well as paintings by Turner, Peter Lely, Ronald Pope and Joshua Reynolds. A number of acquisitions for the fine art collection have been assisted by grants from the Art Fund, including paintings by Henry Edridge, Sir Hubert von Herkomer, William Henry Hunt and John Wootton, and a set of 21 engravings from the Illustrations of the Book of Job by William Blake.

The museum's sculpture collection features works in works in bronze, copper and steel by Mary Bromet, Charles Browne, Charles Dyson-Smith, Jacob Epstein, Mario Negri, Ronald Pope and Takaaki.

Displays in the museum document the development of Watford Junction railway station, and a small gallery dedicated to the history of Watford Football Club includes sports memorabilia and a stage costume worn by Elton John.

The museum holds an archive collection of documents, printed ephemera, photographs and diaries related to Watford townsfolk, local government, nobility and businesses.

Around a third of the museum's collection is on display.

Museum of Watford collection

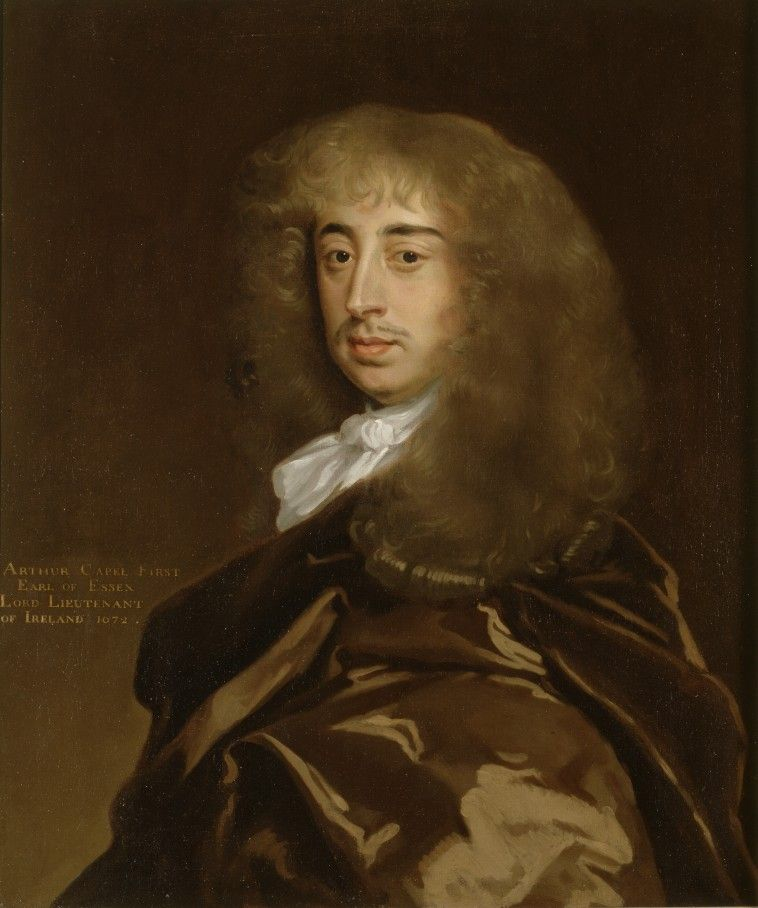
Sir Peter Lely's Portrait of Arthur Capell, 1st Earl of Essex (Cassiobury Fine Art Collection)

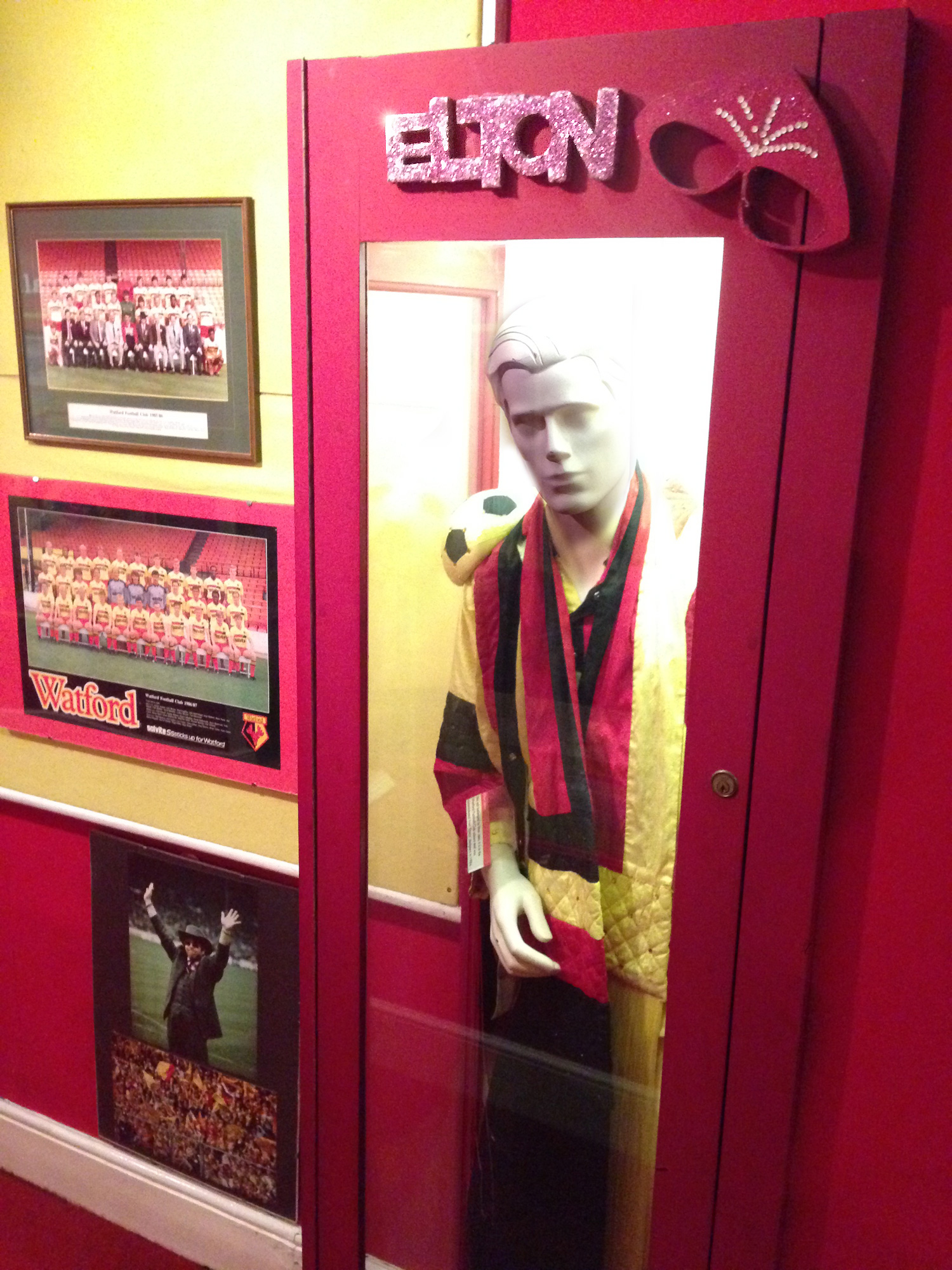
A Watford FC-inspired stage costume once worn by Elton John

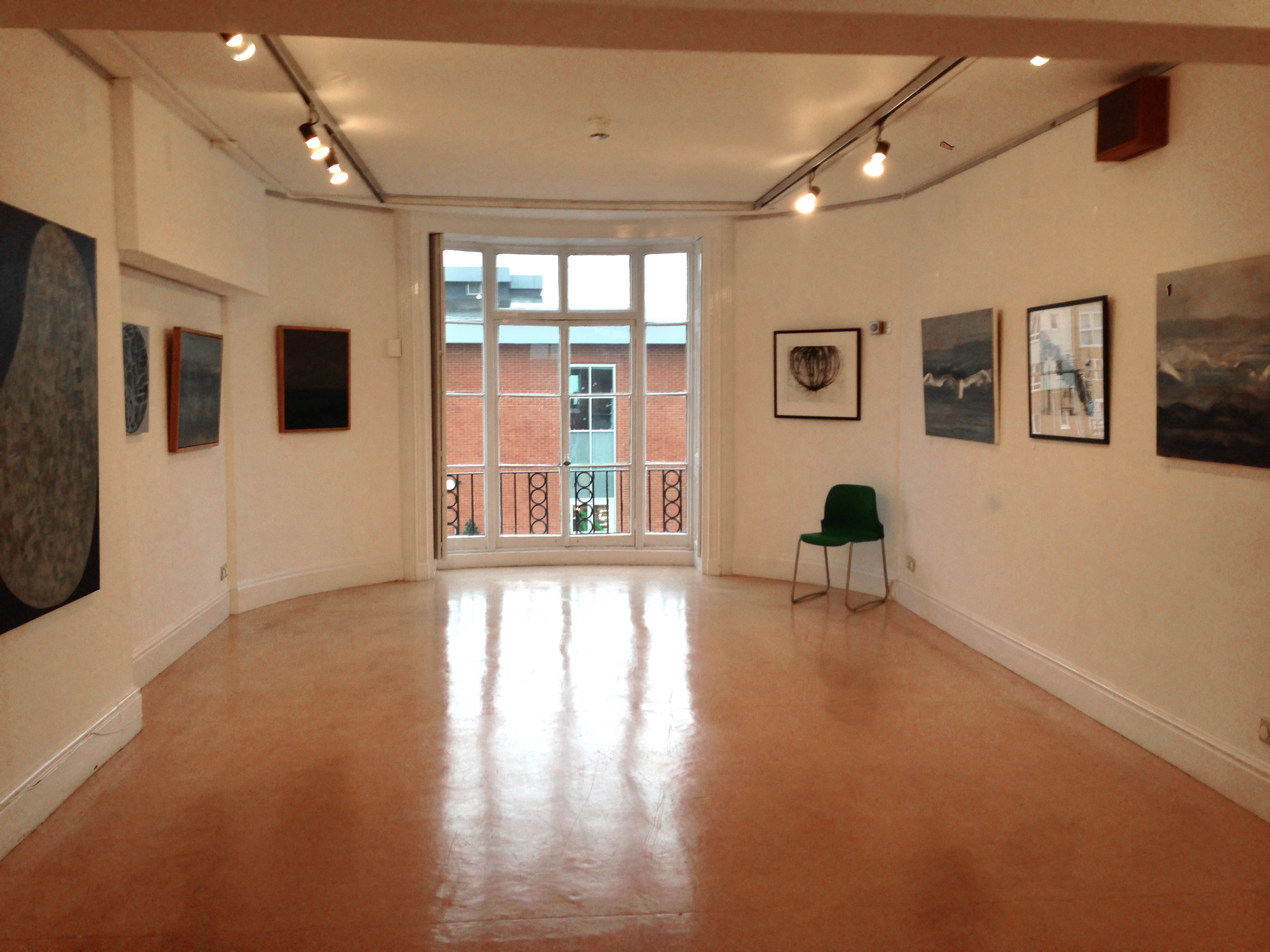
Art exhibition space at Watford Museum

== Location ==
Until 2023, Watford Museum was located on the lower part of Watford High Street, around 160 metres (0.1 mi) south of the Harlequin Shopping Centre. When it reopens, the Museum will be housed within Watford Town Hall at the northern end of the High Street.

The nearest railway station will be Watford Junction, served by London Northwestern and the London Overground Lioness line. The museum is within easy reach of the A41, the M1 motorway, and National Cycle Route 6.
