= Bognor Regis Town Hall =

Municipal building in Bognor Regis, West Sussex, England

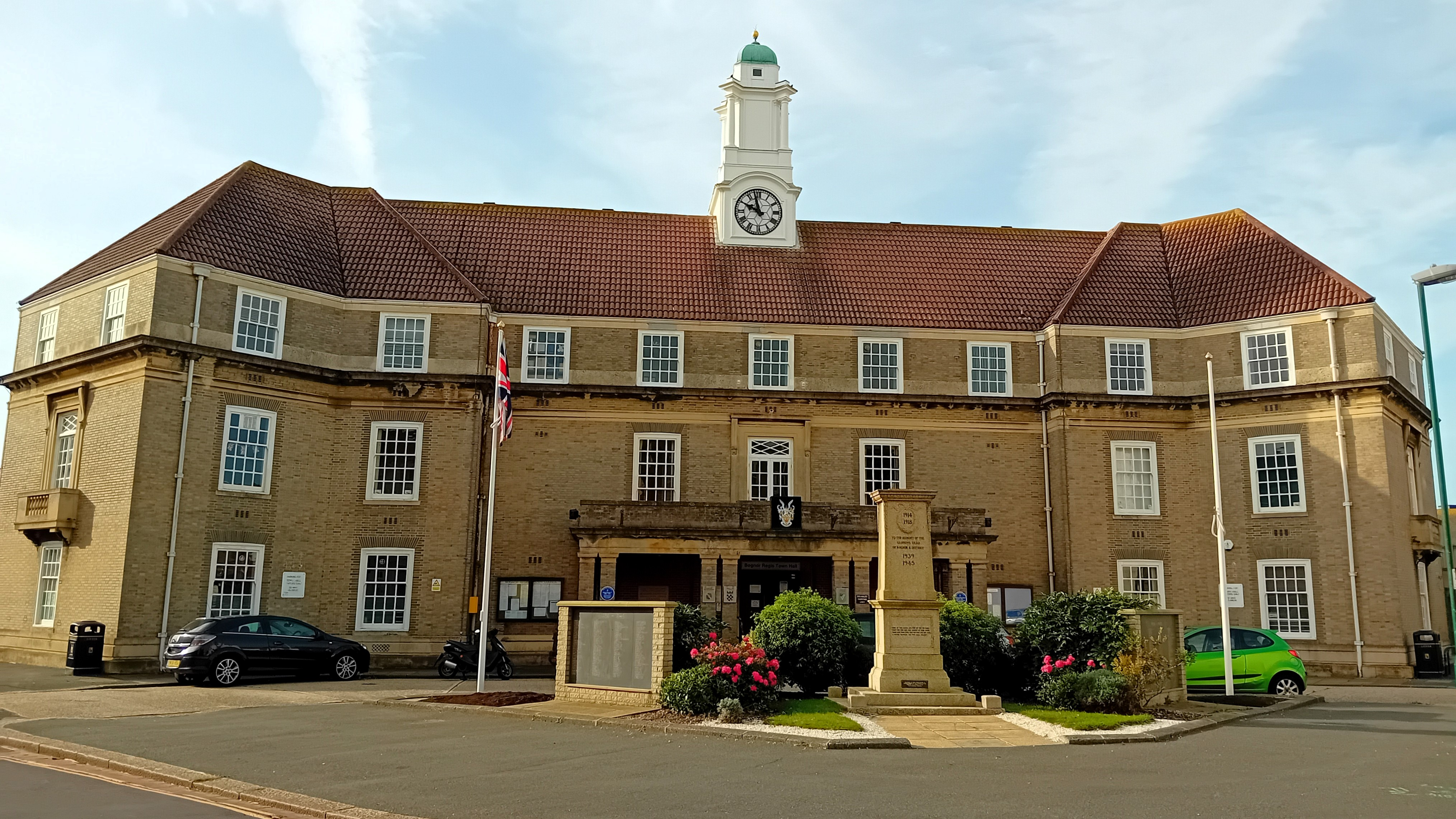
- Bognor Regis Town Hall

- Shown in West Sussex
- 50.7833°N 0.6704°W
- Location: Clarence Road, Bognor Regis

History
- Built: 1930

Site notes
- Architect: Charles Cowles-Voysey
- Architectural style: Neo-Georgian style

Listed Building – Grade II
- Official name: Bognor Regis Town Hall
- Designated: 24 January 2003
- Reference no.: 1350337

Bognor Regis Town Hall is a municipal building in Clarence Road, Bognor Regis, West Sussex, England. The town hall, which is the meeting place of Bognor Regis Town Council, is a Grade II listed building.

== History ==
Bognor was governed by improvement commissioners from 1822. The commissioners established an office in the High Street. In the late 1830s the town clerk relocated to the assembly rooms in Sudley Road and, in 1882, the Jubilee School in the High Street was converted for municipal use. Improvement commissioners' districts were reconstituted as urban districts under the Local Government Act 1894, and so Bognor's commissioners were replaced by Bognor Urban District Council. In 1929 the council decided to build a dedicated town hall: the site selected had formed part of the grounds of a convalescent home. The site selection caused some controversy as Clarence Road was seen as a "back street" by some councillors.

Foundation stones for the new building were laid by a long-serving member of the council, Councillor William Grice, and the chairman of the council, Canon Arthur Sacre, on 22 May 1929. At the same time that construction began the council also petitioned George V to be allowed to add "Regis" to the town's name; the name was formally changed to Bognor Regis on 26 July 1929.

The town hall was designed by Charles Cowles-Voysey in the Neo-Georgian style, built in yellow brick with stone dressings by a local contractor, H. W. Seymour, and officially opened by Mrs Eleanor Sacre on 11 October 1930. The design involved a main frontage of nine bays facing onto the corner of Clarence Road and Belmont Street with the end bays canted forward; the central section of five bays featured a three-bay portico with paired square piers supporting an entablature and a wide stone balcony bearing a shield; there were a French windows on the first floor and a lantern above at roof level.

A war memorial, which had been designed by William Tillott Barlow and unveiled by Major-General Sir John Frederick Daniell, late of the Royal Marine Light Infantry, in Waterloo Square on 11 November 1921, was relocated to the area in front of the town hall in time for its opening, and a Royal Warrant issued by King George V allowing the town to use the suffix "Regis" in honour of his residence in the town during his convalescence in late 1928 was installed in the council chamber.

The building was used as a surface air raid shelter during the Second World War. It remained the headquarters of Bognor Regis Urban District Council for much of the 20th century but ceased to be the local seat of government after the enlarged Arun District Council was formed in 1974. The district council continued to keep an area office in the town hall and the town council, which was formed in 1984, established the town hall as its main meeting place. A clock was added to the turret to mark the new millennium in the year 2000 and the building became recognised as an "asset of community value" in May 2018.
