= John Brandon-Jones =

British architect

John Brandon-Jones (18 September 1908 – 1 May 1999) was a British architect. His work was heavily influenced by the Arts and Crafts movement, of which he was a noted architectural historian.

== Life and career ==
Brandon-Jones was born in Hendon into a family with a strong Unitarian tradition, and was christened by the Rev Charles Voysey (with whose grandson Brandon-Jones would later enter into an architectural partnership). Brandon-Jones' father was an art teacher, while his mother studied dress at the Central School of Arts and Crafts and wrote books on embroidery.

The family moved to Harpenden and Brandon-Jones' father was engaged as an art teacher at Berkhamsted School, and where Brandon-Jones was enrolled in 1919. However, after contracting tuberculosis in 1921, he was sent to Bembridge School on the Isle of Wight, which most likely influenced his decision to become an architect. While at Bembridge he learned his skills in wood working, engraving and printing, as well as becoming passionate about building and sailing boats.

At the age of 18, he was apprenticed to the architect, Oswald Milne (former assistant to Edwin Lutyens), and in 1929 attended the Architectural Association School of Architecture. However, he found the new Le Corbusier style of Modern Architecture unappealing, preferring to honour continuity with the past in his designs. Before adopting the Arts and Craft idiom he designed a small development of Moderne houses for Charles Wicksteed who had also created Wicksteed Park on the same plot of land.

In 1933, he joined the partnership of Charles Cowles-Voysey as an assistant, later a partner. Voysey and Brandon-Jones won a competition for the design of Watford Town Hall, and later designed the town halls in Worthing and Bromley, as well as the Guildhall in Cambridge and the Hull Festival House.

In 1937 he was appointed a lecturer in architecture at Liverpool University's School of Architecture "where he reinstated measured drawing and the study of the classical orders, the latter as a way of learning construction, weathering and colour.", but with the start of World War II he joined the Navy as part of the Admiralty Works Department. Posted to Scapa Flow, Orkney and placed in charge of the engineers' drawing office, he designed a temporary cinema. While on Orkney he met (and later married in 1944), Helen, a cipher clerk from Glasgow.

It was also on Orkney that he encountered three rare houses on Hoy designed by William Lethaby, and his interest in and study of these led him to become one of the most respected authorities in arts and crafts domestic architecture. By pure chance, this interest was encouraged by the gift from his good friend, Dorothy Walker (the daughter of Emery Walker), of a bundle of original designs and sketches by Philip Webb. In 1955 Brandon-Jones purchased one of a pair of houses designed by Webb in Redington Road, Hampstead, in which house Brandon-Jones lived with his family until his death in 1999. His championship of Webb's reputation helped persuade the National Trust to take the Webb designed Standen into their collection.

When the war ended, he taught at the Architectural Association but resigned when the director objected to him telling the students about Webb and Lethaby "because you will undermine their confidence in the Modern Movement." He rejoined Cowles-Voysey's office in 1949 as a full partner, continuing to design civic offices. In 1955 Cowles-Voysey retired and Brandon-Jones and the other partners inherited the firm. By this time, he was in partnership with Robert Ashton and John Broadbent. With them he designed the Civic Offices in Brentwood, and rebuilt the bomb-damaged Morley College in South London. In 1960, the Hampshire County Offices in Winchester, considered to be his masterpiece, were completed. His last large civic commission was for the Surrey County buildings in Staines.

He was president of the Architectural Association School from 1957-8, and on the Royal Institute of British Architects board of architectural education. With his good friend, John Betjeman, he helped found the Victorian Society in 1958. He was a member of the William Morris Society, the Society of Antiquaries of London, the Society for the Protection of Ancient Buildings and the Art Workers Guild, and sat on the Architects Registration Council.

John Brandon-Jones died in London on 1 May 1999 after a brief illness. He was survived by his wife, four daughters (two of whom followed him into architecture) and a son.

National Life Stories conducted an oral history interview (C467/12) with John Brandon-Jones in 1997 for its Architects Lives' collection held by the British Library.

== Publications ==
He wrote a number of articles about the Arts and Craft movement, including at least two on Philip Webb., [6] Brandon-Jones, John 'C.F.A. Voysey an introduction' in Brandon-Jones, John and others, 'C.F.A. Voysey : architect & designer 1857-1941' exhibition publication with the Art Gallery & Museums and the Royal Pavilion, Brighton Published by Lund Humphries (1978).

== Gallery ==
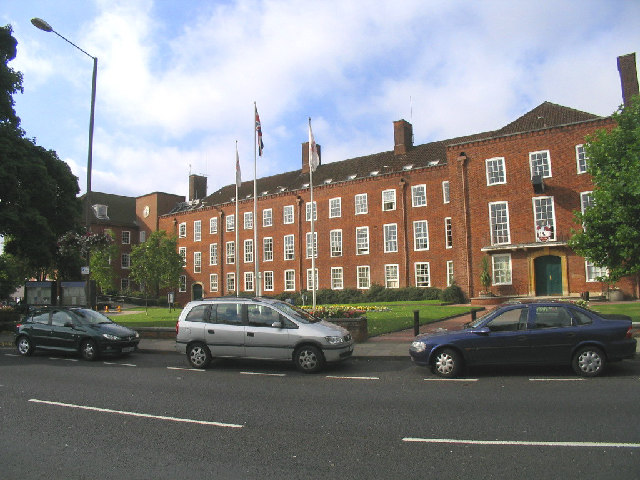
Brentwood Town hall, London (1957)

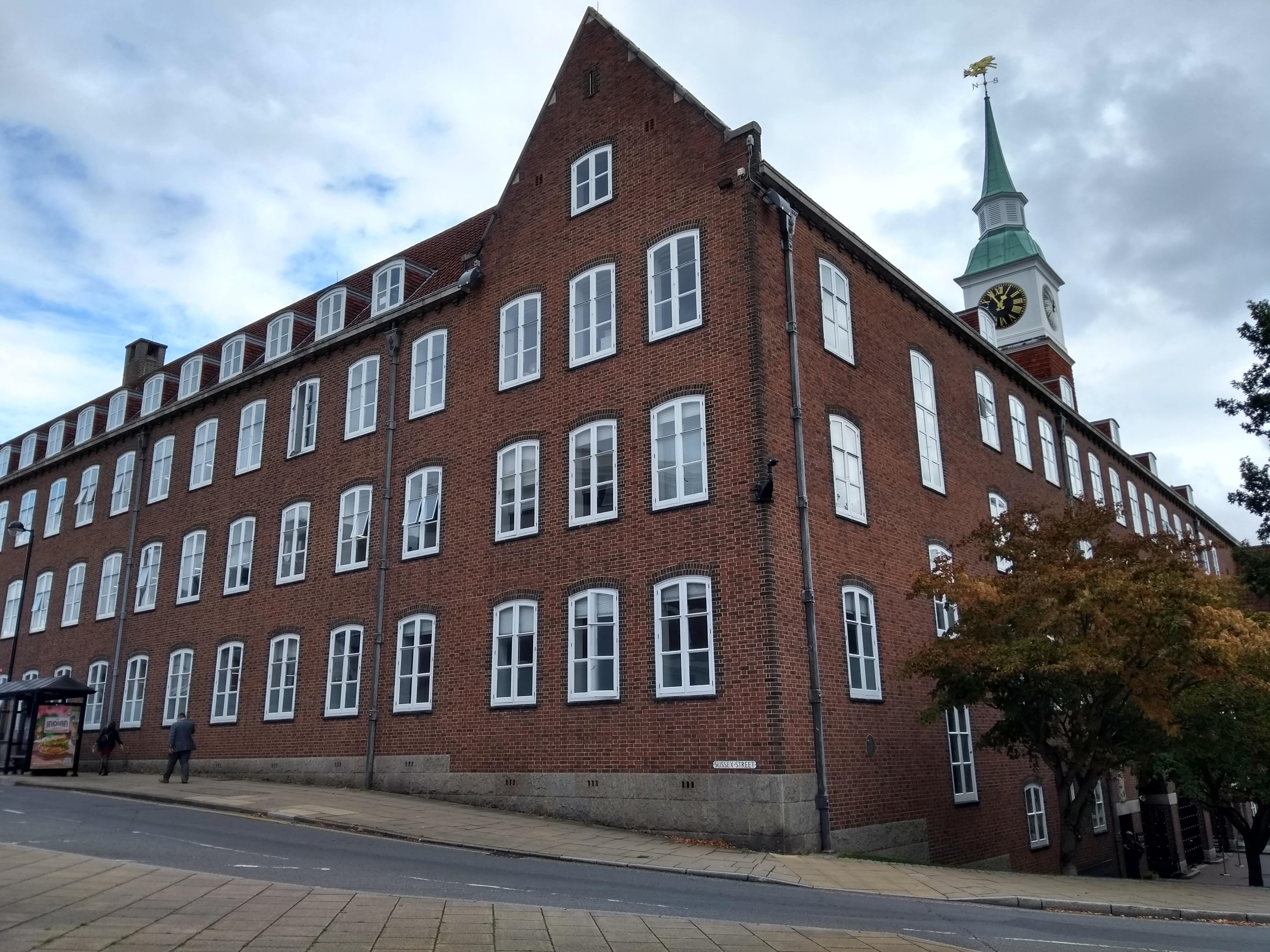
Queen Elizabeth II Court, Winchester (1959)

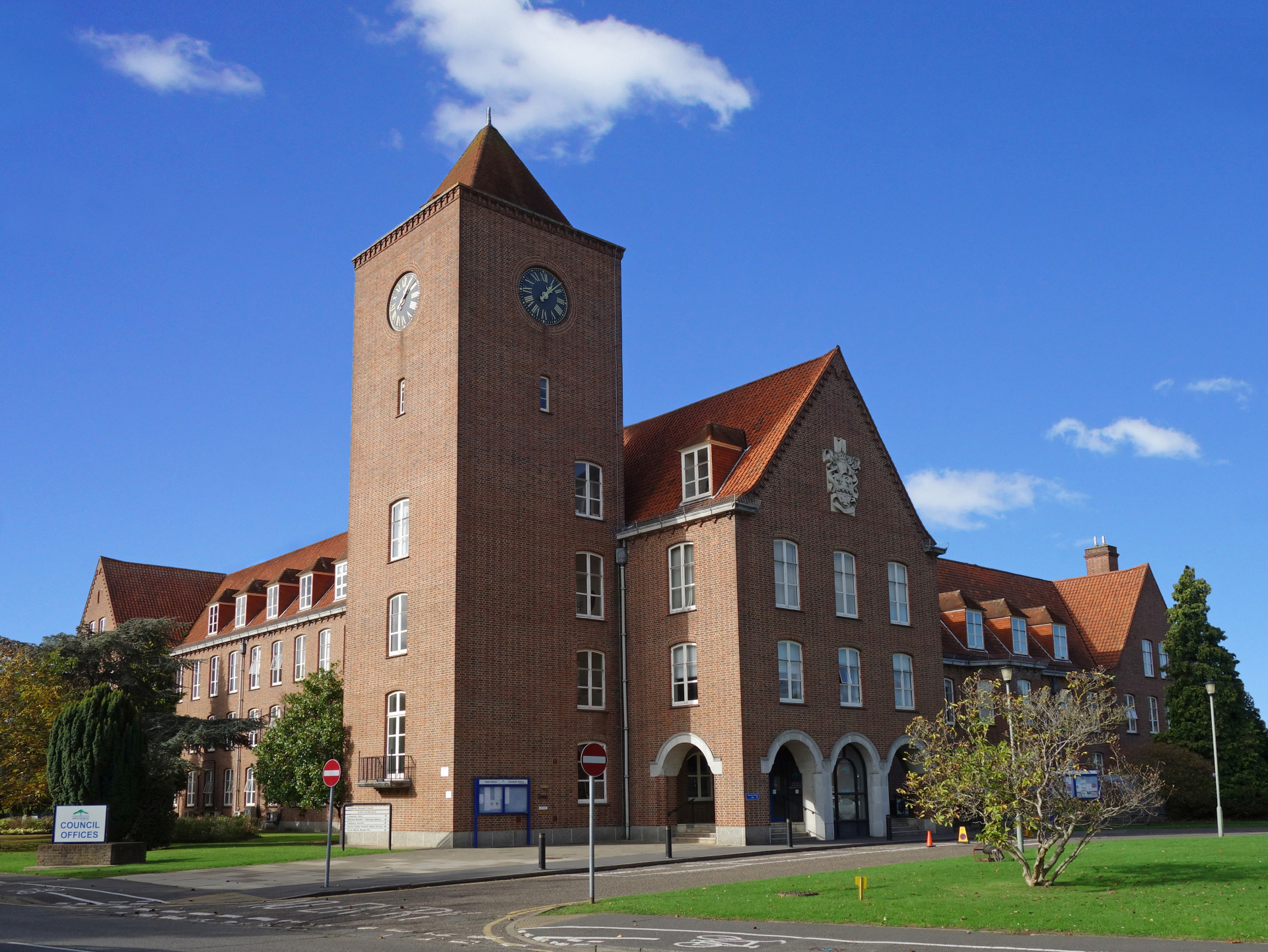
Staines Council Offices, Surrey(1967)
