= Charles Cowles-Voysey =

English architect

Charles Cowles-Voysey ARIBA FRIBA
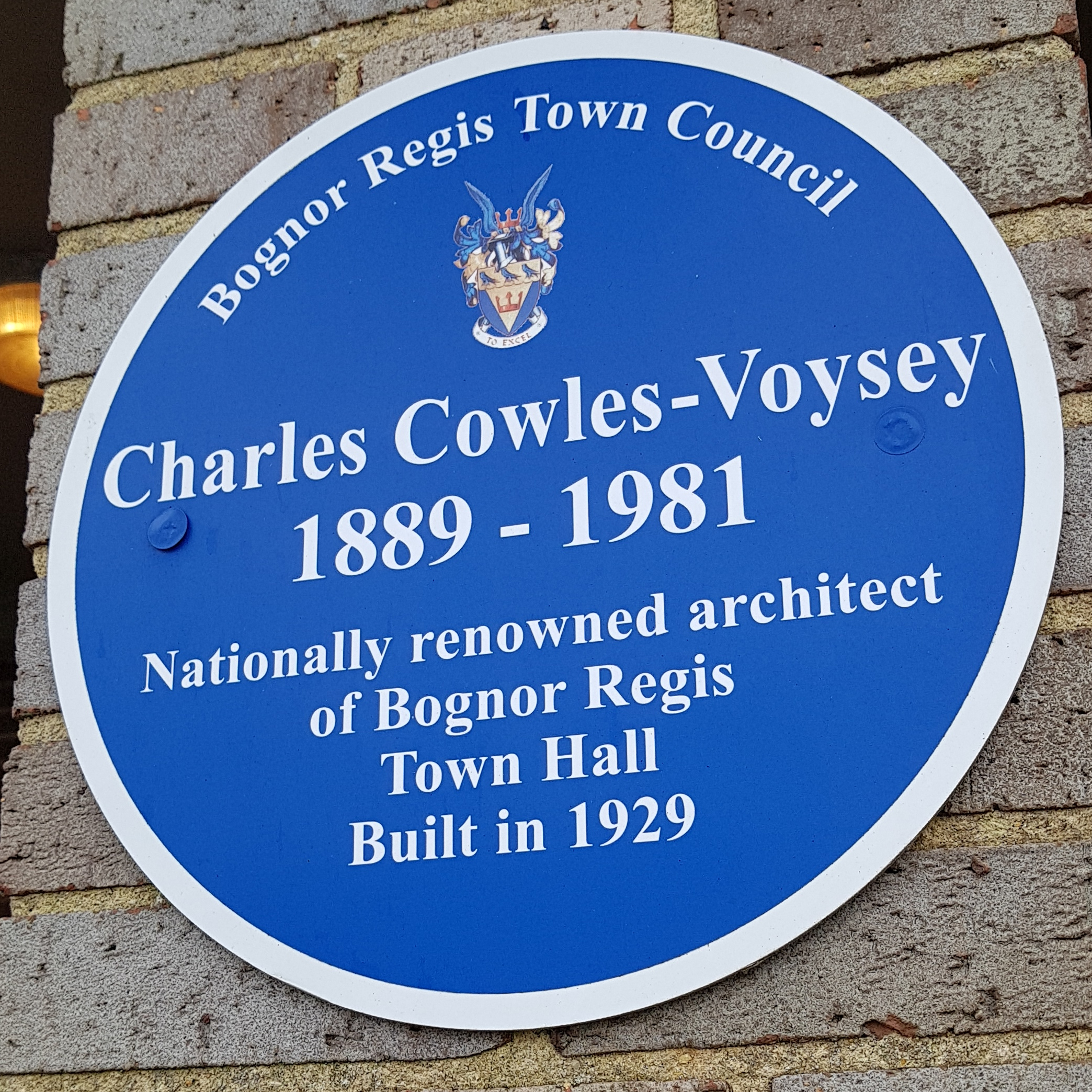
- Blue plaque on Bognor Regis Town Hall commemorating Charles Cowles-Voysey
- Born: Charles Voysey; 24 June 1889; London, England
- Died: 10 April 1981 (aged 91); London, England
- Occupation: Architect
- Family: C. F. A. Voysey (father); Charles Voysey (theist) (grandfather)
- Awards: Donaldson Medallist (1908-09), RIBA Architecture Bronze Medal (1932)
- Buildings: Bridgeton Public Halls, Glasgow (1924); Bognor Regis Town Hall (1930); Watford Town Hall (1939); Cambridge Guildhall (1939)

Charles Cowles-Voysey (24 June 1889 – 10 April 1981) was a 20th-century English architect. He was born into a dynasty of architects, his father being C. F. A. Voysey.

Voysey designed a number of municipal buildings for local authorities in the south of England, among them Bognor Regis Town Hall and Watford Town Hall.

== Early life ==
Charles Cowles-Voysey was born Charles Voysey in London on 24 June 1889, the son of the architect and designer C. F. A. Voysey.

== Education and career ==
Voysey studied architecture at the Architectural Association School in 1906 and then at University College London Bartlett School of Architecture from 1907 to 1909. Between 1909 and 1912 he was articled to Horace Field and Frederick Moore Simpson, and worked as an assistant to John James Burnet and to Horace Farquharson. In 1911, he briefly worked as an assistant to his father.

Voysey qualified as an architect in 1911 and established his own architectural practice in London in 1912. John Brandon-Jones joined the partnership as an assistant for Cowles-Voysey, later becoming a partner, and he finally took over the firm.

== Family ==
Charles Cowles-Voysey was the third in a dynasty of architects. His father, C. F. A. Voysey (1857-1941), was a renowned Arts and Crafts movement architect and designer, was recognized by the noted magazine The Studio. His great-grandfather was Annesley Voysey (1794-1839), an engineer and architect who had built lighthouses and churches, and has been credited with the design of the first purpose-built office block in London in 1823. Cowles-Voysey was a direct descendent of Samuel and Susanna Wesley of the noted Methodist family.

In 1912, Charles married Dorothea Denise Cowles (1885-1980) and amended his surname to Cowles-Voysey.

== Architectural works ==
- White Rock Pavilion (1922), Hastings
- Bridgeton Public Halls (1924), Glasgow
- Kingsley Hall (1927), London
- 1&2 Bunkers Hill, 34-42 Wildwood Road & 19 Wellgarth Road (1929), Hampstead Garden Suburb, London
- Chance Wood (1929), Sevenoaks, Kent
- Bognor Regis Town Hall (1930), Bognor Regis, West Sussex
- Municipal Offices, High Wycombe (1932), High Wycombe, Buckinghamshire
- Worthing Town Hall (1933), Worthing, West Sussex
- Watford Town Hall (1937-1939), Watford, Hertfordshire
- Cambridge Guildhall, Peas Hill Guildhall (1939), Cambridge
- Bromley Town Hall extension (1939), Bromley, Kent
- Magistrates' Court (1939), Bromley, Kent
- Maybridge Estate (1940s), Worthing, West Sussex
- Morley College reconstruction (1958), Waterloo, London
Selected Cowles-Voysey buildings

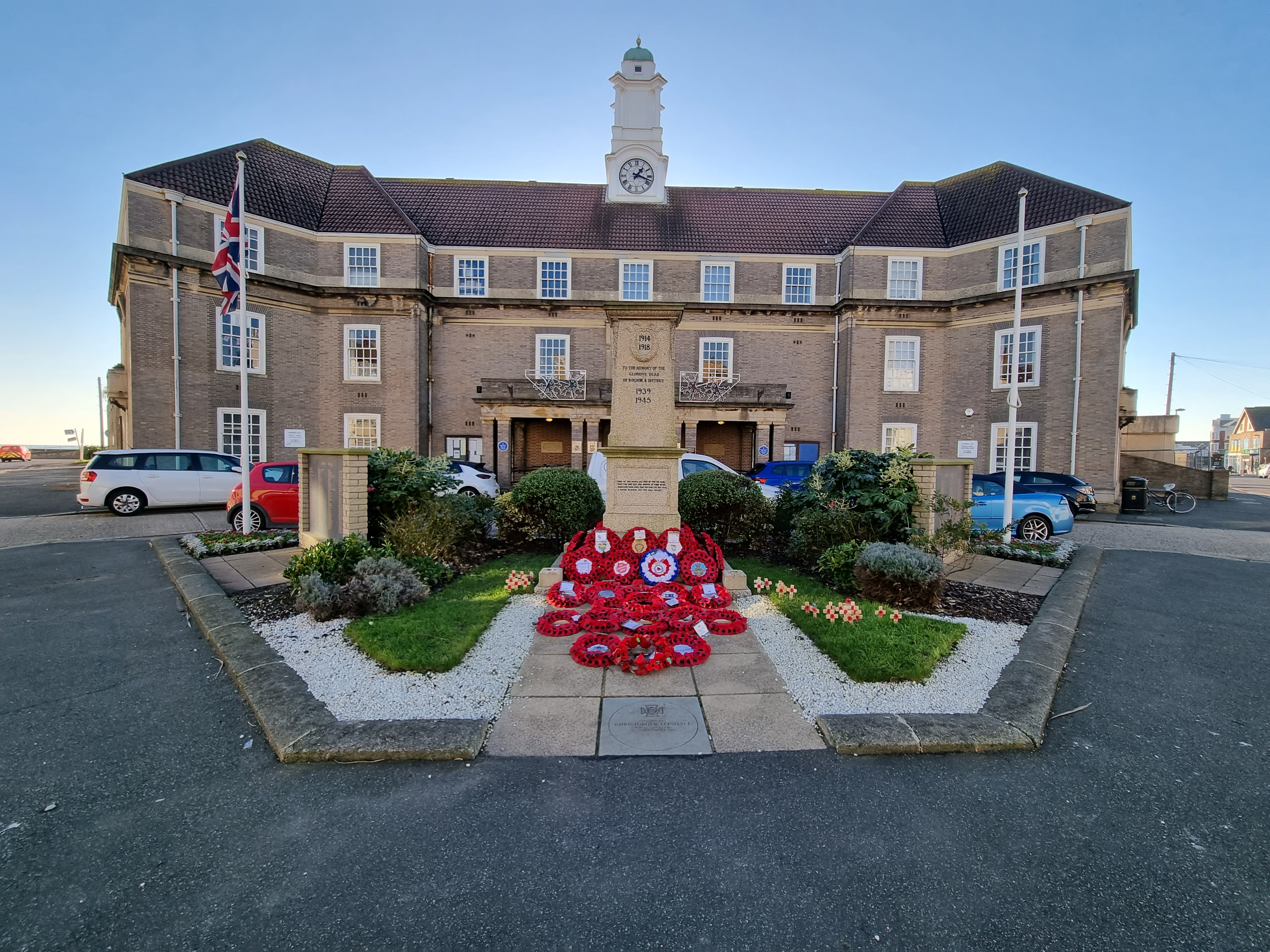
Bognor Regis Town Hall (1930)

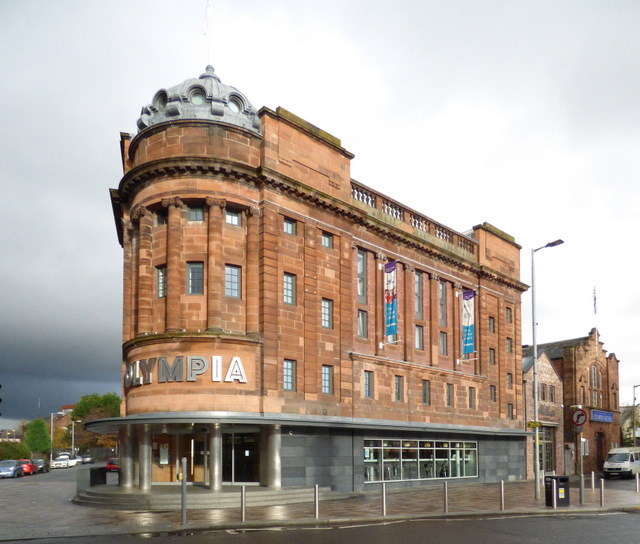
Bridgeton Public Halls, Glasgow (1924)

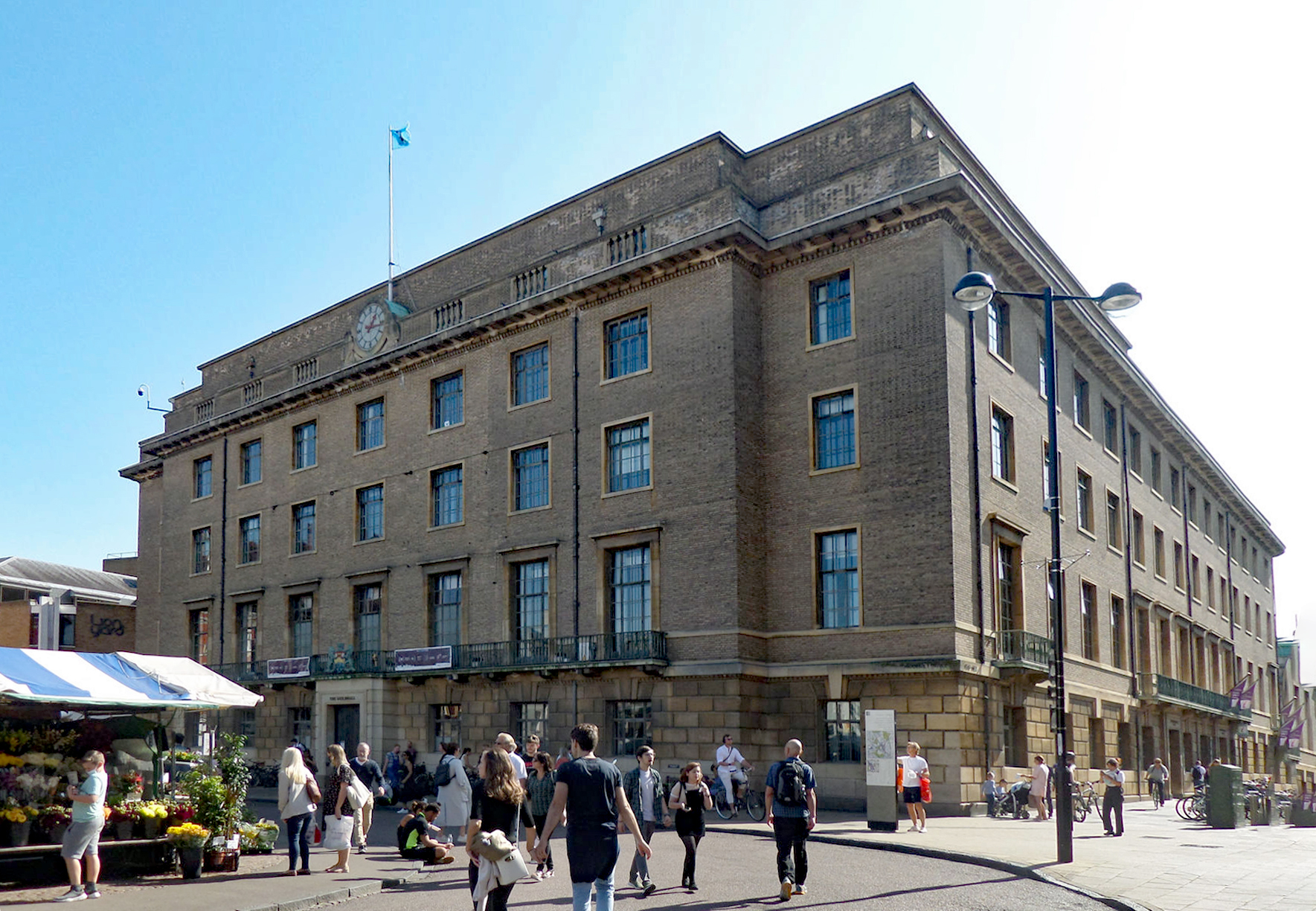
Cambridge Guildhall (1939)

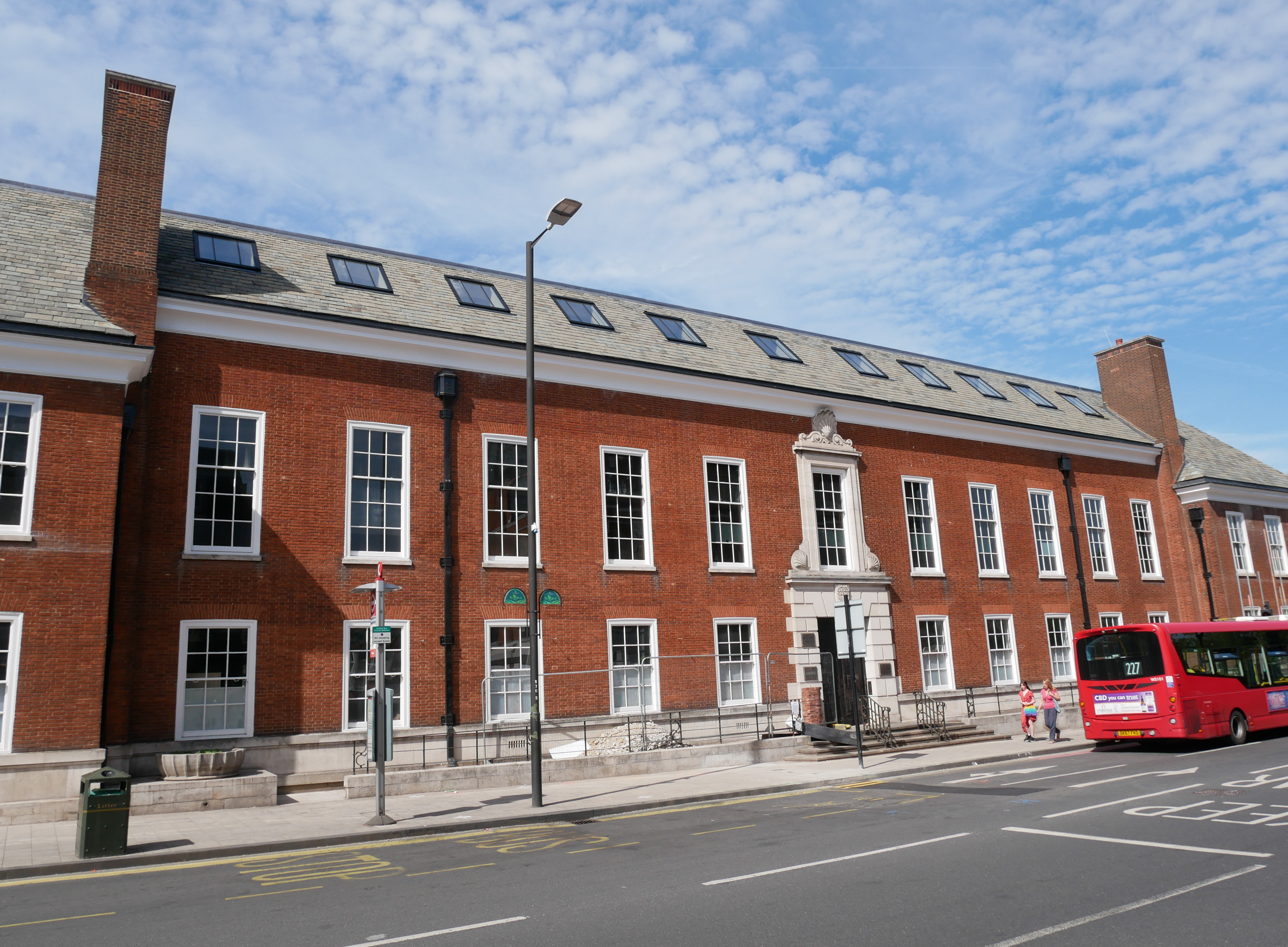
Bromley Town Hall extension (1939)

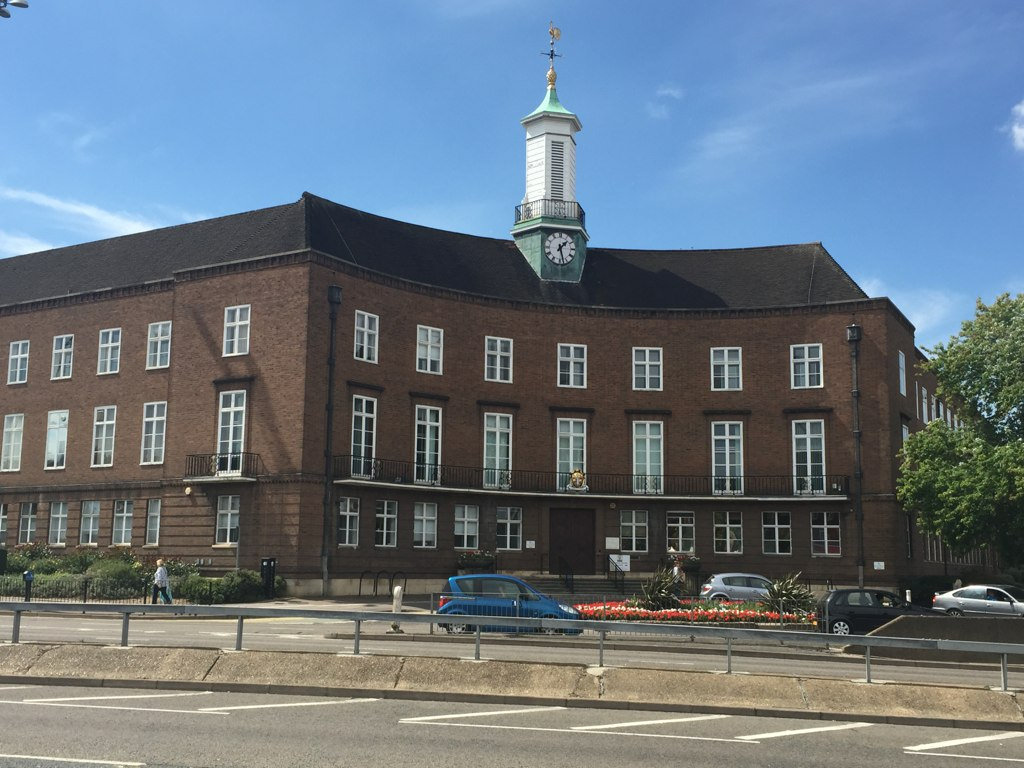
Watford Town Hall (1939)

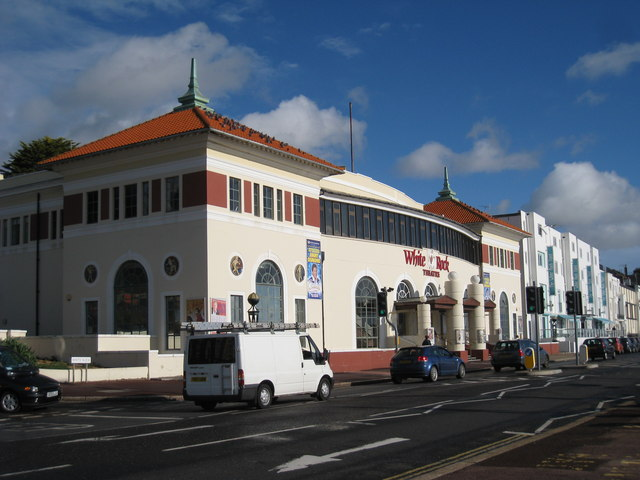
White Rock Pavilion, Hastings (1922)

== Awards ==
In 1912, Cowles-Voysey was elected an Associate of the Royal Institute of British Architects (ARIBA), and became a Fellow (FRIBA) in 1927. In 1908-09, he was a Donaldson Medallist, and in 1932, he was awarded the RIBA Architecture Bronze Medal for Berkshire, Buckinghamshire and Oxford.
