= Curved structures =

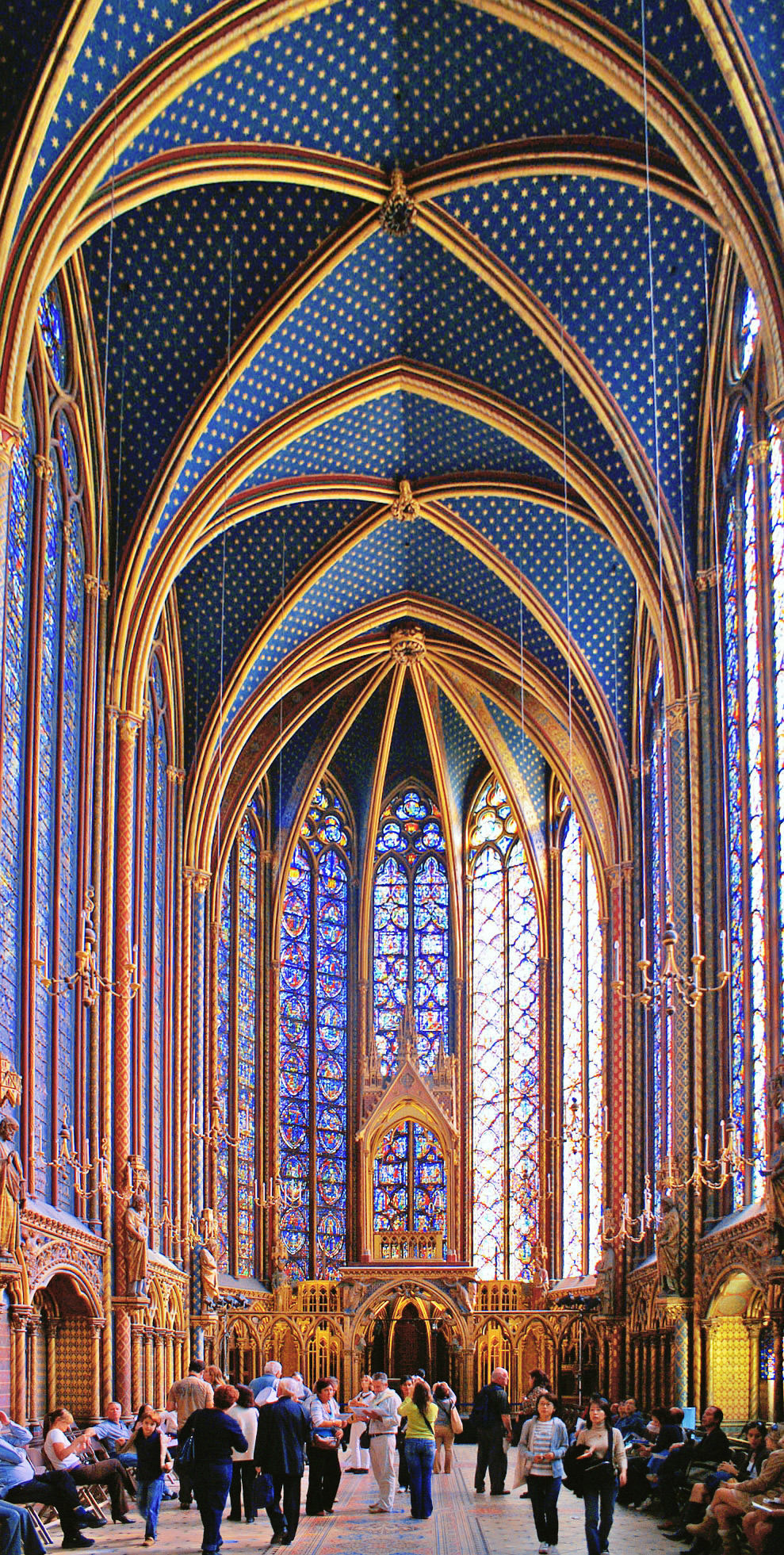
The Sainte-Chapelle in Paris. The Exapartite vault and the peculiar stained glazing closes the space and acts on the colour of the light.

Curved structures are constructions generated by one or more generatrices (which can be either curves or surfaces) through geometrical operations. They traditionally differ from the other most diffused construction technology, namely the post and lintel, which results from the addition of regular and linear architectural elements.

They have been exploited for their advantageous characteristics since the first civilisations and for different purposes. The materials, the shapes and the assemblage techniques followed the technological and cultural evolution of the societies over time. Curved structures have been preferred to cover large spaces of public buildings. In spite of their sensitivity to earthquakes, they work well from the structural static point of view.

== The geometry of curved structures ==
From the geometrical point of view, curved structures are three-dimensional solids. They are generated starting from genetratrices which undergo the geometrical operations of extrusion or revolution. The three classes of structures stated previously can be explained as follows:

- An arch is generated by the revolution of a point or a surface around a centre (or, from a mechanical standpoint it can be thought as a section of a vault);
- A Vault is generated by the extrusion of an arched surface;
- A Dome is generated by the revolution of an arched surface around an axis.

More complex shapes can be generated by boolean operations on a set of interacting volumes. The simplest examples, resulting from the intersection of two or more vaults and the successive subtraction of the excess volumes, are:

- The Groin vault or Cross Vault, resulting in a set of lunettes (either of circular or pointed vaults);
- The Domical Vault – and the particular case of the Cloister – which is formed by a set of fuses;
- The Umbrella Vault, a set of ribbed fuses, joint at the top and terminating in lunettes at the base;
- The Pendentive or Penditive dome, generated by subtracting volumes from a dome;
- The Saddle Vault, generated by either translating one parabola through a second one or by a ruled surface.

The actions performed to make these solids are the same needed to generate them in a CAD or – to some extent – in a FEM software to analyse them.

=== Gaussian curvature and shape-resistant structures ===
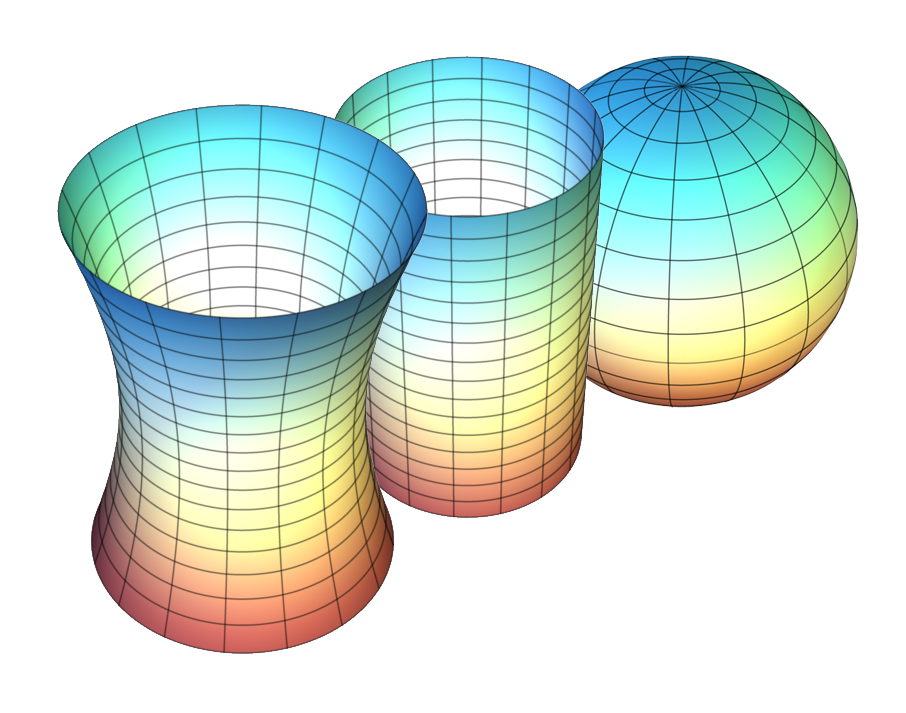
Example of surfaces to which all the possible surfaces can be reduced to. Starting from the foreground: the Hyperboloid (negative), the Cylinder (null), and the Sphere (positive Gaussian curvature).

Differently from the post and lintel construction, which capacity depends on the resistance of the single members, curved structures can rely on their shape too. However, single curvature structures (that is, simple vaults) show less capacity than double curvature ones (e.g., domes, domical and cloister and saddle). This is because a simple vault – from a geometric point of view – corresponds to a developable surface, which has null Gaussian curvature, therefore it can be flattened to a planar surface with no distortion. Dome-like and saddle structures have respectively a positive and a negative Gaussian curvature, being shape-resistant structures par excellence.

== Architecture and engineering ==
All the typologies of arches, vaults and domes come from the operations stated in the previous section. They are comprehensively collected and explained in each correspondent Wikipedia article. Curved shapes were used in the past for covering large rooms in buildings, as happened for example in the Domus Aurea of Emperor Nero, the Basilica of Maxentius, the Pantheon, Rome, or Hagia Sophia. However, they could be used for infrastructures too. For instance, the Ancient Roman civilization exploited curved structures for bridges, aqueducts, sewage ducts, and arch-dam. The main materials of such constructions were Masonry and Roman concrete.

With the Industrial Revolution, the material chosen were more likely wrought, cast iron or, later, reinforced concrete. In this way, also the shape of the infrastructures started to change. Some example of curved structures were the Palm House, Kew Gardens by Richard Turner and Decimus Burton and The Crystal Palace by Joseph Paxton, or on the infrastructures side, the Garabit viaduct by Gustave Eiffel. Later in 20th century, Pier Luigi Nervi started studying the possibilities of reinforced concrete, building his famous ribbed hangars.

Many other structures have been built by exploiting curved surface. For instance, the Philips Pavilion in Brussels by Le Corbusier and L'Oceanogràfic in Valencia by Félix Candela and Alberto Domingo are two examples of exploitation of the hyperbolic paraboloid shapes.

=== The traditional construction process ===
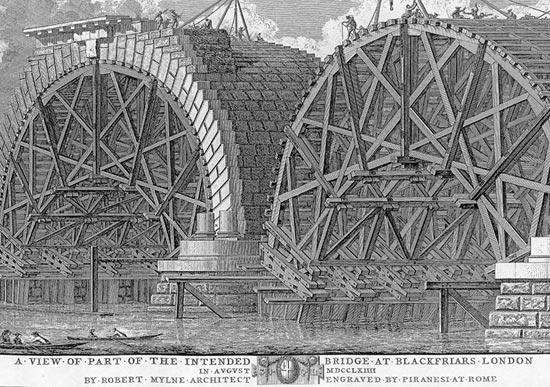
The original Blackfriars Bridge in London, in 1764. The engraving by Piranesi represents a vault under construction on the left (background) and the preparation of the centring on the right (foreground).

Because of their nature, curved structures cannot stand alone until their completion, especially vaults and arches. Therefore, the construction of a supporting structure (referred to as centring) is almost always necessary. These are temporary falsework which stay in place until the keystone has been set down and the arch is stabilised.

However, there are a few cases in which, by some expedient and careful design of the construction process, some structures have been erected without any centring. A widely known example is the domical vault of the Florence Cathedral, built by Filippo Brunelleschi in the 15th century. He achieved such a challenge by building a massive structure, mechanically behaving like a spherical dome, but with large ribs and exploiting the masonry herringbone bond to lean and fix every new layer on the previous one. Each layer of the structure seems to be composed by many small arches. The vault is also double-skin, with an intermediate hollow space hosting the staircases, through which air can flow to avoid humidity concentration. To resist parallel tensile stresses which may separate the fuses of the vault, Brunelleschi arranged sandstone chain along some parallel plane.

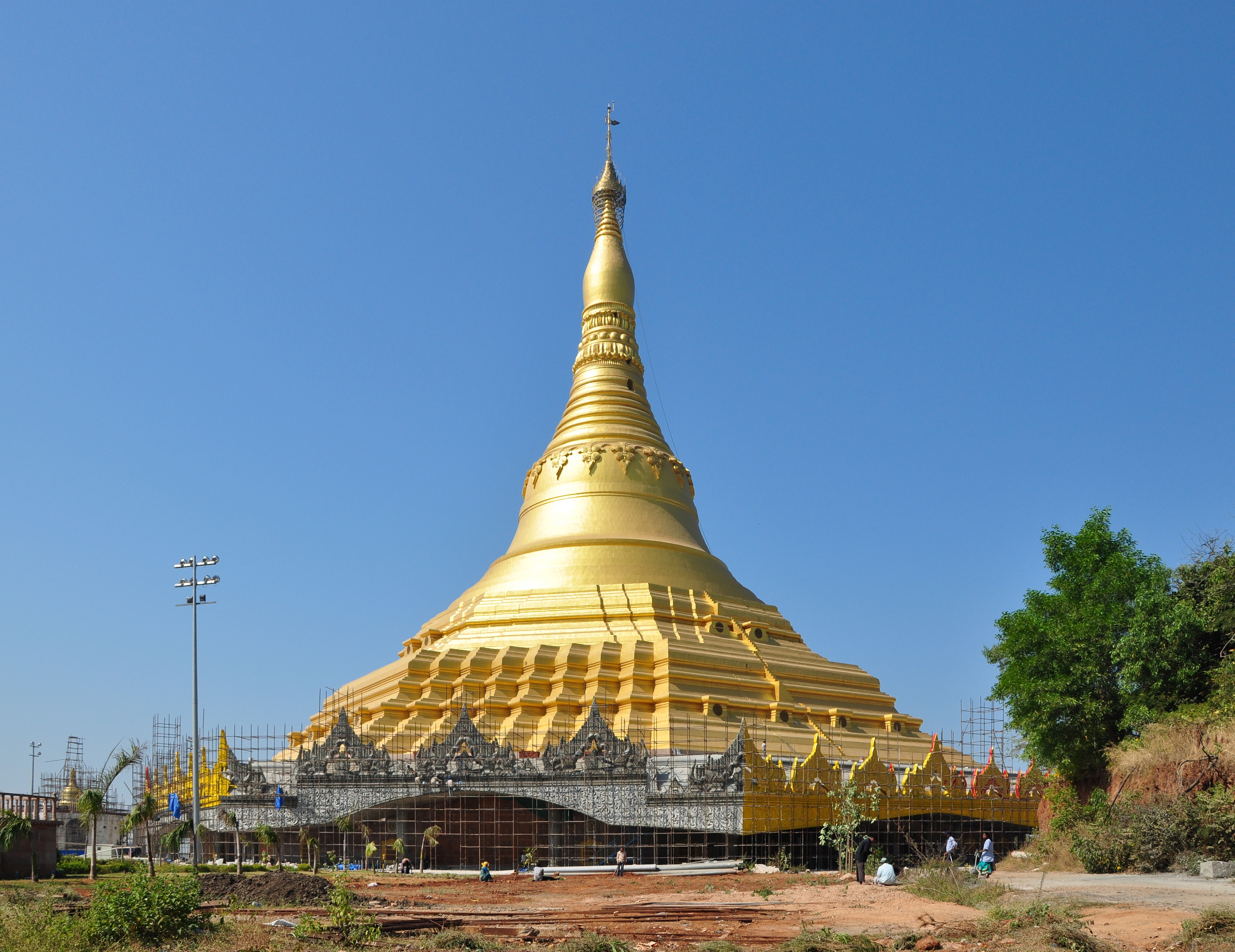
External view of the Global Vipassana Pagoda under construction.

Another example of structure built with no formwork is the Global Vipassana Pagoda, located in the North of Mumbai, between the Gorai Creek and the Arabian Sea. It is a meditation hall covered by the largest masonry dome in the world, with an inner diameter at ground level of about 85m. The absence of centring was possible thanks to the double curvature of the dome and the special shape given to the carved sandstone blocks constituting the skin.

=== Structural behaviour ===
The boundary conditions that would cause bending and shear stress in a post and lintel structure, in a curved structure cause just axial stress in the unit elements. Indeed, according to Professor de:Jacques Heyman, in the case of masonry curved structures (he referred especially to Gothic architecture), the assumptions of unlimited compressive resistance, null tensile and shear resistance and under the hypothesis of small displacements, it can be assumed that a structure is safe and stable until the funicolar polygon stays within the middle third of the cross section. This method has been widely used in the past because of its simplicity and effectiveness. However it is still studied by some scholars, and adapted to the three-dimensional case for double curvature.

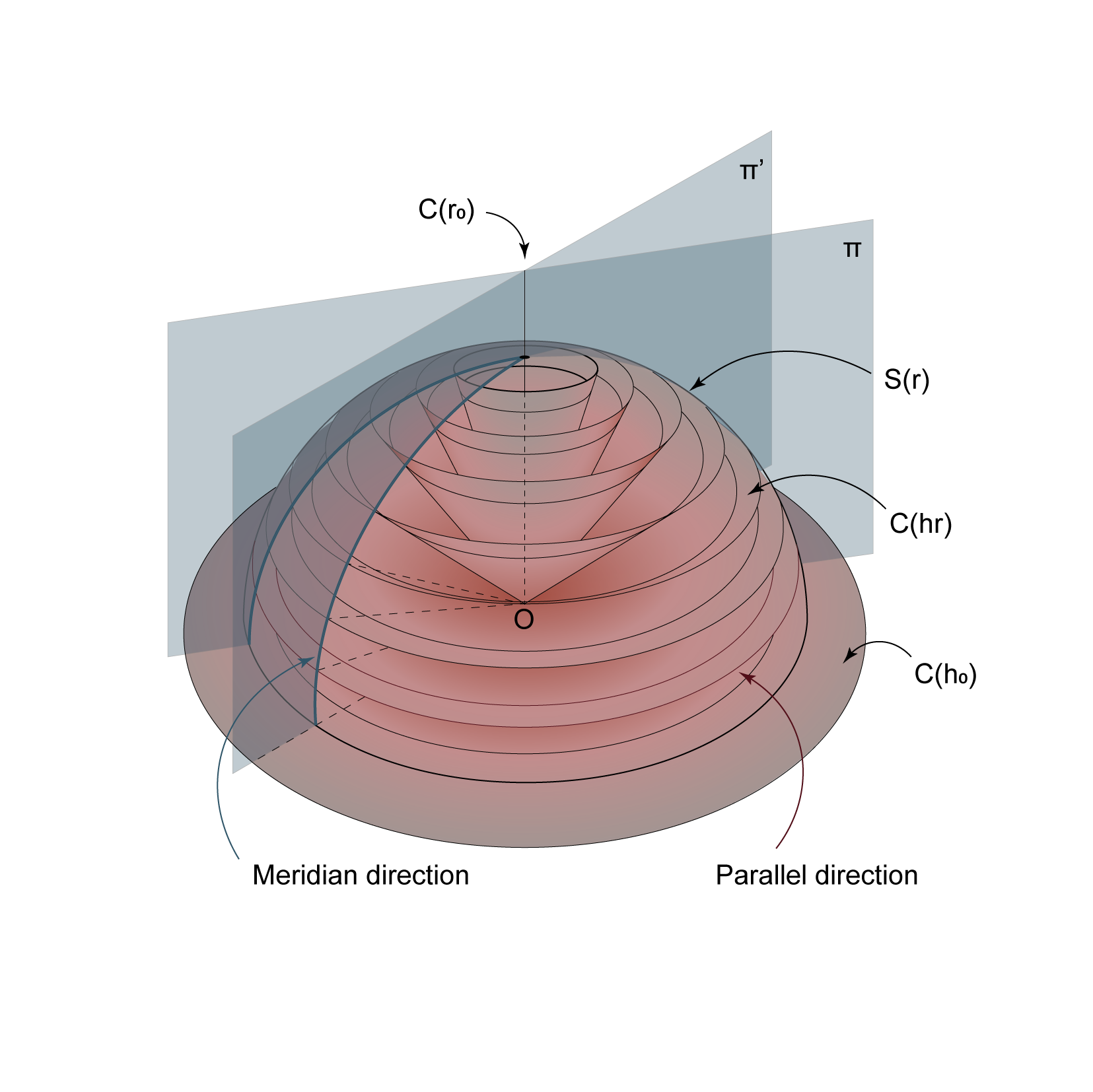
Identification of the meridian planes and of the conicalsurfaces on which the blocks are placed to confere the curvature.

Traditional masonry curved structures are often the result of the assemblage of many units, the Voussoirs. The resistance of an arch then, neglecting the possibility of a material failure, depends on the equilibrium of the voussoirs. Given the shape of vaults and domes instead, the double curvature plays a positive role in terms of stability as well as the arrangement of the single units (interlocking).

Studying the problem of a hemispherical membrane in a gravitational field, it can be demonstrated that the membrane undergoes compressive stress in its upper part, while it is subjected to hoop tensile stresses in the lower part (under 52° from the vertical axis of symmetry). This leads to the formation of meridian cracks, which tend to divide the dome in slices.

=== Daylighting ===
Daylighting is usually guaranteed by openings at the end of vaulted bays, as happens in Gloucester Cathedral, Chartres Cathedral, or Sainte-Chapelle (Paris), and specifically in the lunettes (where the vaults end against a wall) like in the Church of Santa Maria del Suffragio in L'Aquila (Italy) and in the Church of San Paolo in Albano Laziale (Italy).

Another structurally relevant place for an opening is the top of the domes, where in many cases an oculus can be found. Sometimes it is bare, as in the Roman Pantheon, while often is covered by another architectural element referred to as Lantern, as happens – for instance – in the Florence Cathedral.

=== Acoustics ===
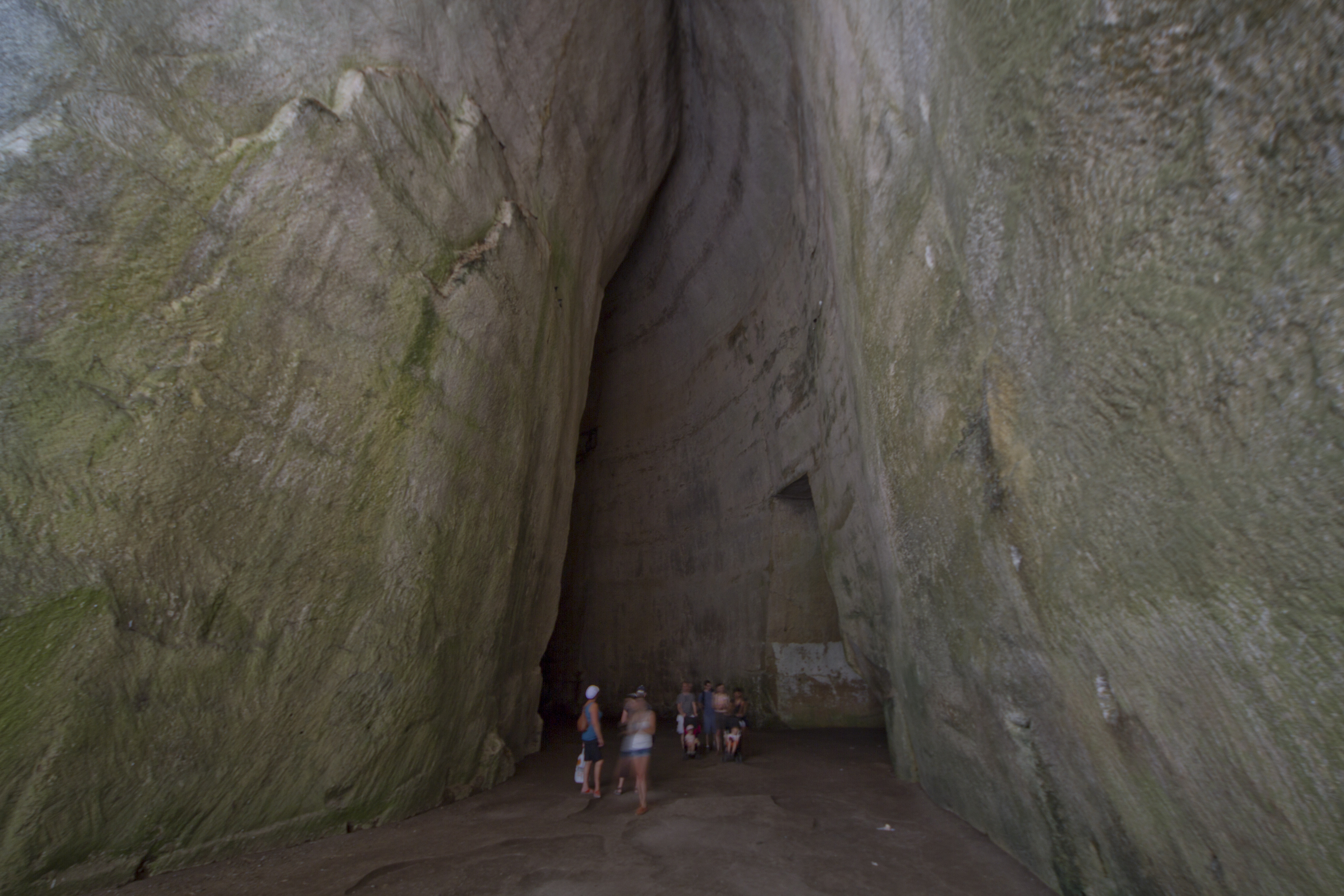
Inner side of the Ear of Dionysius, with a partial view of the surfaces that make it a whispering gallery.

Some double curvature structures are known for the echo or the reverberation phenomena they create. These are due to the size of the spaces and the materials exploited for the structure or the finishing (usually hard and with small pores). The shape does a lot in preventing or enhancing the effect. Cross or cloister vaults do not generate an echo. Pointed domes easily create reverberation more than echo. At the same time, spherical surfaces are highly reflective due to their concavity. Indeed, hemispheres, paraboloid, or similar surfaces are effective at reflecting and redirecting sound, sometimes constituting a whispering gallery. Examples of whispering galleries can be found in well-known architectures like St Paul's Cathedral in London, where the phenomenon has been studied by Lord Rauyleigh or the Archbasilica of Saint John Lateran in Rome, but also in caves like the Ear of Dionysius in Syracuse, Sicily, which has been treated by Wallace Clement Sabine.

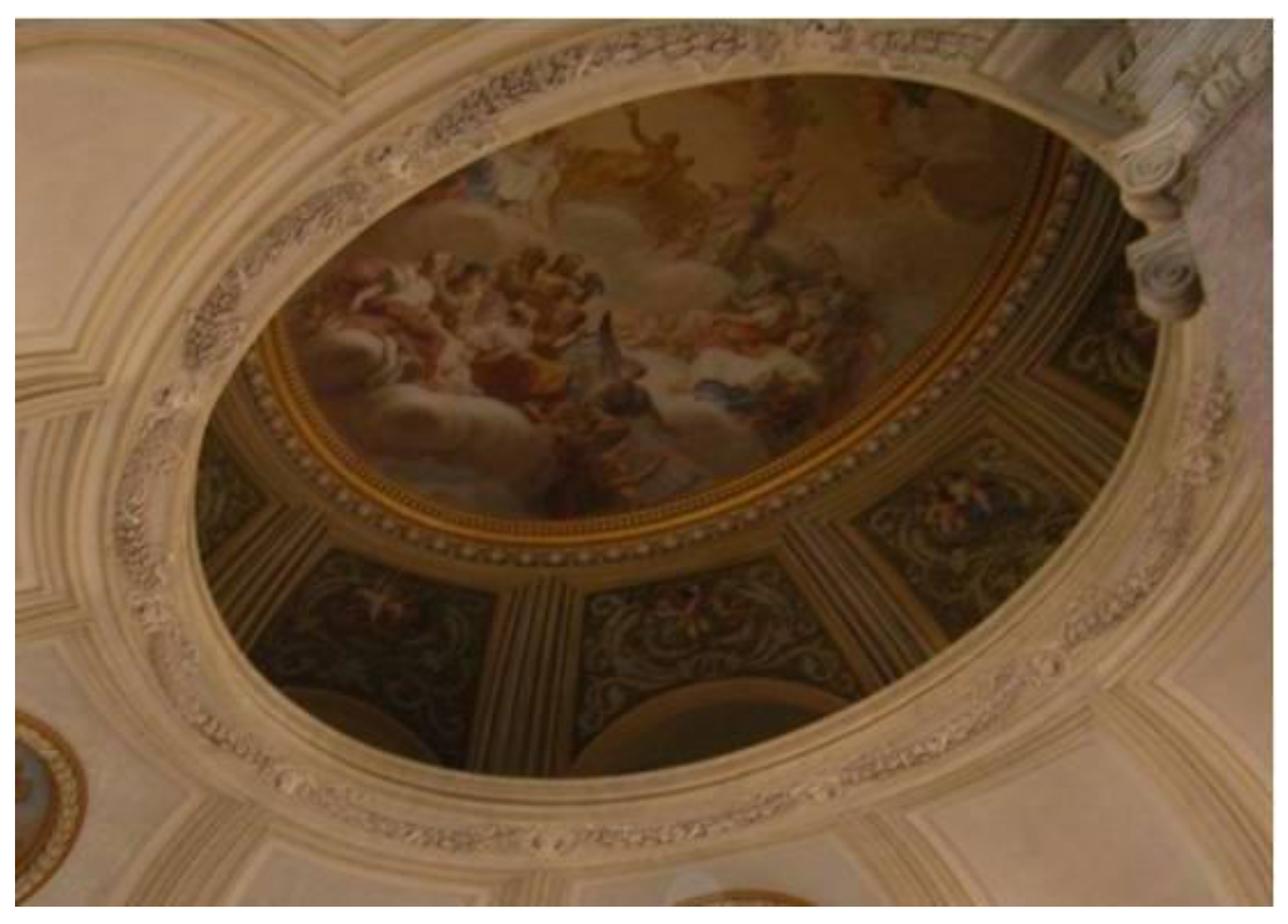
Double vault over the staircase of the Royal Palace of Caserta.

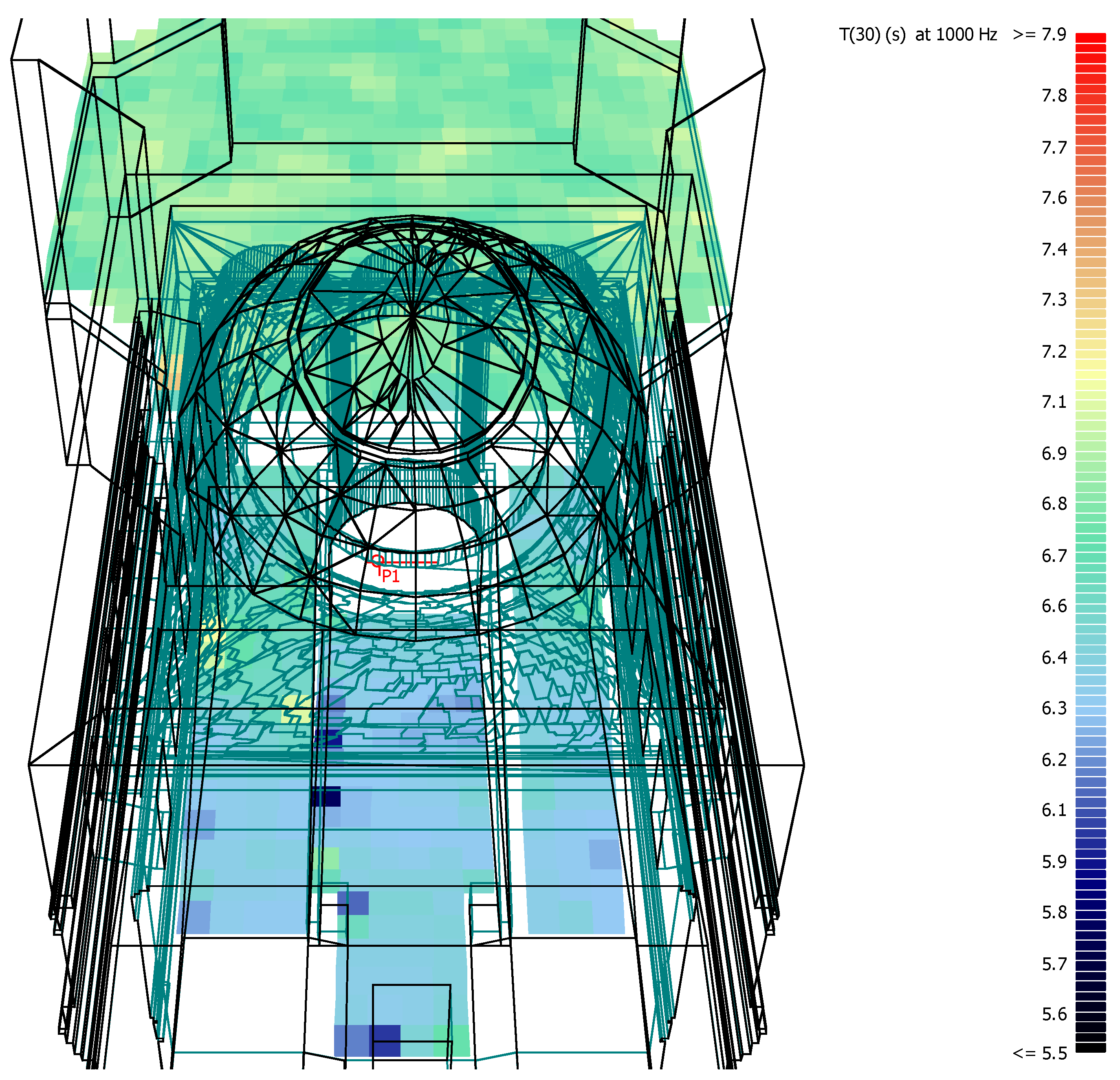
Spatial distribution of reverberation time (T30) in 1 kHz octave band (Royal Palace of Caserta, main staircase). One of the available acoustic analyses that can be performed to define a space.

The existing variety of domes is due to the assignation of symbolic meanings related to history and cultures, ranging from funerary to palatine and religious architecture, but also the response to practical problems. Indeed, a recent study addressed how in the Baroque staircase of the Royal Palace of Caserta (Italy), designed by Luigi Vanvitelli, the double dome could make the listeners feel as if they were enveloped by the music. Thus enhancing the marvel typically researched by baroque architects.

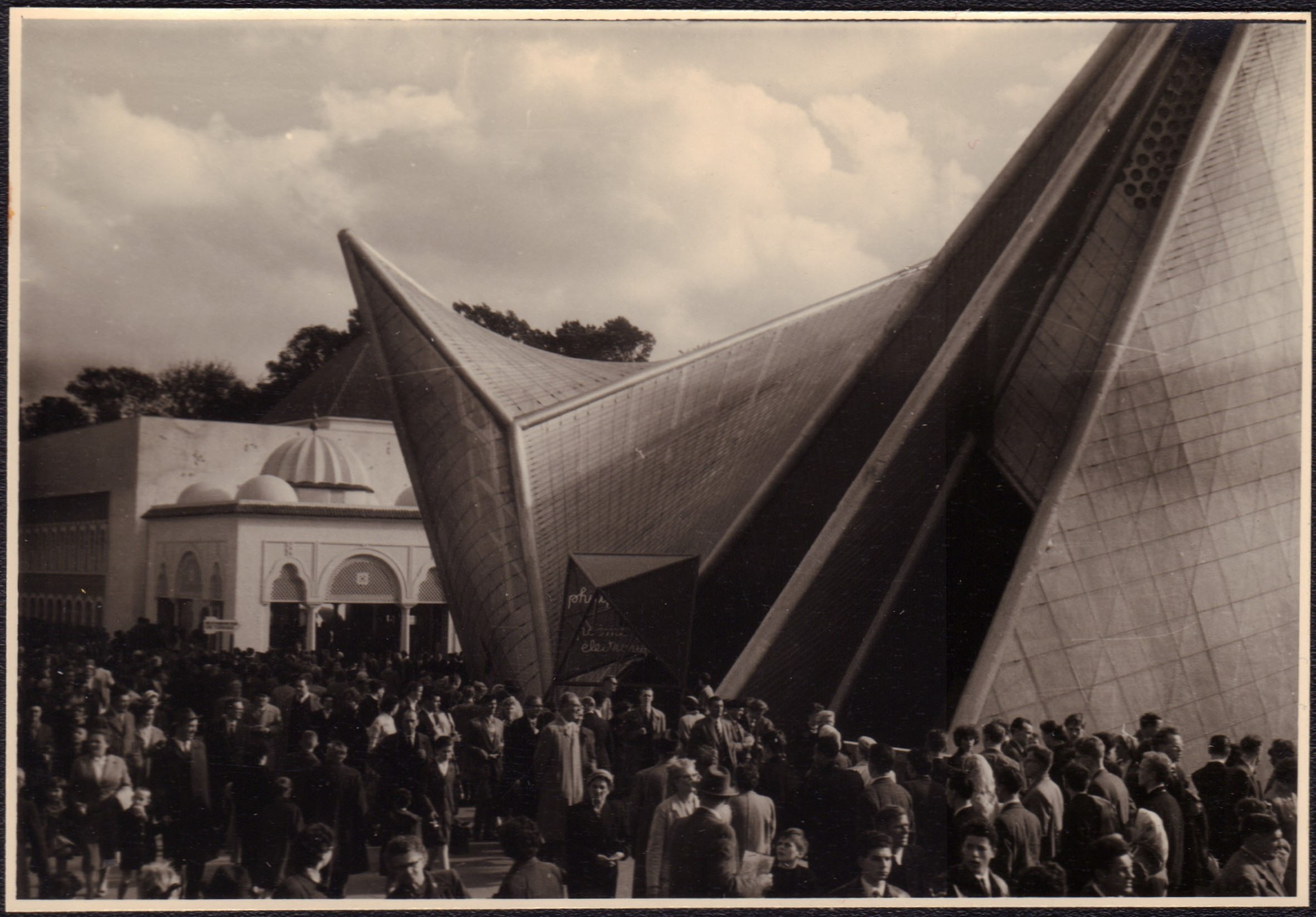
Philips Pavilion at Expo 58 in Brussels.

A modern example of architecture thought to respond and participate to sound was the Philips Pavilion designed by Le Corbusier and Iannis Xenakis for the Expo 58 in Brussels.

== See also ==
- Architectural acoustics
- Gaussian curvature
- Gothic architecture
- Gustave Eiffel
- Le Corbusier
- Luigi Vanvitelli
- Modern architecture
- Renaissance architecture
