= Charles Voysey (theist) =

English priest and freethought advocate (1828–1912)

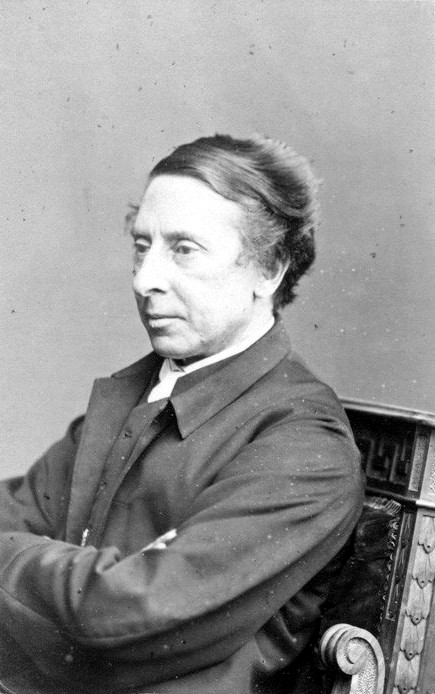
- Voysey in the 1860s
- Born: 18 March 1828; London
- Died: 20 July 1912 (aged 84); Hampstead
- Occupation(s): Priest, writer

Charles Voysey (18 March 1828 – 20 July 1912) was a former priest of the Church of England who was condemned by the Privy Council for heterodoxy and went on to found a theist church. He was the father of architect Charles Francis Annesley Voysey.

== Early life and career ==
Born in London on 18 March 1828, Voysey was the youngest son of architect Annesley Voysey, a relative of Samuel Annesley and of Susanna Wesley (née Annesley), mother of John and Charles Wesley.

He entered St Edmund Hall, Oxford in 1847 and received his B.A. from the University of Oxford in 1851. The following year he married Frances Maria Edlin and was ordained a priest in the Church of England in 1853, becoming the curate of Hessle. Voysey served in that position for seven years, also serving as vice-principal of Kingston College. His eldest son Charles F. A. Voysey was born in Hessle in 1857. Voysey was appointed curate of St Andrew's, Craigton, Jamaica in 1858, where he lived for 18 months.

In 1862, after his return to England, he served as curate of Great Yarmouth for six months before being appointed to the curacy of St Mark's, Whitechapel.

== Condemnation for heterodoxy ==
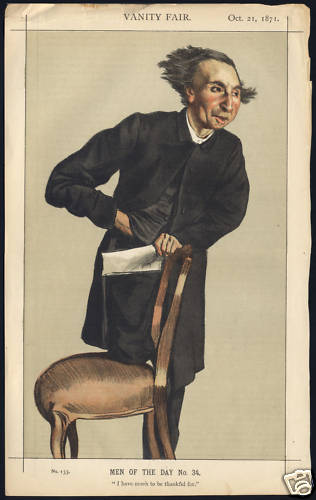
"I have much to be thankful for" As depicted by James Tissot in Vanity Fair, 21 October 1871

In 1863 Voysey was removed from the curacy of St Mark's, Whitechapel after preaching a sermon denying the doctrine of eternal punishment. He was recommended for the curacy of St Mark's, Victoria Docks. After a brief period as curate of North Woolwich he became curate and eventually Vicar of Healaugh near Tadcaster, in 1864, but soon ran into difficulties there.

From Healaugh he commenced writing his most famous work The Sling and the Stone. Originally published in monthly parts, it was eventually collected into ten volumes, the first of which was published in 1865. His youngest son Rev. Ellison Annesley Voysey (born 1867 in Healaugh), was Oxford educated, and became a Theist Church promoter in England and Ireland. Ellison Voysey's daughter, Ella Annesley Voysey, married the actor Robert Donat in 1929.

His work The Sling and the Stone had been immediately condemned by the conservative wing of the Anglican Church in 1865. As additional volumes were added, William Thomson, Archbishop of York, began proceedings against him in 1869. He was summoned before the Chancery Court of York for heterodox teaching, where he defended his case for two years. He appealed to the Judicial Committee of the Privy Council which gave its judgement on 11 February 1871:

"The Appellant is charged with having offended against the Laws Ecclesiastical by writing and publishing within the diocese of London certain sermons or essays, collected together in parts and volumes, the whole being designated by the title of "The Sling and the Stone," in which he is alleged to have maintained and promulgated doctrines contrary and repugnant to or inconsistent with the Articles of Religion and Formularies of the Church of England."

His appeal dismissed, Voysey lost his benefice.

== The Theistic Church and later life ==
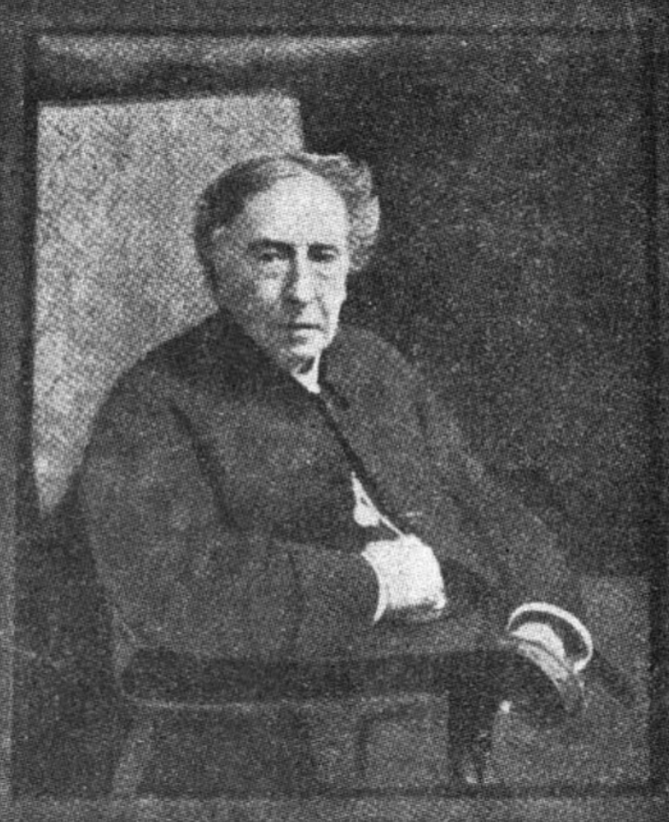
Voysey photographed in old age

Before the judgement, Voysey had begun holding services in London at St George's Hall, Langham Place, attracting a number of sympathisers. These gatherings eventually formalised as an independent religious denomination under the name of the Theistic Church. For use at services Voysey published The Revised Prayer Book in 1871 which retained much of the content of the Book of Common Prayer, rewording and removing specific references to Christ, the Trinity, and other distinctively Christian doctrines.

He wrote in 1873 to The Index on the subject of "Funeral Rites" and "The Custom of Mourning". His principal objection to the latter practice was that "Mourning tends to perpetuate unhappy and false views of death... Death ought to be looked upon as at least as much of a heavenly boon to the beloved one, as a source of bitter pain to ourselves.".

His teaching was based upon a pure theism, without a miraculous element. While retaining belief in God, in prayer, and hope for life beyond death, Voysey denied the perfection of Jesus and the authority of the Bible. He would spend much of his remaining career publishing books, sermons, articles, and pamphlets criticising traditional Christian doctrines, and defending his version of theism against critics.

The congregation took over the Swallow Street Church in 1885 just off Regent Street in central London, where he continued to hold services for nearly thirty years. The building was altered and refitted by his son C. F. A. Voysey whose work included the removal of the upper gallery, the insertion of "Cathedral glass" in all windows, "painting, papering and colouring throughout", and a new entrance at the north end of the façade. The congregation obtained a new lease of the property in 1898, and the building was again repaired by C. F. A. Voysey. The spire was removed in or shortly after 1901.

He befriended Guy Aldred, the "Boy Preacher" in Holloway, in 1903, a friendship that would last through conversation and correspondence until Voysey's death. Aldred would credit Voysey with being influential in his intellectual journey and for being an important figure in Britain's freethought movement.

Voysey died at his home, Annesley Lodge, at Platts Lane in Hampstead (which had been designed for him by his son in 1895), on 20 July 1912. His congregation soon dispersed and the Swallow Street building was closed in 1913 and demolished shortly thereafter.

== Selected publications ==
- The Doctrine of Jesus Concerning God (1872)
- Theism: Or, The Religion of Common Sense (1894)
- Theism as a Science of Natural Theology and Natural Religion (1895)
- Religion For All Mankind, Based on Facts Which Are Never in Dispute (1903)
