= Hertfordshire Archives and Local Studies =

- Interactive map of Hertfordshire Archives and Local Studies
- 51.7914°N 0.0804°W
- Location: Register Office Block, County Hall, Hertford, Hertfordshire, SG13 8EJ
- Website: www.hertfordshire.gov.uk/hals

Hertfordshire Archives and Local Studies (HALS) is the archival department of Hertfordshire County Council. HALS is a joint service of Hertfordshire County Record Office and the Hertfordshire Country Local Studies Library.

== Scope ==
HALS collects and preserves archival materials from 1060 onwards, relating to the county of Hertfordshire.

HALS is part of the County Archives Research Network (CARN) and holds Archive Service Accreditation.

== Organisations ==
HALS holds the records of:

- East and North Hertfordshire Teaching NHS Trust
- Hertfordshire Coroner Area
- Hertfordshire Community NHS Trust
- Hertfordshire Partnership University NHS Foundation Trust
- West Hertfordshire Teaching Hospitals NHS Trust
- NHS East and North Hertfordshire Clinical Commissioning Group
- NHS Herts Valleys Clinical Commissioning Group
- Hatfield Magistrates Court
- Hertford Magistrates Court
- Hertford County Court
- St Albans Magistrates Court
- St Albans County Court
- Stevenage Magistrates Court
- Watford Magistrates Court
- Watford County Court
