= Healthcare in Hertfordshire =

Healthcare in Hertfordshire was the responsibility of the Herts Valleys, East, and North Hertfordshire clinical commissioning groups until July 2022.

== History ==
From 1947 to 1965 NHS services in Hertfordshire were managed by the North-West Metropolitan, East Anglian and North-East Metropolitan regional hospital boards. In 1974 the boards were abolished and replaced by regional health authorities. Hertfordshire came under the North West Metropolitan RHA. Regions were reorganised in 1996 and Hertfordshire came under the North West Thames Regional Health Authority. Hertfordshire was one of the area health authorities, subdivided into four district health authorities: North, East, South West and North West. In 1993 the county was divided into three health authorities: East and North Hertfordshire; North West Hertfordshire; South West Hertfordshire. Regional health authorities were reorganised and renamed strategic health authorities in 2002. Hertfordshire was under Bedfordshire and Hertfordshire SHA. In 2006 regions were again reorganised and Hertfordshire came under NHS East of England until that was abolished in 2013. There was one primary care trust for the area.

== Commissioning ==
In October 2017 the two CCGs decided that obese patients “will not get non‐urgent surgery until they reduce their weight” unless there are “exceptional circumstances” and Smokers would not be referred for non-urgent surgery “unless they have stopped smoking for eight weeks or more”. They also decided to reduce funding for In vitro fertilisation from three cycles to one for patients who meet the criteria; that female sterilisation will only be funded in exceptional circumstances; that gluten-free food will not be available on prescription for most patients who need it; and that over the counter medicines will no longer be prescribed except in exceptional circumstances.

Herts Valleys needs to save £45 million in 2017-18 to break even. East and North Hertfordshire needs to save £23 million.

== Sustainability and transformation plan ==
The sustainability and transformation plan for the county includes both Hertfordshire and West Essex. It claims that the use of the hospital sector will be reduced and the use of community and primary care sector increased. There is no clear account of how the problems with local hospitals are to be tackled. Paul Burstow was appointed to chair the partnership in November 2018.

== Primary and community care ==
Primary and community care services are provided by Hertfordshire Community NHS Trust.

== Acute care ==
The main providers of NHS acute hospital care in the county are West Hertfordshire Teaching Hospitals NHS Trust and East and North Hertfordshire Teaching NHS Trust. Ambulance services are provided by East of England Ambulance Service. There has been longstanding criticism of hospital facilities in the area. In 2019 West Herts 21st Century Hospital Solution, a local campaign group engaged BDP Healthcare to produce plans for a new acute general hospital in West Hertfordshire. They say this would be “financially feasible and far preferable to existing plans to carry out piecemeal repairs”, but NHS managers say this option vastly exceeds the funding threshold, and they propose to apply for £350 million of central government funding for “significant investment” at Watford General Hospital, upgrades to surgery facilities at St Albans City Hospital and the consolidation of Hemel Hempstead Hospital.

== Mental health ==
NHS Mental Health services are provided by Hertfordshire Partnership University NHS Foundation Trust.

== See also ==
- Category:Health in Hertfordshire
- Healthcare in the United Kingdom
