= East and North Hertfordshire Teaching NHS Trust =

- Former name: East and North Hertfordshire NHS Trust
- Type: NHS trust
- Established: 13 March 2000
- Headquarters: Coreys Mill Lane, Stevenage, SG1 4AB
- Hospitals: Hertford County Hospital; Lister Hospital; New QEII Hospital; Mount Vernon Cancer Centre
- Chair: Anita Day
- Chief executive: Martin Armstrong
- Website: www.enherts-tr.nhs.uk

East and North Hertfordshire Teaching NHS Trust is a NHS trust which runs Lister Hospital, Mount Vernon Cancer Centre, the New QEII Hospital, Hertford County Hospital, Bedford Dialysis Unit, St Albans Dialysis Unit, Chiltern Kidney Centre and Harlow Renal Unit.

== History ==
East and North Hertfordshire NHS Trust was created in March 2000, by merging the former East Hertfordshire and North Hertfordshire NHS trusts.

The Trust took over the Lister Surgicentre from Clinicenta, a subsidiary of Carillion in September 2013 after the centre was severely criticised by the Care Quality Commission and local MPs. The revenue cost of the take over to the Trust is said to be £2.3 million. The Department of Health paid £53 million for the premises.

In April 2025, the Department of Health and Social Care approved the Trust's request to add 'Teaching' to its name, reflecting its ongoing commitment to education, training, and teaching. The Trust works in partnership with the University of Hertfordshire, University of Cambridge and UCL Medical School.

In June 2026, former Chief Finance Officer and Deputy Chief Executive Martin Armstrong was appointed Chief Executive of East and North Hertfordshire Teaching NHS Trust, following the departure of former Chief Executive Adam-Sewell Jones.

== Performance ==
The Trust's best performance since it was founded, achieving virtually every national clinical, operational, and financial standard set was during 2010/11. Trust chief executive Nick Carver said: "Patients coming to our hospitals today now have a shorter wait for their treatment than in previous years, are unlikely to have their procedure cancelled at the last minute, and will be discharged as planned. The chances of their becoming infected with something like MRSA or Clostridioides difficile have plummeted, and the quality and range of clinical services provided through our hospitals have improved considerably".

It spent 7.8% of its total turnover on agency staff in 2014/5. In the last quarter of 2015, it had one of the worst performances of any hospital in England against the four-hour waiting target. It ended 2015/6 in deficit of £16 million. It was fined a total of £605,000 under the Late Payment of Commercial Debts (Interest) Act 1998 from 2014-7.

In October 2019, experts warned health leaders that Mount Vernon Cancer Centre's aging facilities, outdated equipment, and staff shortages endangered patient safety and care quality. The centre's future is under review; one potential option is to relocate it to Watford General Hospital.

In November 2023, the most recent inspection by the Care Quality Commission rated the Trust as "requires improvement".

== See also ==
- Healthcare in Hertfordshire
- List of NHS trusts
