= HealthRoster =

Employee scheduling software

HealthRoster (formerly MAPS) is Employee scheduling software for e-rostering, used in the National Health Service produced by Allocate Software.

It provides a computerised method for efficiently managing when staff are required to work and to ensure wards and departments have the right staff in the right place at the right time. It is used by over 80% of electronically rostered NHS trusts to plan and roster their staff. It permits bank nurses to check shifts that are available on their phones or computers at home. Version 11, which can be used on a tablet, was released in 2020, responding to demands created by the COVID-19 pandemic in the United Kingdom. It uses the SafeCare patient acuity model supplied by Imperial College Innovations Limited.

Hertfordshire Partnership University NHS Foundation Trust uses the software, which was installed in October 2007, to manage staffing of 160 different areas of nursing. The manager says it is much more efficient than their previous paper-based system, especially as it could keep a record of requests.

It is used in University Hospitals Coventry and Warwickshire NHS Trust, where it was used by Alison Leary in her study of safe nurse staffing. Warrington & Halton Hospitals NHS Foundation Trust claims it has permitted them to reduce the use of bank and agency staff.

Derbyshire Community Health Services NHS Foundation Trust has established a Responsive Workforce Model using HealthRoster Software and SafeCare, which they say has been crucial in permitting them to reduce expenditure on agency staff, ensured quality and freed up nurses for hands-on care. Matrons and ward managers can now organise their rotas more efficiently which enables them to be fairer with staff and frees them up to spend more time on direct patient care.
