= Mary Pownall =

British sculptor (1890–1937)

Mary Pownall, later Mary Bromet, (1862–1937) was a British sculptor. She was active from 1890 until 1937 and was particularly associated with Watford.

== Biography ==
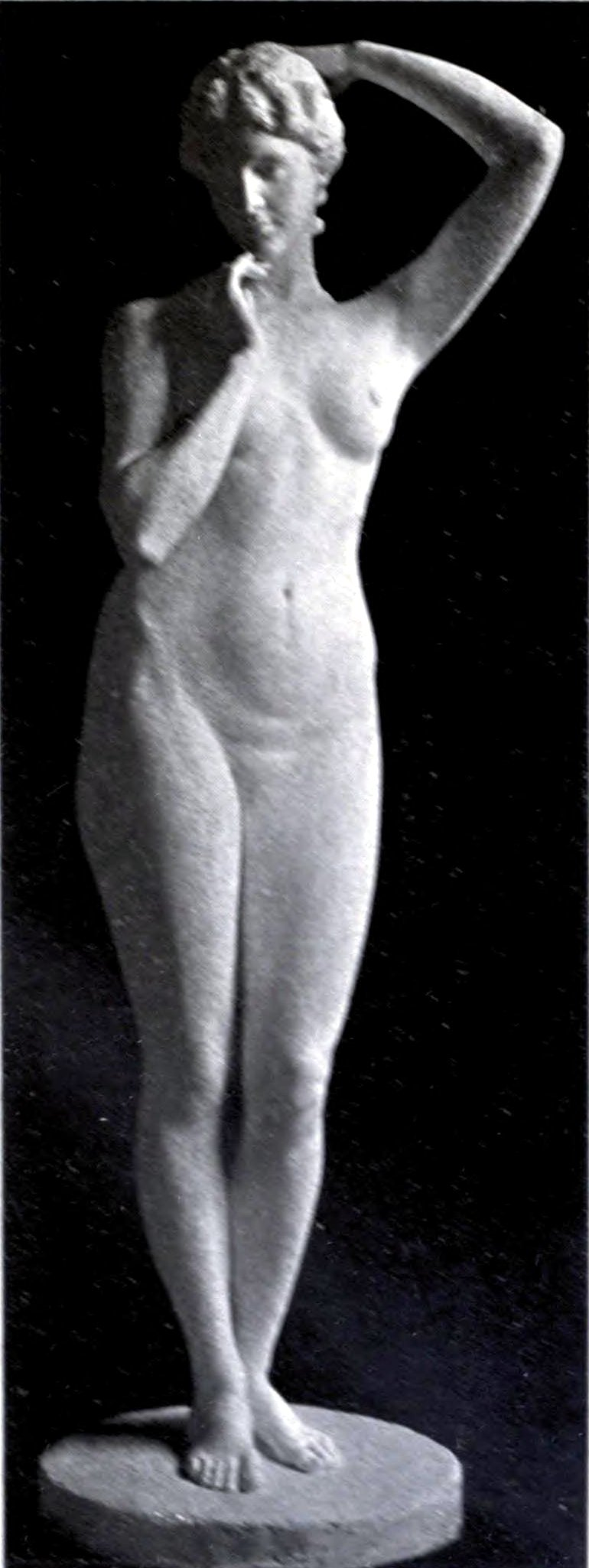
Maiden Meditation

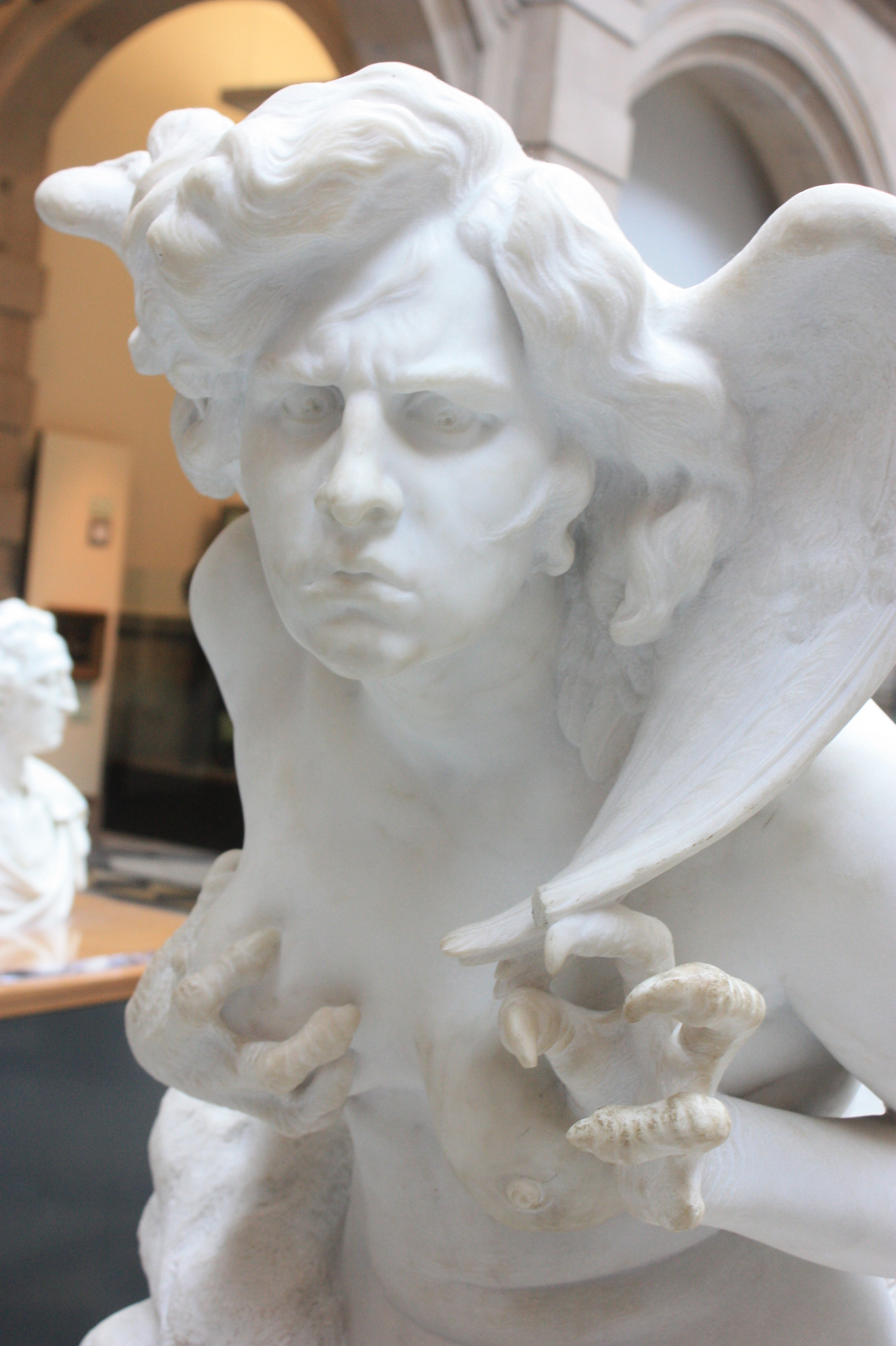
The Harpy Celaeno, 1902, by Mary Pownall, Kelvingrove Art Gallery

Pownall was born in Leigh in Lancashire in 1862. In the 1890s she was living in Birkenhead. She studied in Frankfurt in 1896 and in Paris from 1897 to 1898 where she was taught by Jean-Baptiste Champeil and Denis Puech. She was also tutored by Auguste Rodin. Pownall exhibited at the Paris Salon from 1893 to 1899 and received an honourable mention for her work at the 1899 Exposition Universelle. She then studied in Rome from 1898 to 1901. In Rome she lived at 53b Via Margutta. Between 1897 and 1925 she regularly showed pieces at the Royal Academy in London.

In 1902 she married Alfred Bromet, a barrister, but she continued to use her maiden name for her work. From 1903 to 1931 they lived at Lime Lodge, Pinner Road in Watford. Pownall was elected an associate member of the Royal Society of British Artists in 1932. In 1935 she wrote an illustrated autobiography, Response, under the name Mary Pownall Bromet. She died in Oxhey Village in Hertfordshire on 25 February 1937.

Bromet School in Oxhey Village - several minutes' walk from her former Lime Lodge home - is named in her honour.

== Works ==
- Edward Villiers, 5th Earl of Clarendon (c.1900) first mayor of Watford
- The Harpy Celaeno, Kelvingrove Art Gallery (1902)
- Love or Money (1906)
- An Intruder (1906)
- The Great Specialist (1907)
- A Ragamuffin (1907)
- A Bolshevik Communist (1923)
- An Aviator (c.1925)
- Ralph Edward Thorpe (1927) second mayor of Watford
- Three bronze figures for the Watford Peace Memorial, Watford Town Hall (unveiled 1928 at the Peace Memorial Hospital)
- Politics (1931)
- Acquedotts Claudio, Roma
- A Sunbeam
- The Kiss
- A La Recherche de la Brebis Perdu
- Mercury
- Maiden Meditation
