= King Edward VI College =

King Edward VI College can refer to:

- King Edward VI College, Nuneaton
- King Edward VI College, Stourbridge
