= Katharine Lloyd-Williams =

British anaesthetist

- Born: 14 February 1896; Oswestry, Shropshire, England
- Died: 10 January 1973 (aged 76); Faro, Portugal
- Education: Bedford Physical Training College, London School of Medicine for Women, University of London
- Occupations: anaesthetist, general practitioner, medical educator

Katharine Georgina Lloyd-Williams CBE (14 February 1896 – 10 January 1973) was a British anaesthetist, general practitioner and medical educator. She was a consultant anaesthetist at the Royal Free Hospital from 1934 and dean of the Royal Free Hospital School of Medicine from 1945, retiring from both posts in 1962.

== Biography ==
Lloyd-Williams was born on 14 February 1896 in Oswestry. She attended Queen Anne's School from 1908 to 1915 and Bedford Physical Training College from 1915 to 1917. She taught in physical education in a Kingston upon Hull school for two years, then worked for another two years as a physiotherapist at St Thomas' Hospital in London. She enrolled in the London School of Medicine for Women in 1921 and graduated as MBBS in 1926. She was awarded an MD in 1929 from the University of London.

After graduating, Lloyd-Williams held house posts at the Royal Free Hospital and the Elizabeth Garrett Anderson Hospital. In 1928, she became a resident anaesthetist at the Royal Free, and also opened a general practice in Bloomsbury. After serving as honorary anaesthetist to numerous London hospitals in the early 1930s, in 1934 she was appointed consultant anaesthetist at the Royal Free, a position she held until 1962. She was made dean of the London School of Medicine for Women in 1945 and oversaw its redevelopment as the Royal Free Hospital School of Medicine (now UCL Medical School), which was open to male and female students. She remained dean of the Royal Free medical school until 1962, and was also dean of the medical faculty of the University of London from 1956 to 1962. Her main clinical interest was obstetric anaesthesia and analgesia, and she published a textbook on the topic, Anaesthesia and Analgesia in Labour, in 1934.

She was elected FFARCS (Fellow of the Faculty of Anaesthetists, Royal College of Surgeons) in 1948, and served as president of the Medical Women's Federation in 1958–59. She was made a Commander of the Order of the British Empire (CBE) in 1956. After retiring in 1962, she lived in Lampeter. She died on 10 January 1973 while holidaying in Faro, Portugal.

Lloyd-Williams was featured in the Royal College of Physicians Women in Medicine project, showcasing women clinicians and those who have inspired them, selected for inclusion by Professor Ramani Moonesinghe.
