= King Edward VI College, Nuneaton =

King Edward VI College

Location
- King Edward Road; Nuneaton, Warwickshire, CV11 4BE; England; 52.521835°N 1.461782°W

Information
- Type: Sixth form college
- Motto: The Sixth Form Specialist ....Nurturing Talent, Achieving Excellence
- Established: 1552; 474 years ago
- Founder: King Edward VI
- Local authority: Warwickshire
- Department for Education URN: 130840 Tables
- Ofsted: Reports
- Principal: Stuart Noss
- Gender: Co-educational
- Age: 16 to 19
- Enrolment: 1,400 (approx.)
- Former name: King Edward VI Grammar School, Nuneaton
- Website: http://www.ke6n.ac.uk/

King Edward VI College is a sixth form college located in Nuneaton, England, in Warwickshire. Currently, it teaches subjects in preparation for A-level examinations, for students generally aged sixteen to eighteen. The college presently accommodates approximately 1400 students from Warwickshire, West Midlands and neighbouring counties.

== History ==
Grammar school

King Edward VI Grammar School came into being on 11 May 1552 as a grammar school, following the grant of a royal charter by King Edward VI. The school was originally a fee-paying school, although the county council provided some scholarships, and became non-fee paying as a result of the education act of 1944. The voluntary aided school had around 400 boys in the 1960s.

Sixth form college

In 1974 the grammar school closed and was re-established as King Edward VI College.

Former Heads

- Tim Rogers 2019–2020
- Uly Lyons 2015–2019
- Esther Maughan 2008–2015
- Martin Ward 2004–2008
- Keith Butterworth 2000–2004
- David Smith 1996–2000
- Rowland P Brown OBE 1967–1975

== Site ==
The oldest surviving school building located in the grounds of St Nicolas parish church dates from 1595, was rebuilt in 1696 and was used as a school until 1880. In 1880, the grammar school was relocated to the current site on King Edward Road, the other side of the churchyard. The new building was built in a Tudor style by the architect C.C. Rolfe. The college was frequently extended during the 20th century to accommodate growing numbers of students. The Arnold Building, a new building opposite the main college site, was completed in 1994. In 2006, another small building was constructed next to the Arnold Building to hold the history department.

The New College

In recent years, the college has expanded its site with a new Study Centre, a specifically designed modern Art Block, Law Classrooms, Physics Labs, a re-developed library and Student Refectory.

Rope Walk Shopping Centre

In 2022, "King Edward VI College is to set-up a new 'centre of excellence' from the transformed space above Nuneaton's old Woolworth's store. It has been confirmed that the sixth form college is the first tenant to take over the unit above the former Woolworths in Queens Road.

The first floor of 22 Queens Road has been given an almost £1m makeover to turn it into useable space and this has included a new entrance from the Ropewalk Shopping Centre side of the building. The college, known as KEGS, will use this space to create a centre of excellence for the Creative Arts and Tech Ed, as well as a Higher Education Centre for Nuneaton.

Nuneaton and Bedworth Borough Council has championed the transformation of the 'Ropewalk Chamber' using Town Deal funds. Town Hall leader, councillor Kris Wilson, said: "This development will enable King Edwards’ students to study in high-quality, modern accommodation that is safe, accessible and close to other amenities."

== Extracurricular activities ==
The Student Voice

A codified constitution was created in 2007 which made provisions for student representation in college affairs. It identified two institutions responsible for representing the students of the college; the 'College Council' which consists of representatives from each tutor group in the college and the 'Student Executive Committee', which consists of six elected positions:

- Male Chair – Chairs and oversees council meetings
- Female Chair – Chairs and oversees council meetings
- Treasurer – Manages the council's budget
- Secretary – Responsible for the minutes of each meeting
- Entertainments Officer – Arranges college parties, charity events etc.
- Press Officer – Deals with the promotional activities involved in organising all events undertaken by the committee

Collectively the College Council and Student Executive Committee are responsible for: organising charity fund-raising events, College Parties and the end of year Valedictory Ball. They are also involved in planning the annual "Celebrating Student Achievement Evening", they meet with the Board of Governors and may make proposals regarding various student/college-related issues to the Principal of the College.

Sports teams

The Nuneaton Old Edwardians Rugby Football Club (RFC) was initially founded in 1910 to provide rugby football for former pupils of the Grammar School, the club went open in 1955 allowing players from all backgrounds to join. The club is still active and as of 2012 is participating in the Midlands 1 East League.

Enrichment activities

The college offers an enrichment programme which is designed to offer a wide range of sporting and recreational opportunities to students. These timetabled activities take place once a week and are compulsory for first-year students. Although enrichment is not compulsory for students after their first year, they are free to continue with it if they choose. Activities include various sporting activities, participation in college media (e.g. the college newspaper, radio station and film-making club) and a variety of clubs/societies.

Alumni Association

The King Edward VI College Alumni Association was launched in May 2011 by former students Vicky Fowler and Mohsin Shah. The association is open to all former college students and staff members. It aims to organise social and network events for former students of the college, provide careers advice support for current students and promote the work of King Edward VI College within the local community.

== Academic performance ==
The college offers 45 AS and A level courses, and an additional range of GCSE and BTEC courses. Around 40% of students gain grades A or B at A level and the pass rate is at the average for the sixth-form sector, the highest performing sector in education at 98%. Virtually all BTEC students earn Merit grades or better. Student retention is high at 95%. Every year around six students go to Oxford or Cambridge Universities. Almost all students – 99.2% – achieve positive destinations: the majority, 75%, go onto university, 5% go onto further education or apprenticeships, and around 20% gain employment. The college has frequently won awards for having the top-performing student in the summer examination series across a range of subjects. Mathematics, biology, chemistry and physics students win Olympiad Gold, Silver and Bronze Medals every year.

The college achieved an overall grade 2 (good), in its most recent OFSTED inspection in May 2015.

== Secondary schools ==
The college offers higher level students from local secondary schools the opportunity to undertake additional AS/A level courses.

== Notable alumni ==
King Edward VI College

- Marcus Jones, politician, Conservative Member of Parliament for Nuneaton (2010–2024)
- Karen Masters, astrophysicist, professor at Haverford College

King Edward VI Grammar School

- David Bates, historian, Director of the Institute of Historical Research (2003-2008)
- Sir Ewen Broadbent, senior civil Servant
- Robert Burton, author of 'Anatomy of Melancholy'
- William Burton, author of 'Description of Leicestershire'
- Geoffrey de Havilland, aviation pioneer
- Bill Hays, stage and television director
- Sir Chris Husbands, Director of the Institute of Education (2011–2015), Vice-Chancellor, Sheffield Hallam University (2016–present)
- Jim Lee, Radio 4 announcer
- Ken Loach, television and film director
- Henry Plumb, politician, MEP for the Cotswolds (1979-1999), President of the European Parliament (1987–89)
- Sir Philip Randle, biochemist
