= Gillian Hanson =

British physician

Gillian Coysh Hanson FRCP FRCA
- Born: 25 March 1934
- Died: 23 May 1996 (aged 62); London Docklands
- Education: Royal Free Hospital School of Medicine, London
- Spouse: Roger Farrand
- Children: 3
- Awards: FRCP FRCA
- Scientific career
- Fields: Intensive care medicine, Diabetes mellitus
- Workplaces: Whipps Cross Hospital

Gillian Coysh Hanson FRCP FRCA (25 March 1934 – 23 May 1996) was a British physician who specialised in intensive care and the treatment of diabetes mellitus. She established and led the intensive care unit at Whipps Cross Hospital from 1968 to 1993.

== Career ==
Gillian Coysh Hanson was born in 1934 to John Hanson, a metallurgist and chemist. She attended the Royal Free Hospital School of Medicine in London (now part of UCL Medical School), graduating in 1957. She worked at Whipps Cross Hospital as a medical registrar and research fellow. Her early research focused on a hyperbaric oxygen chamber, which was then being used to treat gas gangrene and tetanus.

Hanson led the establishment of an intensive care unit (ICU) at Whipps Cross Hospital, and when it opened in 1968, she was appointed the physician in charge of the unit. This made her the first consultant physician placed in charge of a British ICU, and the youngest consultant in London at the time. The ICU at Whipps Cross became an international exemplar of intensive care, and Hanson co-authored the first textbook on intensive care therapy. In 1984, Hanson co-wrote a book entitled The Critically-Ill Obstetric Patient with Roger Walter Middleton (R.W.M) Baldwin; the book is featured in several medical libraries.

Hanson later became interested in parenteral nutrition, obstetric medicine and diabetes mellitus, and in 1993 she left the intensive care unit to work on the treatment of diabetes in the community and at a specialised diabetic care centre at Whipps Cross Hospital.

== Affiliations and memberships ==
Hanson was appointed as an examiner of the Royal College of Physicians, and was a fellow of both the Royal College of Physicians and the Royal College of Anaesthetists.

== Personal life ==
Hanson married Roger Farrand, with whom she had three children. They resided in the London Docklands. Right after her retirement in 1996, she and her husband embarked on a trek to Everest Base Camp in the Himalayas, after which she developed pneumococcal sepsis, and her husband developed pneumonia. Hanson died soon after from septicaemic shock; "she was a world expert on the management of this condition".
