= John William Kibukamusoke =

Ugandan medical doctor and academic

- Born: 11 July 1932; Uganda
- Died: 13 August 2009 (aged 77); Sydney, Australia
- Citizenship: Australian, Ugandan
- Education: Makerere University (MBBS) (Bachelor of Medicine and Bachelor of Surgery); UCL Medical School (Internal Medicine); Liverpool School of Tropical Medicine (Tropical Medicine); Armed Forces Institute of Pathology (Pathology)
- Occupations: Physician; Professor; Researcher; Diplomat / High Commissioner
- Years active: 1954–2009
- Known for: Medicine; Scholarly research; Uganda's ex-President Amin's personal physician

John William Kibukamusoke was a Ugandan medical doctor, an academic, and a personal physician to former Ugandan president Idi Amin (during his early rule), and the first appointed Ugandan High Commissioner to Australia. He was appointed a physician to Pope Paul VI during the Pope's pilgrimage to Uganda in 1970.

== Background and education ==
Kibukamusoke was born in Uganda on 11 July 1932. He obtained his medical degree, an MB ChB, from Makerere University's external medical degree program in London in 1954. This qualification was later converted to an MBBS (Makerere) in 1964.

Kibukamusoke specialized in internal medicine and tropical medicine, completing his training in the United Kingdom. Following his training, he was appointed as a specialist physician at Mulago Hospital, in Kampala, Uganda. He took on the role of Professor of Medicine at Makerere University. In addition to his teaching and clinical work, Kibukamusoke conducted research in nephrology, specifically on the topic of nephrotic syndrome in quartan malaria.

He fled Uganda, in 1973, due to Amin's dictatorship to live a "quiet life" with his family. He accepted an ambassadorship to Australia in 1980. He played a key role in establishing Uganda's high commission in Australia and normalizing diplomatic relations between the two nations. Upon completion of his diplomatic term, he remained in Australia – although he continued his scholarly work globally up to the time of his death.

== Roles and achievements ==
Kibukamusoke's career was marked by several roles. From 1967 to 1973, he served as a Professor of Medicine at Makerere University. He then moved to the University of Zambia, where he continued his professorship from 1973 to 1978. In 1980, he was appointed as the first Ugandan High Commissioner to Australia, a position he held until 1982. Following this diplomatic role, he worked as a consultant physician and kidney specialist in Australia from 1982 to 1997.

He was once Idi Amin's personal doctor and revealed insights about Amin's state of health to the London Observer. He also served as a personal doctor to Pope Paul VI – during his visit to Uganda in 1970.

He was elected President of the College of Physicians of East Africa on two occasions (1963 & 1965). A pioneer in cancer research, Kibukamusoke was the first African President of this association.

He was also elected as the Chairman of the East African Medical & Agricultural Research Council (1963–1973).

== Awards ==
- The Ugandan Independence Medal for his service to the pope.

== Other considerations ==
During his retirement, he penned a romantic novel titled "Venus and Leartra".

== Death ==
He died in Sydney of heart failure on 13 August 2009. His remains were transported back to Uganda for burial.
