= Watford Peace Memorial =

War memorial in Watford, England

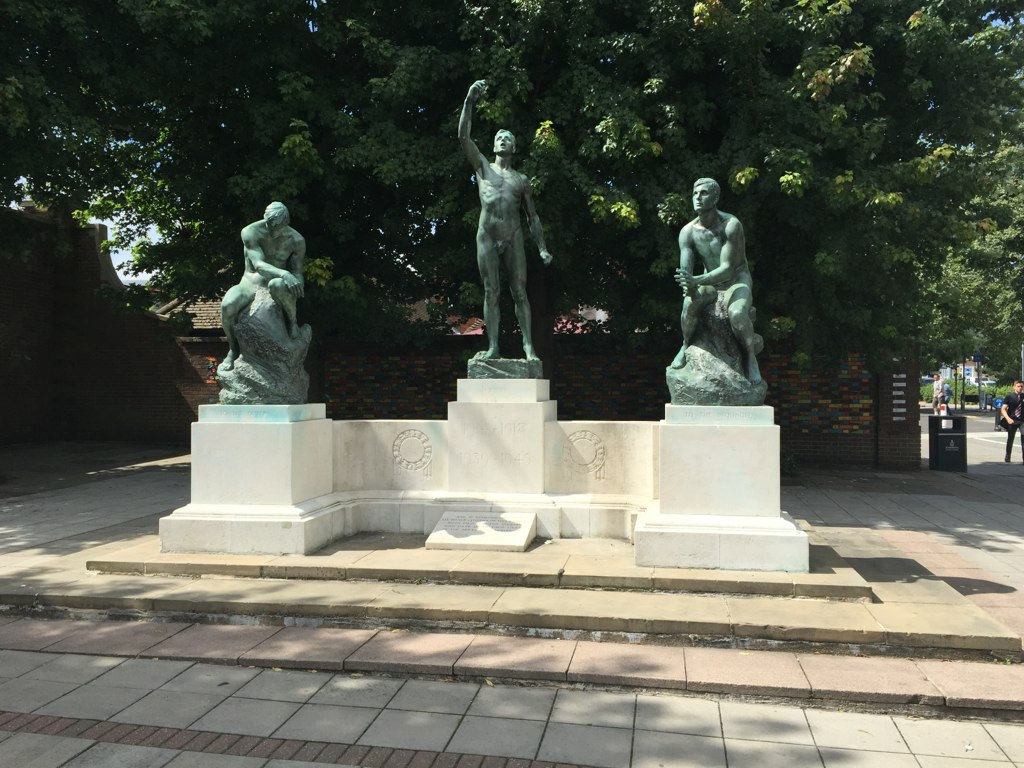
Watford War Memorial

Watford Peace Memorial is a war memorial now located outside the Town Hall in Watford, Hertfordshire, England. It comprises three bronze sculptures of nude males on a white Portland stone base. The sculptor was Mary Pownall Bromet, a student of Auguste Rodin: it is her only war memorial, and a rare example of a war memorial by a woman. It is also an unusual example of a war memorial that incorporates nude sculptures.

The memorial was originally constructed outside the Peace Memorial Hospital in Watford, now the Peace Hospice, which was initially funded by public subscription to commemorate the dead of the First World War. The bronze sculptures are based on plaster figures which Bromet had donated to the hospital. The three figures represent, left: "To The Fallen", a seated man grieving; centre, "Victory", a man standing with right arm raised; and right, "To The Wounded", a seated man. The bronzes were cast at the Morris Singer foundry, and the memorial was unveiled by George Villiers, 6th Earl of Clarendon on 1 July 1928.

When the hospital closed, the memorial was moved in 1971 to a location on The Parade outside Watford Town Hall. It was restored in 2013 to remove copper staining and algae. The streaked weathered patina of the bronzes was retained, as the artist had intended them to age. It was granted a Grade II listing in 1983, and upgraded to Grade II* in 2017.

== See also ==
- Grade II* listed buildings in Watford
- Grade II* listed war memorials in England
