= West Hertfordshire Teaching Hospitals NHS Trust =

NHS hospital trust

- Type: NHS trust
- Established: 23 March 2000
- Headquarters: Watford, Hertfordshire, England
- Hospitals: Hemel Hempstead Hospital; St Albans City Hospital; Watford General Hospital
- Chair: Catherine Dugmore
- Chief executive: Matthew Coats
- Staff: 4,951 (2018/19)
- Website: www.westhertshospitals.nhs.uk

West Hertfordshire Teaching Hospitals NHS Trust runs three National Health Services hospitals: Watford General Hospital, St Albans City Hospital and Hemel Hempstead Hospital, in Hertfordshire, England. It provides "acute healthcare services to a core catchment population of approximately half a million people living in west Hertfordshire and the surrounding area". The Trust also "serves people living in North London, Bedfordshire, Buckinghamshire and East Hertfordshire".

The trust is part of the East of England Local Education and Training Board, and has students from UCL Medical School.

In July 2016 Katie Fisher from the Royal Free London NHS Foundation Trust took over as Chief Executive. She left in March 2018.

== History ==
The trust was established on 23 March 2000, and became operational on 1 April 2000. In December 2021, the Trust achieved 'teaching trust' status, amending their name.

The COVID-19 pandemic stimulated the development of virtual wards across the British NHS. Patients are managed at home, monitoring their own oxygen levels using an oxygen saturation probe if necessary and supported by telephone. The trust managed around 1200 patients at home between March and June 2020 and planned to continue the system after COVID-19, initially for respiratory patients.

== Finance ==
It has wrestled with the financial difficulties of running on several sites for many years. In June 2012 it was proposed to develop a local general hospital on the Hemel Hempstead Hospital site. In January 2015 the trust was operating with a deficit of £16.3 million - at that point in the year £4.3 million worse than planned, but with expectation of hitting its budgeted deficit target of £14 million. A loan for £11.1 million towards the trust's capital costs has been approved by the Department of Health; a request for another £22.7 million of temporary borrowing was at that point still being considered. In February 2016 it was expecting a deficit of £37.2 million for the year 2015/6.

The trust is expecting about £400 million capital funding from the government's new infrastructure fund for the rebuilding of Watford General Hospital, which will come with a 3.5% yearly interest charge.

== Criticism and praise ==
Former Chief Executive Samantha Jones was named by the Health Service Journal (HSJ) as Chief Executive of the Year in November 2014. The Trust's daily Onion patient safety meeting, "an initiative aimed at improving patient care and empowering hospital staff to raise concerns about the quality of care provided", was also Highly Commended in the 2014 HSJ Awards The Onion's name refers to "the scheme ‘peeling back the layers’ within its hospitals".

== Performance ==
In December 2013 the Trust was one of thirteen hospital trusts named by Dr Foster Intelligence as having higher than expected higher mortality indicator scores for the period April 2012 to March 2013 in their Hospital Guide 2013. The mortality rate subsequently fell by a quarter, an improvement credited to issues raised and dealt with at Onion meetings.

The trust was one of 26 responsible for half of the national growth in patients waiting more than four hours in accident and emergency over the 2014/5 winter.

It was put into special measures In September 2015 after the Care Quality Commission rated its services as “inadequate”. The inspectors found A&E patients at Watford General facing long delays before they were examined by a doctor where unqualified staff assessed A&E arrivals, and there was a dangerous lack of nurses. The problems were attributed to understaffing over a long period and excessive use of agency and locum staff. It moved out of special measures in January 2018 following a CQC inspection where it was rated as 'Requires improvement'.

It spent 9.7% of its total turnover on agency staff in 2014/5.

Because it failed to meet the NHS targets for elective treatment - 92 patients had waited more than a year in October 1918 - the Herts Valley Clinical Commissioning Group decided to fine the trust £500,000 a month until its performance reaches the national target of 92%. The money will be spent on private and specialist providers. The trust expects at least a £53 million deficit for 2018–19.

== Maternity ==
Following a Care Quality Commission inspection in April 2015 the Trust decided to suspend the private obstetric service at Watford General Hospital. This affected 27 mothers due to give birth after May 1.

== See also ==
- Healthcare in Hertfordshire
- List of hospitals in England
- List of NHS trusts
