= Grade II* listed buildings in Watford =

There are over 20,000 Grade II* listed buildings in England. This page is a list of these buildings in the district of Watford in Hertfordshire.

== Watford ==
Name	Location	Type	Completed (Note: The date given is the date used by Historic England as significant for the initial building or that of an important part in the structure's description.)	Date designated	Grid ref. (Note: Sometimes known as OSGB36, the grid reference is based on the British national grid reference system used by the Ordnance Survey.) Geo-coordinates	Entry number (Note: The "List Entry Number" is a unique number assigned to each listed building and scheduled monument by Historic England.)	Image
Frogmore House	High Street, Watford	House	1716	26 August 1952	TQ1168495761; 51°38′58″N 0°23′14″W	1175515	Frogmore House More images
Little Cassiobury and Former Stable Block to Rear	Watford	House	Late 17th century	26 August 1952	TQ1035596970; 51°39′38″N 0°24′21″W	1175392	Little Cassiobury and Former Stable Block to Rear More images
The Mrs Elizabeth Fuller Free School	Watford	Free School	1704	26 August 1952	TQ1107396230; 51°39′14″N 0°23′45″W	1348086	The Mrs Elizabeth Fuller Free School More images
Watford Peace Memorial	The Parade, Watford	War memorial	1928	7 January 1983	TQ1052996890; 51°39′36″N 0°24′12″W	1348116	Watford Peace Memorial More images
