= Philip Randle =

British medical researcher (1926–2006)

Sir Philip John Randle FRS
- Born: 15 July 1926; Nuneaton, Warwickshire, England
- Died: 26 September 2006 (aged 80); Oxford, England
- Education: King Edward VI Grammar School, Nuneaton; Sidney Sussex College, Cambridge; UCL Medical School
- Known for: Randle cycle of carbohydrate and fat metabolism
- Awards: Knighted, 1975
- Scientific career
- Fields: Biochemistry
- Workplaces: Cambridge University, University of Bristol, Oxford University
- Thesis: Studies on the Metabolic Action of Insulin
- Doctoral advisor: Frank George Young

Sir Philip John Randle (16 July 1926 – 26 September 2006) was a British biochemist and medical researcher after whom the Randle cycle is named.

== Early life and education ==
Born 16 July 1926 in Nuneaton, Warwickshire, Randle was educated at King Edward VI Grammar School, Nuneaton; Sidney Sussex College, Cambridge, where he read the Natural Sciences Tripos, graduating with first-class honours and an M.A.; University College Hospital and the UCL Medical School, where he read medicine and graduated with an M.D.

After qualifying as a medical doctor, Randle returned to the University of Cambridge to undertake a Ph.D. under Professor Frank George Young. For his doctoral thesis entitled "Studies on the Metabolic Action of Insulin", he was awarded his Ph.D. in 1955 and was immediately appointed lecturer in biochemistry at the university.

== Career ==
In 1964 he was appointed founding professor of biochemistry at the University of Bristol where he built a strong department which carried out original research into mitochondrial transporters, molecular enzymology, protein structure, and mammalian metabolism.

In 1975 he moved to be founding professor and chairman of the Department of Clinical Biochemistry at Oxford, holding the post until 1993.

He was elected a Fellow of the Royal Society in 1983 and was President of the Biochemical Society from 1995 to 2000. He was knighted in 1975.

== Research ==
Randle was a prominent diabetes mellitus researcher who described the eponymous Randle Cycle of carbohydrate and fat metabolism. This resulted from work to test the theory that cardiac and skeletal muscle can alternate between carbohydrate and fat as their energy source. The Randle Cycle describes how the products of fatty acid oxidation in muscle reduces the use of glucose, allowing individuals to switch between fuels according to their carbohydrate intake and suggests a potential mechanism for the development of hyperglycaemia and type 2 diabetes.

He went on to monitor individuals on a low carbohydrate diet and those with non-insulin dependent diabetes. The results were in agreement with the mechanism he described, suggesting that the key factor in the development of diabetes could be the excessive release of fatty acids in muscle tissue.

The mechanism is still the subject of debate and further research.

== Personal life ==
Randle died in Oxford on 26 September 2006. He was married to Elizabeth Harrison (d. 2004) and had son Peter and three daughters, Susan, Sally, and Rosalind.
