= Amanda Ramirez =

Amanda Ramirez (Amanda-Jane Ramirez) is Professor of Liaison Psychiatry, director of the Promoting Early Presentation Group at King's College London, director of Informed Choice about Cancer Screening at King's Health Partners and National Clinical Lead for Cancer Patient Information, National Cancer Action Team, now part of NHS Improving Quality.

She earned her medical degree at UCL Medical School and trained as a psychiatrist at Guys and St Thomas’ NHS Foundation Trust.

Ramirez co-authored the NICE guidance on Supportive and Palliative Care (2004), writing on improving patient information, face-to-face communication and psychological support.

She is a Fellow of the Royal College of Psychiatrists.

== Selected publications ==
- Bish, A; Ramirez, A; Burgess, C; Hunter, M (2005). "Understanding why women delay in seeking help for breast cancer symptoms". Journal of Psychosomatic Research. 58 (4): 321–6. doi:10.1016/j.jpsychores.2004.10.007. PMID 15992567.
- Burgess, C; Cornelius, V; Love, S; Graham, J; Richards, M; Ramirez, A (2005). "Depression and anxiety in women with early breast cancer: Five year observational cohort study". BMJ. 330 (7493): 702. doi:10.1136/bmj.38343.670868.D3. PMC 555631. PMID 15695497.
- Burgess, C; Hunter, M. S.; Ramirez, A. J. (2001). "A qualitative study of delay among women reporting symptoms of breast cancer". The British Journal of General Practice. 51 (473): 967–971. PMC 1314188. PMID 11766868.
- Ramirez, A. J.; Craig, T. K.; Watson, J. P.; Fentiman, I. S.; North, W. R.; Rubens, R. D. (1989). "Stress and relapse of breast cancer". BMJ: British Medical Journal. 298 (6669): 291–293. doi:10.1136/bmj.298.6669.291. PMC 1835577. PMID 2493899.
