= New QEII Hospital =

- East and North Hertfordshire Teaching NHS Trust
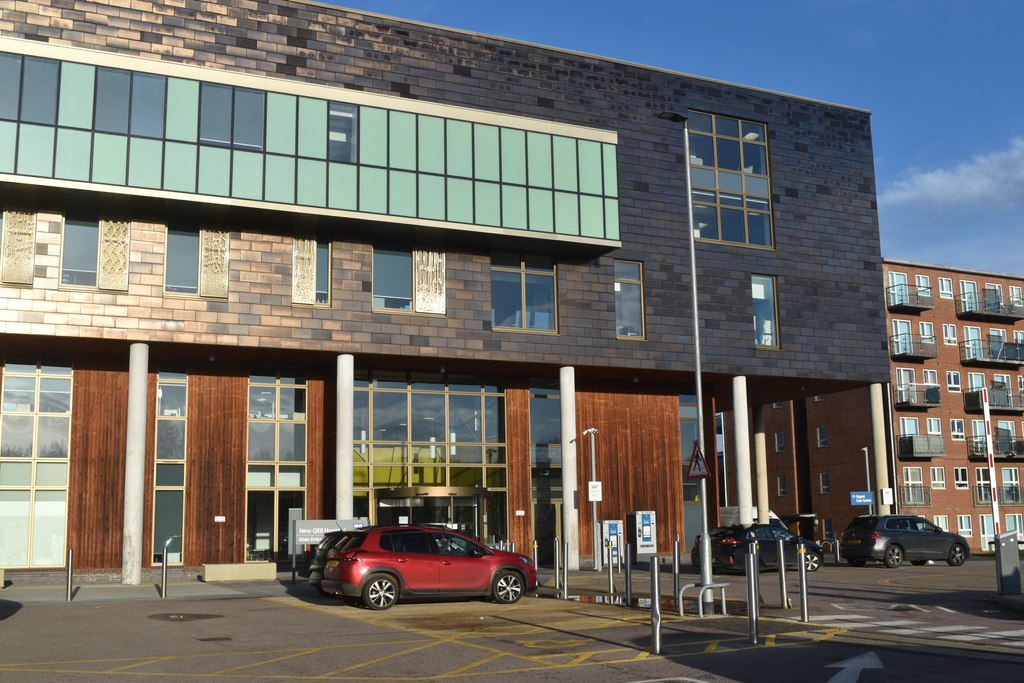
- The main hospital building in 2024

- Shown in Hertfordshire

Geography
- Location: Welwyn Garden City, Hertfordshire, England, United Kingdom
- Coordinates: 51°46′58″N 0°11′14″W

Organisation
- Care system: Public NHS
- Type: General
- Affiliated university: University of Hertfordshire

Services
- Emergency department: No Accident & Emergency
- Beds: None

History
- Founded: 6 November 2015; 10 years ago

Links
- Website: https://www.newqeii.info/
- Lists: Hospitals in England

The New QEII Hospital (also known as New Queen Elizabeth II Hospital) is located in Welwyn Garden City and managed by East and North Hertfordshire Teaching NHS Trust.

== History ==
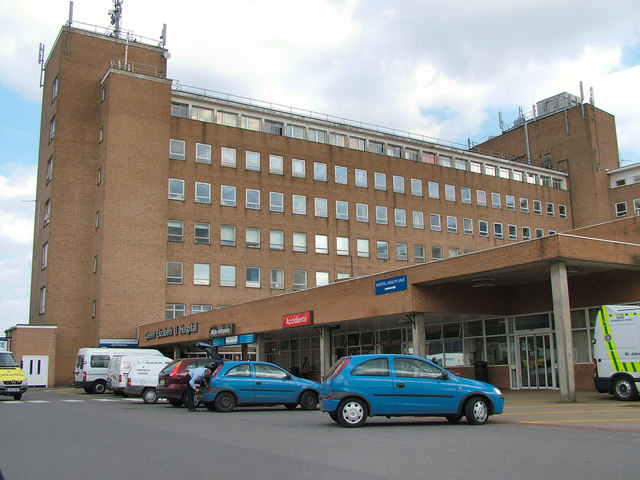
The old Queen Elizabeth II hospital

The hospital was commissioned in 2013 by the East and North Hertfordshire NHS Trust, at a cost of £30 million. It was designed by the architects Penoyre & Prasad. It was officially opened by Alistair Burt, the Minister for Community and Social Care at the time, and Simon Stevens, the Chief Executive of NHS England on 6 November 2015.

The hospital replaced the Queen Elizabeth II Hospital. This hospital was opened by the Queen in July 1963, replacing the Welwyn Garden City Cottage Hospital in Church Road. All inpatient and emergency services were transferred to the Lister Hospital at Stevenage in October 2014.

The old hospital was demolished and that part of the site was subsequently developed by Bellway in 2017.

== Services ==
The hospital provides GP services, outpatient clinics, diagnostic (radiology, pathology and endoscopy), a breast unit and antenatal and postnatal care, as well as an urgent care centre.
