= Ramani Moonesinghe =

British medical doctor

Prof Ramani Moonesinghe OBE MD(Res) FRCP FRCA FFICM SFFMLM
- Education: University College London
- Occupations: Professor of Perioperative Medicine and Consultant in Anaethestics and Critical Care

Ramani Moonesinghe is Professor of Perioperative Medicine at University College London (UCL) and a Consultant in Anaesthetics and Critical Care Medicine at UCL Hospitals. Moonesinghe was director of the National Institute for Academic Anaesthesia (NIAA) Health Services Research Centre between 2016 and 2022, and between 2016 and 2019 was Associate National Clinical Director for Elective Care for NHS England. In 2020 on she took on the role of National Clinical Director for Critical and Perioperative care at NHS England and NHS Improvement.

Her career has been profiled in The Lancet and BMJ and she was the Royal College of Anaesthetists' contemporary nomination for the "Women in Medicine, a celebration" exhibition at the Royal College of Physicians.

== Education ==
Moonesinghe graduated from UCL Medical School in 1997, where she was president of the medical students' union, and did her postgraduate training in internal medicine at Guy's and St. Thomas' Hospitals. In 2015, Moonesinghe began a fellowship in Improvement Science with the Health Foundation.

Moonesinghe has reported she was inspired by Katharine Lloyd-Williams, an anaesthetist and educationalist who oversaw the creation of the UK's first medical school completely open to both male and female students.

== Career ==
Moonesinghe was appointed to UCL Hospitals in 2010 as consultant in anaesthetics and critical care medicine, and was appointed Professor of Perioperative Medicine at UCL in 2018. She is co-director of the UCL/UCLH Surgical Outcomes Research Centre (SOuRCe). She is director of the Centre for Perioperative Medicine and head of the Research Department for Targeted Intervention, both at UCL. Her research focuses on evaluating interventions aimed at improving perioperative outcomes, including technological and service innovations. Her work also develops and evaluates methods of predicting risk of adverse outcomes from major surgery and ways to measure outcome from surgery, including patient-centred outcomes. She has received research funding for epidemiological and interventional research from the Health Foundation, Wellcome Trust and the National Institute for Health Research (NIHR) amongst other funders.

Between 2008 and 2012, Moonesinghe was a council member of the Royal College of Anaesthetists. Between 2016 and 2022 she was director of the National Institute for Academic Anaesthesia's (NIAA) Health Services Research Centre. She was the NIAA academic training advisor between 2012 and 2017 and a NIAA Board member from 2009 until 2022.

In 2017, Moonesinghe was selected to join the Q initiative in the founding cohort, an initiative led by the Health Foundation to improve care quality for NHS patients. Moonesinghe was on the design team of 'Little Heroes' gowns, a 2017 BSc Product Design student's final year project; superhero-inspired hospital gowns with a detachable capes for children aged two to six.

In 2016 she was appointed Associate National Clinical Director for Elective Care at NHS England, and then National Specialty Advisor for Elective Care in 2019. In 2020 she was appointed as National Clinical Director for Critical and Perioperative Care at NHS England and NHS Improvement. In this role she supported the national NHS response to the COVID-19 pandemic in England.

She was made an Officer of the Order of the British Empire in the 2021 New Year's Honours List, for service to anaesthesia, perioperative and critical care medicine.
