= Royal Grammar School, High Wycombe =

The Royal Grammar School, High Wycombe

Location
- Amersham Road; High Wycombe, Buckinghamshire, HP13 6QT; England, United Kingdom; 51°38′28″N 0°44′20″W

Information
- Type: Selective Grammar School; Academy
- Motto: Latin: Schola Regia Grammatica
- Established: 1551; 475 years ago
- Specialists: Language; Maths and Computing
- Department for Education URN: 136484 Tables
- Ofsted: Reports
- Headmaster: Philip Wayne
- Staff: c. 100
- Gender: Boys
- Age: 11 to 19
- Enrolment: 1393
- Houses: St. James (red), Sandringham (orange), Windsor (yellow), Buckingham (green), Balmoral (blue), Kensington (indigo)
- Colours: White, San Marino ^{Approx.} (#4165B3)
- Alumni: Old Wycombiensians
- Website: rgshw.com

The Royal Grammar School, High Wycombe, is a selective boys' grammar school situated in High Wycombe, Buckinghamshire, England. As a state school, it does not charge fees for pupils to attend, but they must pass the 11 plus, an exam that some primary schools administer. In February 2011, the school became an Academy.

Established by Royal Charter in 1562 (originally established as a school in 1551), it is situated on Amersham Hill to the north of the town and has a capacity of about 1,370 boys aged between 11 and 19, open Monday to Friday from 8:00am to 3:30pm and later for co-curricular activities. The school has boarding facilities and was a DfES-designated Language College until 2010. From 2007 to 2010, it was also a Mathematics and ICT College. OFSTED gave it a Good ranking in its 2019 inspection.

== History ==
Originally established by the mayor and burgesses of the town in 1551, in the ecclesiastical premises previously acquired by Sir Edmund Peckham (c. 1495 – 1564) during the Dissolution of the Monasteries, the school received its Royal charter in 1562 (which still survives today at the school's current location). It was based in the buildings of the former Hospital of St John the Baptist in the town centre until 1883. After the old hospital was demolished, the school was moved to new buildings nearby for a short time, and was moved to its current location in 1915.

The school expanded greatly under the headmastership of Edmund Tucker from 1933 to 1964, celebrating the 400th anniversary of its Royal Charter in 1962 with a visit from Queen Elizabeth II. To commemorate the visit, the school's main hall became Queen's Hall and bore an engraving to mark the occasion. In 1997 a new building was erected (the Language Block) entirely dedicated to the teaching of languages, which was opened by the Duchess of Gloucester.

There are several Royal Grammar School sites in the UK, of which High Wycombe, Colchester, Clitheroe and Lancaster have maintained their grammar school status, whilst Guildford, Newcastle upon Tyne and Worcester are now privately funded, private schools.

In 2006, tabloid accusations against then-headmaster Timothy Dingle led to an independent investigation. The school's governors concluded that he should be dismissed for "gross misconduct", but he had already resigned to take the position of head at a private school in Argentina. Dingle did not take up the position.

In 2016, the school made headlines after a question set in a practice maths test by a volunteer (a retired teacher) was deemed homophobic after it stated "marriage is between one man and one woman, as God intended when he made humans male and female". The school immediately withdrew the practice test when informed of the question by students. Headmaster Philip Wayne apologised "on behalf of the whole school community of governors, staff and boys" and said the volunteer who set the question would not be returning.

== Headmaster ==
The current headmaster is Philip Wayne, who was Headmaster of Chesham Grammar School for eight years before joining RGSHW. He succeeded Roy Page in September 2015. Previous notable headmasters include Rowland Brown OBE (1975 - 1993).

== Entry ==
In order to gain entry to the school, pupils from primary schools in the local area are invited to do an entrance exam, the eleven-plus exam. RGS admits around 200 day boys each year and 10-15 boarding boys. Prospective boys who did not take the 11+ (e.g. those who join in later years or those who come from different counties or countries not taking the 11+) also take the school's own entry tests, consisting of a test in both their Mathematics and English subject abilities.

== Boarding ==
Though primarily a day school, some pupils have boarded at the school since the 1800s. For most of the 20th century, boarders were lodged in one of three boarding houses: School House, a purpose-built residence on the school premises, and Uplyme and Tyler's Wood, two converted private houses located near the school. In September 1999 the entire boarding facility was consolidated into the newly built Fraser Youens Boarding House. It incorporates en-suite bedrooms, communication technology, three resident Housemasters and a committee of House Tutors. It has room for 70 resident boys, who stay throughout the week and return home for weekends. The house is named after alumni Ian Edward Fraser and Frederick Youens, who were awarded the Victoria Cross during the Second World War and First World War respectively.

== Sixth form ==
RGS has a sixth form. Boys (and girls as of 2025) from other schools can join the sixth form but need to have achieved eight GCSEs at grades 5–9 with a grade 6 or above in seven of those (including mathematics and English). Since September 2025, Girls can join the sixth form.

=== Available subjects ===
The following subjects are available for A Levels:

- Ancient History
- Art and Design
- Biology
- Business Studies
- Chemistry
- Computer Science
- Design and Technology
- Drama
- Economics
- English Literature
- French
- Geography
- German
- History
- Latin
- Mathematics
- Further Mathematics (may only be taken with Mathematics)
- Music
- Philosophy
- Physics
- Politics
- Psychology
- Spanish
- Sport BTEC

== Facilities ==
A music centre was opened in late 2004, so that the school can offer A Level Music Technology.

There is an on-site Combined Cadet Force. Other activities include the Public Speaking Society, music and orchestras, drama, social service, fencing and other sports. The school has two playing fields. The RGS also has its own .22 25 yard indoor range which is used by the shooting team of the school.

In 2013, planning permission for an All Weather Pitch was granted, and in 2014, work began raising £1m to fund the creation of this 3G floodlit pitch, a new grass pitch, which was completed in April 2016, and to renovate the 100-year-old Main Block classrooms.

The school also has a heated indoor 25m swimming pool.

== Activities ==
=== Stage Lighting and Sound Team ===

In 2019 the Stage Lighting and Sound Team (SLST) could be joined by some boys at or after, Academic Year 9.

=== Combined Cadet Force ===
The Combined Cadet Force has an Army section and an RAF section open for boys in KS4 & 5 (Years 10 and above) where they learn skills such as field-craft, map and compass, drill, leadership and first aid, while also taking part in activities such as weapon handling and flying.

=== Music ===
Senior groups have featured at the National Festival of Music for Youth having been the National Youth Choir of the Year in 2014.

=== Gilbert and Sullivan operas ===
In 1947 Bernarr Rainbow directed the first of the Gilbert and Sullivan Savoy operas to be performed at the school. These continued until at least 1976.

=== Sport ===
Its alumni founded the town's local rugby club High Wycombe RFC, originally known as Old Wycombiensians FC. Sporting alumni include golfer Luke Donald, 2003 Rugby World Cup winner Matt Dawson, 1993 Rugby World Cup Sevens winner Nick Beal., 400 metres hurdles athlete Martin Gillingham, England Hockey Captain Jon Wyatt, and the cricketers Phil Newport and Saif Zaib.

=== Rowing ===
The school has an active rowing club called the Royal Grammar School High Wycombe Boat Club which is based on the River Thames at the Longridge Activity Centre, Quarry Wood Road. The club is affiliated to British Rowing (Boat code HWG) and produced two junior national champion crews at the 2014 British Rowing Junior Championships.

== Notable alumni and teachers ==
Alumni of the RGS are known as Old Wycombiensians, or OWs, and include Chris Grayling, former UK Secretary of State for Transport, the singers Ian Dury and Howard Jones, the comedian Jimmy Carr and the philosopher Roger Scruton. The Old Wycombiensians' Committee hosts an annual reunion dinner for Old Wycombiensians at the RGS. Notable sporting alumni include former England rugby union player Matt Dawson, Ryder-Cup winning captain golfer Luke Donald and sprinter Martin Gillingham.

T. S. Eliot taught for a term at the school in the autumn of 1915.

== Popular culture ==
- On 1 May 2009 BBC TV show Top Gear recorded at the school. They filmed in the Quadrangle (teacher's car park) against the old main building and clock tower for a segment where Jeremy Clarkson, Richard Hammond and James May were undertaking the challenge, Finding the perfect car for 17-year-olds. The episode was aired in June 2009.
- In 2011 the corridors of the same building appeared in the opening and closing scenes of the BBC Documentary series, Our War.

== See also ==
- List of English and Welsh endowed schools (19th century)
