= Philip James (nutritionist) =

British professor

William Philip Trehearne James (June 27, 1938 – October 5, 2023) was a British professor.

== Early life and education ==
James was born in Liverpool, England in 1938, but grew up in Bala, Snowdonia, Wales. His family members were Quakers.

James attended Ackworth School and later studied medicine at UCL Medical School.

== Career ==
In 1965, James was sent by the Medical Research Council to study malnutrition in Jamaica, where he developed treatments for children with severe malnutrition and diarrhoea. He later became director of the Rowett Institute in 1982, a leading nutrition research institute, and worked on projects for the World Health Organization (WHO).

In the early 1980s, James co-authored a report by the National Advisory Committee on Nutrition Education, which provided recommendations on reducing fat, sugar, and salt intake in the British diet.

In 1995, James founded the International Obesity Task Force (IOTF) and organized the first WHO global burden analysis of obesity, highlighting the substantial disease burden associated with high Body mass index. He also established the International Association for the Study of Obesity (now the World Obesity Federation), serving as its president from 2007 to 2014.

== Awards and recognition ==
James was elected to Fellowship of the Royal Society of Edinburgh in 1986 and appointed Commander of the Order of the British Empire (CBE) in 1993.

William Philip T James Award is named after him.

== Personal life ==
James was married to Jean Moorhouse from 1961 until his death, and they had two children.
