= Lister Hospital, Stevenage =

Lister Hospital
- East and North Hertfordshire Teaching NHS Trust
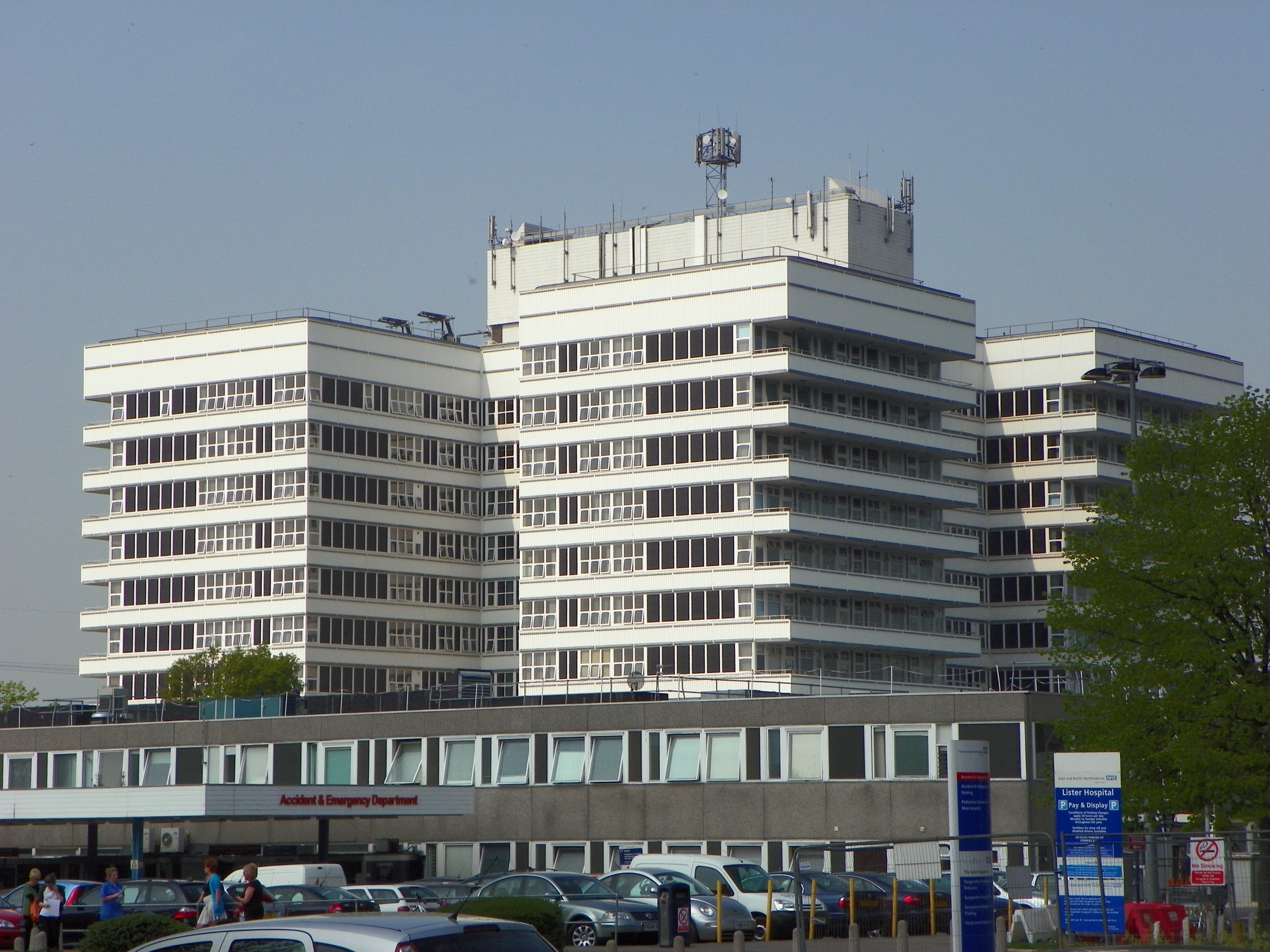
- Lister Hospital in 2011

- Shown in Hertfordshire

Geography
- Location: Stevenage, Hertfordshire, England
- Coordinates: 51°55′27″N 0°12′46″W

Organisation
- Care system: NHS England
- Type: District General
- Affiliated university: University of Hertfordshire

Services
- Emergency department: Yes
- Beds: 720

Links
- Website: www.enherts-tr.nhs.uk/our-hospitals/lister
- Lists: Hospitals in England

The Lister Hospital is an NHS hospital based on the outskirts of Stevenage in Hertfordshire. It is operated by the East and North Hertfordshire Teaching NHS Trust along with the New QEII Hospital in Welwyn Garden City.

== History ==
The Lister Hospital evolved from the workhouse in Hitchin. The Hitchin Union Workhouse had been built in 1836 on Oughtonhead Way in Hitchin. The workhouse system was brought to an end in 1930. Workhouses had provided a degree of healthcare for the poor alongside their other functions, and healthcare uses often became the main function of the former workhouse premises after 1930, including at Hitchin. The old Hitchin workhouse became the Hitchin Public Assistance Institution, run by Hertfordshire County Council. It was renamed the Lister Hospital in 1943, after Joseph Lister (1827—1912), a pioneer of aseptic surgery, who had been to school in Hitchin. The hospital was taken over by the NHS on its creation in 1948.

The hospital relocated from Hitchin to its current site on the northern edge of Stevenage in 1972. The new premises were opened by Queen Elizabeth The Queen Mother.

With an investment of around £150 million, the Lister hospital was transformed in October 2014.

== Operations ==
The Lister Hospital currently has 730 beds and is a general hospital, which includes accident and emergency, urology and renal dialysis units.

== See also ==
- List of hospitals in England
