= Hertford County Hospital =

- East and North Hertfordshire Teaching NHS Trust
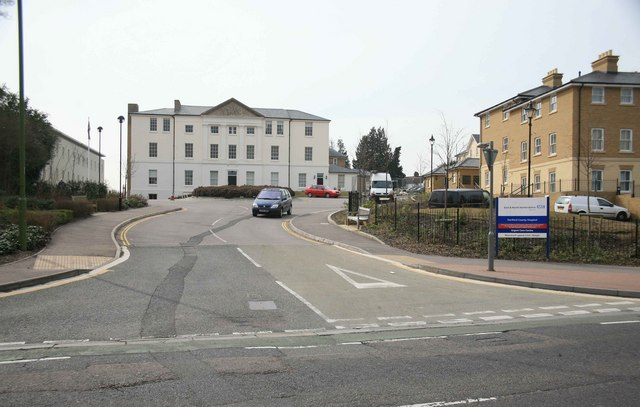
- Hertford County Hospital

- Shown in Hertfordshire

Geography
- Location: Hertford, England
- Coordinates: 51°47′47″N 0°05′19″W

Organisation
- Care system: NHS
- Type: General

History
- Founded: 1822; 204 years ago

Links
- Website: www.enherts-tr.nhs.uk/our-hospitals/hertford-county/

Hertford County Hospital is situated in the town of Hertford, county town of Hertfordshire, England. It is managed by the East and North Hertfordshire Teaching NHS Trust.

== History ==
The origins of the hospital lie in the General Dispensary which was established in one room of Hertford Castle 'for the relief of the sick poor by affording them gratuitous advice and medicine' with permission from the Marquess of Salisbury, Lord-Lieutenant of Hertfordshire, in 1822. The foundation stone of a new purpose-built hospital was laid by the John Kaye, Bishop of Lincoln on 17 July 1832 and the General Infirmary, as it became known, opened to in-patients on 3 July 1833. Beer was brewed and served at the hospital until 1834. In the late 19th century the hospital was supported by funds from local people including Earl Cowper. The facility became Hertford County Hospital in 1908 and, following a substantial reconstruction of the building that took place in 1916, it joined the National Health Service in 1948.

A further re-development of the site, which cost of £8.5 million, took place in 2003; the scheme, which involved the construction of new facilities and the release of the older buildings for residential use, was completed in November 2004.
