= Michael Brown (physician) =

British physician

- Born: 17 January 1931; Ramsgate
- Died: 13 June 1993 (aged 62); Woolwich
- Scientific career
- Fields: Medicine
- Workplaces: University College Hospital, Royal College of Physicians, Royal Army Medical College

Major General Michael Brown FRCPE FRCP (1931–1993) was a senior British physician, Director of Army Medicine and Physician to the Queen.

== Biography ==
Born in Ramsgate, Kent, on 17 January 1931, Michael Brown was educated at Bedford School and at University College London Medical School. He became a regular British Army officer in 1956 and was Consultant Physician at the Royal Army Medical College between 1966 and 1981. He was posted to military hospitals in Hong Kong, Nepal and Malaysia, where he co-authored a major paper on melioidosis. He was elected to the Fellowship of the Royal College of Physicians in 1976 and appointed as Professor of Military Medicine at the Royal College of Physicians and at the Royal Army Medical College between 1981 and 1985. He was Consultant Physician to the British Army of the Rhine between 1985 and 1988, Director of Army Medicine and Physician to the Queen between 1988 and 1990, and a Fellow of University College London between 1991 and 1993.

Major General Michael Brown died in Woolwich on 13 June 1993.
