= Randle cycle =

Defensive mechanism of cells against glycation

The Randle cycle, also known as the glucose fatty-acid cycle, is a metabolic process involving the cross inhibition of glucose and fatty acids for substrates. It is theorized to play a role in explaining type 2 diabetes and insulin resistance.

It was named for Philip Randle, who described it in 1963.

== Cycle ==
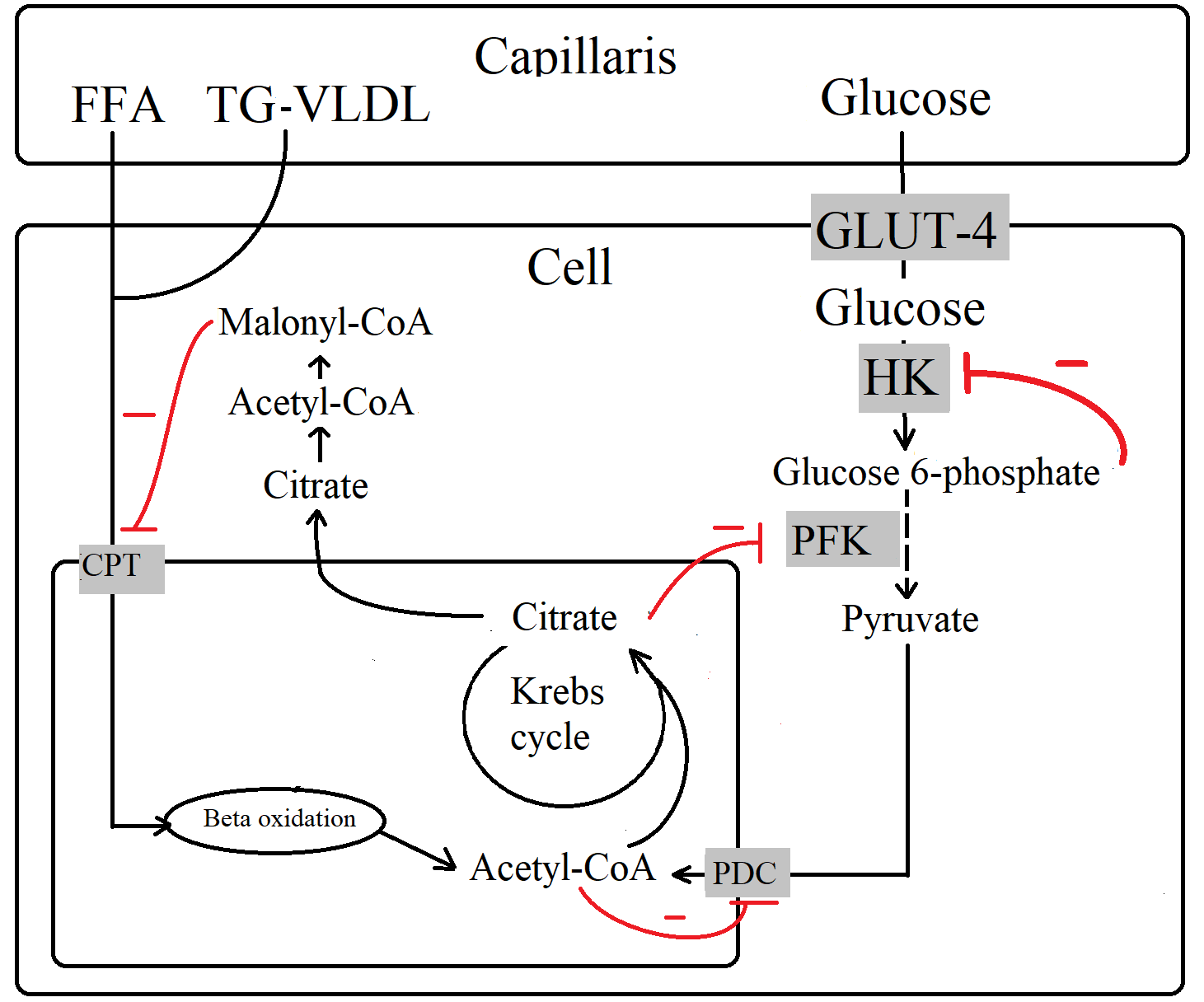
Randle cycle

The Randle cycle is a biochemical mechanism involving the mutual inhibition of glucose and fatty acids in their oxidation and uptake in muscle and adipose tissue. The cycle controls fuel selection and adapts the substrate supply and demand in normal tissues. This cycle adds a nutrient-mediated fine tuning on top of the more coarse hormonal control on fuel metabolism. This adaptation to nutrient availability applies to the interaction between adipose tissue and muscle. Hormones that control adipose tissue lipolysis affect circulating concentrations of fatty acids; these in turn control the fuel selection in muscle. Mechanisms involved in the Randle Cycle include allosteric control, reversible phosphorylation and the expression of key enzymes. The energy balance from meals composed of differing macronutrient composition is identical, but the glucose and fat balances that contribute to the overall energy balance change reciprocally with meal composition.

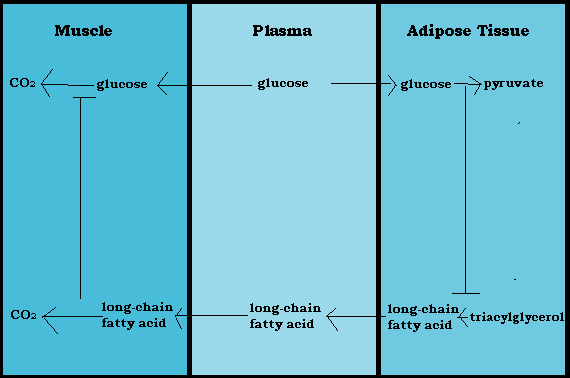
Overview of the Randle Cycle.

== Glucose is spared and rerouted ==
=== Fasted state ===
When fasting, the activation of lipolysis provides fatty acids as the preferred fuel source for respiration. In the liver β-oxidation of fatty acids fulfills the local energy needs and may lead to ketogenesis (creating ketone bodies out of fatty acids.) The ketone bodies are then used to meet the demands of tissues other than the liver. This inhibition of glucose oxidation at the level of pyruvate dehydrogenase preserves pyruvate and lactate, both of which are gluconeogenic precursors.

=== Fed state ===
The glucose fatty acid cycle is also observed in the fed state after a high-fat meal or during exercise. This is when plasma concentrations of fatty acids or ketone bodies are increased. The glucose that is not oxidized is then rerouted to glycogen. This rerouting to glycogen explains the rapid resynthesis of muscle glycogen after exercise as well as the increased glycogen content in muscles found in starvation or diabetes. This mechanism replenishes the intermediates of the citric acid cycle.

== Inhibition of glycolytic pathway ==
The impairment of glucose metabolism by fatty acid oxidation is mediated by the short-term inhibition of several glycolytic processes. The extent of inhibition increases along the glycolytic pathway, being most severe at the level of pyruvate dehydrogenase and less severe at the level of glucose uptake and 6-phosphofructo-1-kinase (PFK-1). This sequence occurs because of the initial event, triggered by fatty acid oxidation, is an increase in the mitochondrial ratios of [acetyl-CoA]/[CoA] and [NADH]/[NAD+]. These both serve to inhibit pyruvate dehydrogenase activity. It has been proposed that these changes lead to an accumulation of cytosolic citrate, which in turn inhibits PFK-1, followed by an increase in glucose 6-phosphate, which eventually inhibits hexokinase.

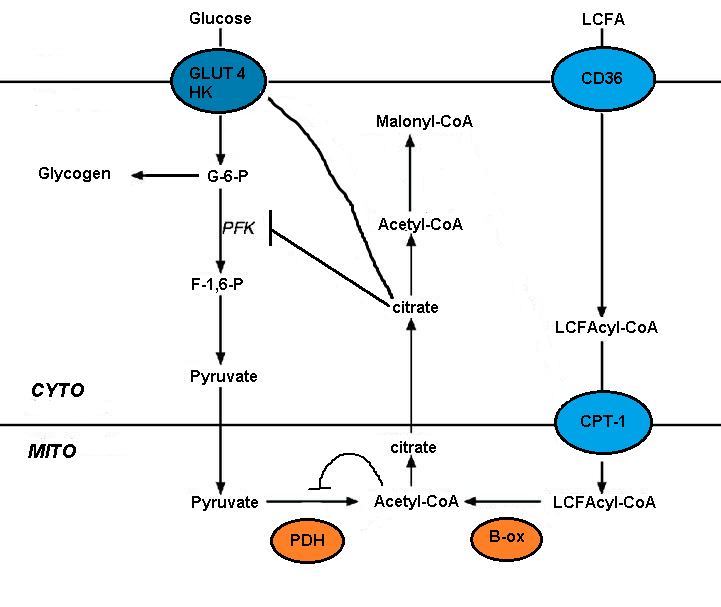

== Hemodynamic stress ==
Hemodynamic stress overrides fatty acid inhibition of glucose metabolism. During this time there is a decrease in substrate supply and an increase in the substrate demand. This leads to an activation of AMP-activated protein kinase (AMPK) as the AMP concentration rises in intracellular fluids and the ATP concentration decreases. The stress-induced activation of AMPK provides an immediate metabolic adaption and protects the heart from ischemic stress.

== Fatty acid oxidation inhibition by malonyl-CoA ==
Malonyl-CoA signals glucose utilization and it controls the entry and oxidation of long-chain fatty acids (LCFA) in the mitochondria. Circulating glucose in the liver stimulates its uptake. Glucose oxidation produces citrate which can be converted to malonyl-CoA by acetyl-CoA carboxylase. Malonyl-CoA inhibits the carnitine palmitoyltransferase (CPT) that controls the entry and oxidation of LCFA. The glucose-derived malonyl-CoA prevents the oxidation of fatty acids and favors fatty acid esterification.

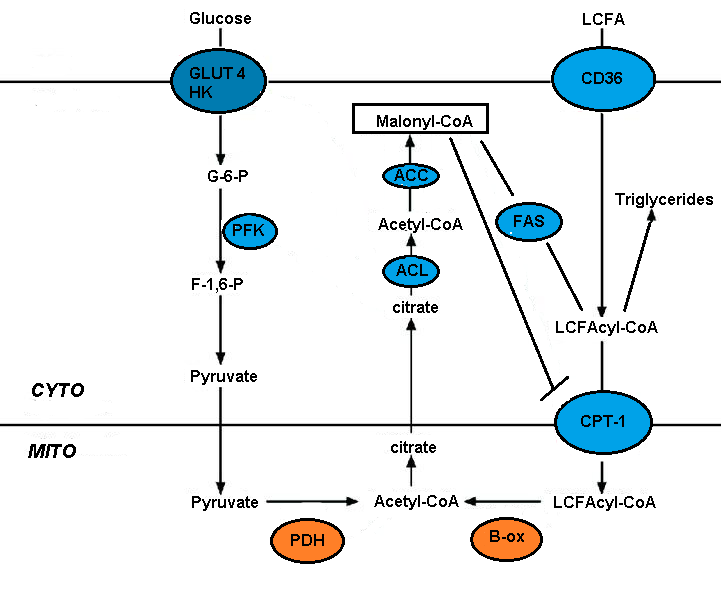

== Cytosolic events controlling fatty acid oxidation ==
=== Malonyl-CoA concentration ===
The concentration of malonyl-CoA depends on the balance between acetyl-CoA carboxylase (ACC) and malonyl-CoA decarboxylase (MCD). AMP-activated protein kinase (AMPK) is reported to phosphorylate and inactivate liver ACC. This in turn decreases malonyl-CoA concentrations which stimulates fatty acid oxidation and ketogenesis by glucagon in the liver. AMPK phosphorylates and inactivates ACC in the liver and other tissues.

=== Integration of AMPK and ACC in the glucose-fatty acid cycle ===
Inhibition of fatty acid oxidation requires that ACC is active. Both AMPK and MCD are inactive and glucose uptake is stimulated. The LCFAs are then rerouted to esterification. These conditions exist in tissues rich in oxygen, in which AMPK is inactive and glucose inactivates the AMPK (researched in skeletal muscle).

The inhibition of MCD suppresses the oxidation of fatty acids and stimulates glucose oxidation. In a study on MCD deficient mice there was no difference in the oxidation of fatty acids and glucose in the heart under aerobic conditions. It is theorized that the overexpression of fatty acids being used makes up for the lack of MCD.

=== Fatty acid uptake ===
Long chain fatty acid uptake is mediated by several transporters, including FAT (fatty acid translocase)/CD36. CD36 deletion rescues lipotoxic cardiomyopathy. FAT/CD36 may be controlled by insulin and AMPK. Increased transport coupled to the formation of the CoA derivatives and the resulting AMPK activation should ensure efficient fatty acid uptake and metabolism.

== Mitochondrial events controlling fuel selection ==
Fatty acids are preferentially oxidized because of the inactivation of PDH by fatty acid oxidation inhibiting glucose oxidation. This suggests that mitochondrial metabolism may control fuel selection. Cellular respiration is stimulated by fatty acids and this relates to an increase in the mitochondrial NADH to NAD+ ratio, suggesting that energy provision overtakes energy consumption. Switching from glucose to fatty acid oxidation leads to a bigger proportion of electrons being transported to complex 2 rather than complex 1 of the respiratory chain. This difference leads to a less efficient oxidative phosphorylation. By oxidizing fatty acids, mitochondria increase their respiration while increasing the production of ROS.

== Fatty acids and insulin ==
Fatty acids may act directly upon the pancreatic β-cell to regulate glucose-stimulated insulin secretion. This effect is biphasic. Initially fatty acids potentiate the effects of glucose. After prolonged exposure to high fatty acid concentrations this changes to an inhibition. Randle suggested that the term fatty acid syndrome would be appropriate to apply to the biochemical syndrome resulting from the high concentration of fatty acids and the relationship to abnormalities of carbohydrate metabolism, including starvation, diabetes and Cushing’s syndrome.
