= Peace Hospice =

The Peace Hospice
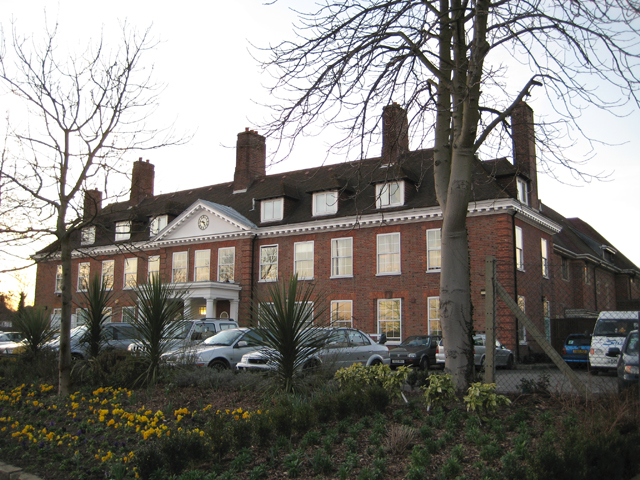
- The Peace Hospice

- Shown in Hertfordshire

Geography
- Location: Watford, Hertfordshire, United Kingdom
- Coordinates: 51.6588°N 0.4048°W

Organisation
- Care system: Private
- Type: Specialist

Services
- Speciality: Care for the elderly

History
- Founded: 1996

Links
- Website: www.peacehospicecare.org.uk
- Lists: Hospitals in the United Kingdom

The Peace Hospice is a health facility caring for people with a life-limiting or terminal illness, which is funded by public donations, situated on Rickmansworth Road, Watford, Hertfordshire. It is a locally listed building.

== History ==
The facility has its origins in the Watford and District Peace Memorial Hospital which was commissioned to commemorate the lives of local people who died in the First World War. The foundation stone was laid by the Countess of Clarendon in July 1923. The building was designed by Wallace Marchment in the Neo-Classical style and was opened by Princess Mary in June 1925. The Watford Peace Memorial was erected outside the hospital in 1928. It joined the National Health Service as the Watford Peace Memorial Hospital in 1948 and became the Peace Memorial Wing of Watford General Hospital in 1965. After services transferred to Watford General Hospital Peace Memorial Wing closed in 1985.

Following the refurbishment of the main administration block of the old hospital, a project funded by public donations, the facility was officially reopened as the Peace Hospice by Princess Michael of Kent in 1996. A new inpatient unit was completed in 2000.

In 2010 the Hardcore punk band Gallows, whose performers come from Watford and Hemel Hempstead, put on a performance at the Watford Colosseum which raised funds for the Peace Hospice.
