= Watford General Hospital =

- West Hertfordshire Teaching Hospitals NHS Trust
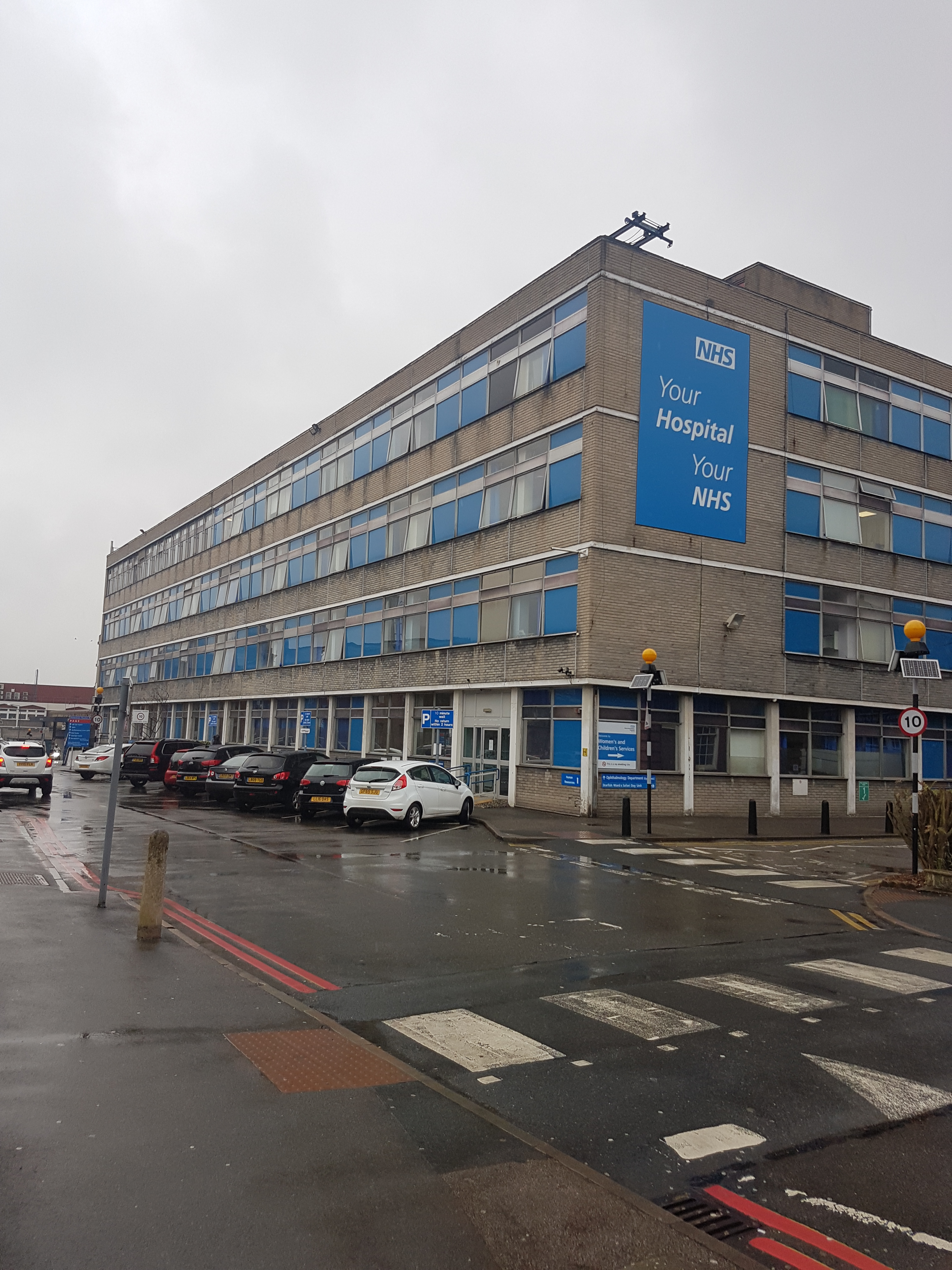
- Watford General Hospital from Vicarage Road

- Shown in Hertfordshire

Geography
- Location: Vicarage Road, Watford, Hertfordshire, England
- Coordinates: 51°38′54″N 0°24′14″W

Organisation
- Care system: National Health Service
- Type: District General

Services
- Emergency department: Yes
- Beds: 521

History
- Founded: 1948

Links
- Website: www.westhertshospitals.nhs.uk/about/watfordgeneralhospital.asp

Watford General Hospital is a 521-bed acute District General Hospital situated on Vicarage Road, Watford, Hertfordshire. Together with Hemel Hempstead Hospital and St Albans City Hospital, it is operated by West Hertfordshire Teaching Hospitals NHS Trust.

== History ==
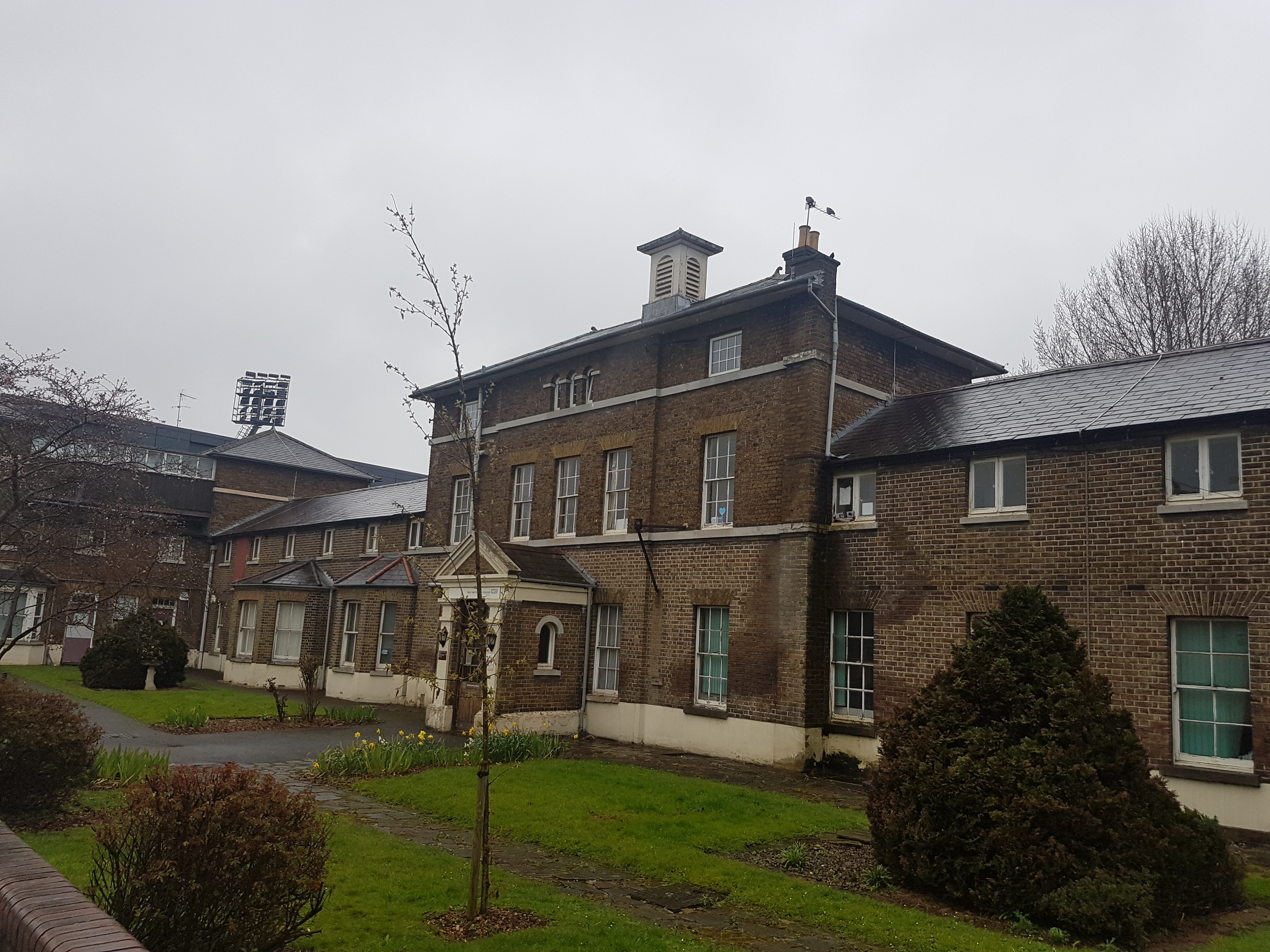
The Administration Block

Watford General was formed at the foundation of the National Health Service utilising buildings which were formerly the Watford workhouse and, from 1929, Shrodells Public Assistance Institution. The facility also incorporated the Peace Memorial Wing from 1965 when management of the Peace Memorial Hospital was transferred to the Shrodells site. The Peace Hospice is situated on the former Peace Memorial site. The Princess Michael of Kent Wing at the Shrodells site was opened by Princess Michael of Kent in 1986 and an acute admissions unit was opened by Andy Burnham, the Secretary of State for Health, in February 2010.

The hospital manages beyond its safe capacity with A&E having been designed for around 30,000 attendances per year but receiving over 88,000. The hospital was designated "inadequate" in its 2015 CQC inspection, but was upgraded to "requires improvement" in January 2018.

Outline planning permission to redevelop the hospital and create the Watford Health Campus was granted in 2008. Section 106 agreements which will provide £3 million for infrastructure around the Vicarage Road site, including education and transport, were signed on 26 March 2010. In August 2012 Kier Property was selected to carry out the development programme. It will take 15–20 years to complete.

== Facilities ==
A new road has been built to improve linking the hospital to the town centre and the M1. Given the name, Thomas Sawyer Way, it is the main access for the hospital.

The hospital is well-served by Watford buses running between the town centre and Rickmansworth.
