= Hertfordshire Partnership University NHS Foundation Trust =

- Type: Mental health NHS trust
- Established: 23 March 2000
- Chair: Sarah Betteley
- Chief executive: Karen Taylor
- Website: www.hpft.nhs.uk

Hertfordshire Partnership University NHS Foundation Trust provides mental health and learning difficulty services in Hertfordshire, England and neighbouring areas. It was granted University Trust Status in January 2013.

It took part in a project sponsored by the Kings Fund entitled Enhancing the Healing Environment in 2010 to enhance Elizabeth Court, Gravely Road, Stevenage for the benefit of patients with dementia.

In 2012 the Trust set up Let's Talk Grounds Maintenance new social enterprise partnership with Herts Mind Network which will train service users to deliver grounds maintenance services across South East Hertfordshire, including some of the trust's own sites.

In November 2013 it was revealed that the psychiatric unit at Welwyn Garden City's QE2 Hospital has lost 10 beds since April, despite being stretched to capacity, and 36 beds had been closed since April 2013. The Trust said "A new £42 million state-of-the-art 86-bed inpatient unit will open early next year at Harperbury near Radlett to replace our old wards on the general acute hospital sites".

The trust uses HealthRoster software, installed in October 2007, to manage staffing of 160 different areas of nursing. The manager says it is much more efficient than their previous paper-based system, especially as it could keep a record of requests.

== See also ==
- Healthcare in Hertfordshire
- List of NHS trusts
