= Rowland Brown (educator) =

British educator

Rowland Percival Brown OBE
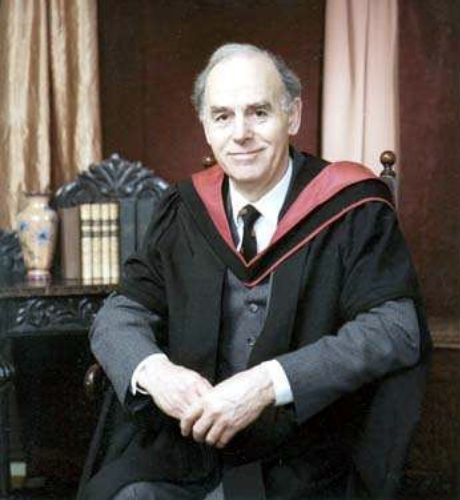
- Born: Rowland Percival Brown; 8 January 1933; Basingstoke, England
- Died: 22 September 2010 (aged 77); High Wycombe, Buckinghamshire, England
- Education: Worcester College, Oxford; University of Cambridge
- Occupations: Headmaster, Barrister at Law
- Known for: Headmaster of Royal Grammar School, High Wycombe
- Notable work: Head’s Legal Guide (1984), School Management Handbook (1992)
- Spouse: Jay Brown
- Children: 3 daughters
- Awards: Officer of the Order of the British Empire (1993)

Rowland Percival Brown OBE (8 January 1933 – 22 September 2010) was a British educator, best known for his tenure as Headmaster of the Royal Grammar School, High Wycombe, Buckinghamshire, from 1975 to 1993. He was appointed an Officer of the Order of the British Empire (OBE) in 1993 for services to education.

== Early life and education ==
Brown attended Queen Mary's School for Boys, Basingstoke, where he excelled in athletics, setting a long jump record and playing soccer. He won a state scholarship to Worcester College, Oxford, reading French and rowing for his college. During National Service, he was commissioned into the Intelligence Corps and spent a year at the University of Cambridge studying Russian. He was called to the Bar by the Inner Temple in 1966.

== Career ==
=== Early teaching roles ===
Brown began his teaching career at Hampton Grammar School, where he taught Russian, led the army section of the Combined Cadet Force (CCF), and established the school’s boat club. He later became Head of Modern Languages at Tudor Grange Grammar School in Solihull, organizing international school trips. In 1967, Brown was appointed Headmaster of King Edward VI Grammar School in Nuneaton, later serving as Principal when the institution transitioned to a sixth-form college in 1974.

=== Royal Grammar School, High Wycombe ===
Brown became Headmaster of RGS High Wycombe in 1975. His tenure was marked by:

- Preservation of grammar status: Defending the school’s selective admissions policy amid national shifts toward comprehensive education.
- Academic modernisation: Expanding A-level offerings and improving examination results.
- Governance reforms: Guiding the school through transitions to Local Management of Schools (LMS) and grant-maintained status, securing financial independence.
- Extracurricular development: Revitalizing sports, CCF, and student leadership programs, and expanding boarding facilities.

He oversaw royal visits by the Duke of Gloucester and the Princess of Wales.

=== National educational contributions ===
Brown held leadership roles in national educational organisations, including:

- National President of the Secondary Heads’ Association (SHA) (1985–1986),
- Chairman of the Association of Principals of VI Form Colleges,
- Legal consultant and co-author of the Head’s Legal Guide (1984) and School Management Handbook (1992), which provided guidance on education legislation.

=== Community service ===
Brown served as a Justice of the Peace (JP) on the Wycombe bench, chairing the Youth Panel and advocating for juvenile welfare. He was President of High Wycombe Rotary Club in 1990, introducing the first Rotary tree-planting scheme in the country, and was a member of Rotary International since 1968.

== Family and personal life ==
Brown married Jay, a teacher at Piper’s Corner School in Great Kingshill. They have three daughters. He was active in religious and community life, leading Crusader groups in Strawberry Hill and Solihull, and serving as a trustee, deacon, and chairman of the foundation at Union Baptist Church in High Wycombe.

Brown died on 22 September 2010, at the age of 77.

== Honours ==
Brown was appointed Officer of the Order of the British Empire (OBE) in the 1993 New Year Honours for services to education.

== Publications ==
- Brown, R. P. (1984). Head’s Legal Guide. Secondary Heads’ Association.
- Brown, R. P. (1992). School Management Handbook. Secondary Heads’ Association.

== Legacy ==
Brown’s leadership at RGS is remembered for balancing tradition with innovation, ensuring academic excellence during educational reforms. His legal and policy work influenced national school governance practices.
