= Hemel Hempstead Hospital =

- West Hertfordshire Teaching Hospitals NHS Trust
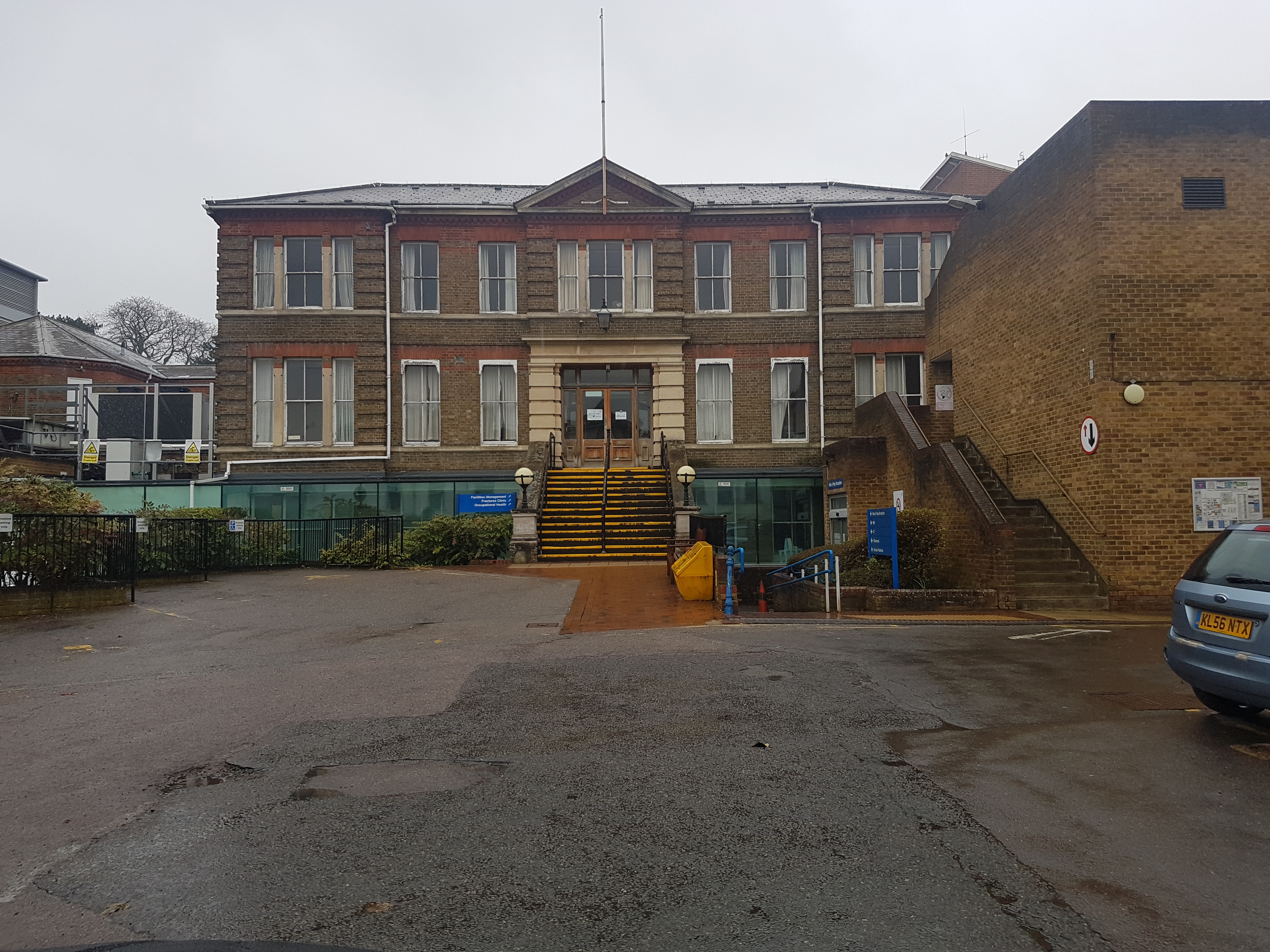
- Main block at Hemel Hempstead Hospital

- Shown in Hertfordshire

Geography
- Location: Hemel Hempstead, Hertfordshire, England
- Coordinates: 51.7508659°N 0.4707737°W

Organisation
- Care system: National Health Service

History
- Founded: 1832

Links
- Website: www.westhertshospitals.nhs.uk/about/hemelhempsteadhospital.asp

Hemel Hempstead Hospital is an acute District General Hospital in Hemel Hempstead, Hertfordshire operated by the West Hertfordshire Teaching Hospitals NHS Trust.

== History ==
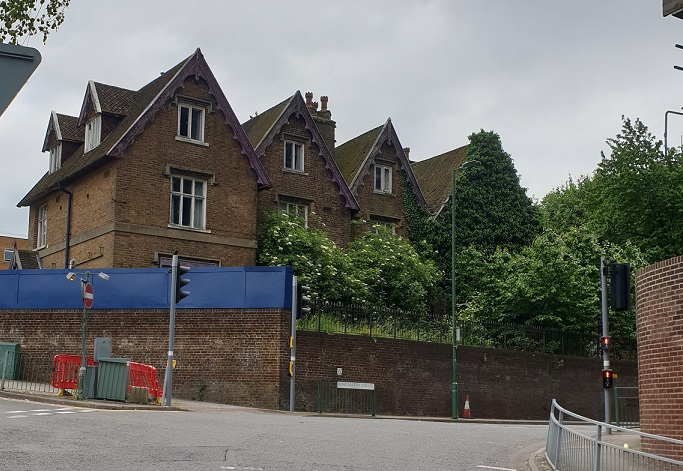
Cheere House, opened in 1832

The original hospital in Hemel Hempstead was established when Sir Astley Cooper converted a row of cottages at 130–136 Piccotts End to create an infirmary in 1827. The medical team moved to larger premises, acquired with funding from Sir John Sebright, 7th Baronet, at Cheere House at the bottom of Hillfield Road in 1832. The main block of the current hospital, then known as the West Hertfordshire Infirmary, was built further up Hillfield Road and was opened by Princess Mary of Teck in 1877. The hospital expanded to take military patients during the First World War.

The Marnham Maternity Wing, which was started in 1926 when a foundation stone was laid by the Prince of Wales just north of the main block, opened in 1929. A children's ward was added in 1939 and panels of picture tiles, made by Carter and Co. of Poole, depicting animals from Noah's Ark decorated the walls. The panels were refurbished and reinstalled in the children's ward in 1995. Another new block was opened by the Queen Mother in 1959.

The Verulam Wing, at the south-east end of the site, was added in 1992, the Jubilee Wing, just south of the main block, followed in 2002 and major enhancements consisting of an urgent care centre and a GP-led health centre were introduced within the Jubilee Wing in October 2008 and spring 2009 respectively.

== Services ==
Most departments are located in the Verulam Wing; however the urgent care centre and the health centre form part of the Jubilee Wing.

== Controversy ==
Large parts of the hospital site are currently mothballed and not actively used for healthcare provision, following the removal of the Accident & Emergency department in 2006. The West Hertfordshire Hospitals NHS Trust, which operates the site and two others in Watford and St Albans, has announced plans to redevelop its properties and relocate key services to Watford General Hospital, in effect further downgrading the status of the Hemel Hempstead Hospital. However, these plans have attracted criticism from local residents groups, such as the Dacorum Hospital Action Group, who favour a newly built hospital equidistant from the three major population centres and who have launched a judicial review of the Trust's plan.
