= Alison Leary =

British nurse and healthcare system modeler

Alison Leary MBE FRCN
- Education: St Thomas' Hospital; King's College London; University of London (PhD)
- Scientific career
- Workplaces: Millwall F.C. London South Bank University
- Thesis: Quality of life in patients receiving platinum based chemotherapy for advanced non-small cell lung cancer (2006)
- Website: www.lsbu.ac.uk/about-us/people/people-finder/prof-alison-leary

Alison Leary MBE FRCN is a Chair of Healthcare & Workforce Modelling at London South Bank University. and a Senior Consultant, World Health Organization Human Resources for Health Group where she works on the modelling of private and public healthcare systems. Leary is the deputy president of the Royal College of Nursing and a fellow of the Queen's Nursing Institute.

== Early life and education ==
Leary grew up in South East London where she lived on a council estate. She worked in engineering and biomedical sciences for ten years before studying a Diploma of Higher Education in adult nursing at St Thomas' Hospital. In 1996 she qualified as a registered nurse and later completed a master's degree in biomedical science (haematology). She completed a PhD in clinical medicine, with a focus on lung cancer, at the University of London in 2006. She has since completed an advanced study program in data science and leadership at the MIT Sloan School of Management in 2014.

== Research and career ==
Leary spent most of her clinical and analyst career in cancer, and worked with the National Cancer Action Team from 2005 to its dissolution in 2013 as part of the Lansley reforms. She was subsequently appointed a Chair in Healthcare and Workforce Modelling at the London South Bank University in 2014. She is interested in the complexity of healthcare and ways to use non-linear mathematics to model hospital staffing and outcomes. She has argued that the healthcare workforce should be evaluated based on outcomes, rather than outputs. This could be achieved through improving staff working conditions and pay, as well as streamlining immigration processes for shortage occupations. Leary believes that better planning could greatly improve the healthcare system, focussing on better understanding demand and risk. She has questioned the protection of the job title of nurse, emphasising that it is important to use it only for the highly trained specialists within the National Health Service. and led a successful campaign culminating in 2025 with the Secretary of State for Health announcing that the term "Nurse" would be protected in law in the UK .She has previously held the position of Chief Nursing Officer to St John Ambulance.

She has supported the idea of bringing more men into nursing to mitigate for the staff shortfall, but could exacerbate current equality issues within the nursing profession. Leary studied the gender pay gap in nursing, and found that male nurses reached higher paying posts more quickly and were overrepresented at higher pay grades. In 2016 she was awarded a Winston Churchill Memorial Trust Fellowship to study the use of big data in high reliability organisations. This position allowed her to compare healthcare with other safety critical industries in Switzerland and the United States of America.

Leary served as the clinical lead at Millwall Football Club. In this capacity she helped the football club deploy emergency healthcare, and studied what roles are required for the most effective response team. Her research on the effectiveness of medical teams is part of Millwall F.C.'s new approach to healthcare services, which can accommodate disasters as well as minor injuries, spectator safety and primary care. This work was included in the Sports Safety Ground Authority's 2018 guide, which sets benchmarking standards in British football grounds. She stood down after 23 years. She is a member of the TED Whitehall Women expert group.

She has served as non-executive director of several charities, including the National Lung Cancer Forum for Nurses, the Millwall Community Scheme. and the British Association of Immediate Care

Leary was elected as the deputy president of the Royal College of Nursing in 2024, taking office on 1 January 2025.

=== Awards and honours ===
- 2012 Mayor of Southwark Civic Award
- 2013 Florence Nightingale Foundation Leadership Scholar
- 2014 Nursing Times Leaders list
- 2014 Health Service Journal Inspirational Women
- 2015 Elected Fellow of the Royal College of Nursing
- 2016 Elected Fellow of the Queen's Nursing Institute
- 2018 Top 70 women in health in 70 years of the NHS
- 2019 Appointed an MBE in the 2019 Birthday Honours

=== Selected publications ===
Her publications include:

- Leary, Alison (2012). Lung Cancer: A Multidisciplinary Approach. Wiley-Blackwell. ISBN 9781405180757.
- Leary, Alison (2015). More Passion for Science: Journeys into the Unknown. Finding Ada.
