= Hertfordshire Community NHS Trust =

Healthcare trust in England

Hertfordshire Community NHS Trust, commonly referred to as HCT, is an NHS organisation providing adult and children's community health services, such as district nursing and health visiting, across Hertfordshire. It also provides some services in West Essex, in prisons and specialist care to a population of more than 1.1 million.

== History ==
The Trust was established on 1 November 2010 as part of the Transforming Community Services initiative by virtue of statutory instrument number 2010/2464 made under the National Health Service Act 2006. Prior to this it was the “provider services arm” of the then East & North Hertfordshire Primary Care Trust and West Hertfordshire Primary Care Trust.

== Principal activities ==
The trust had an income of £140m during 2014/15 and employed around 3,000 staff. Hertfordshire Community NHS Trust (HCT) is the principal provider of community-based healthcare to the 1.1m residents of Hertfordshire and, since April 2012, 68,000 children in West Essex.

The Trust provides community-based services for adults and older people, children and young people, and a range of specialist care services. It had around two million contacts with people during the course of the year and were dealing with people from before birth until death.

The Trust operates its services through three business units and the services they provide are set out in the Service Portfolio.

In January 2019 it lost a £44 million-a-year contract in west Hertfordshire to Central London Community Healthcare NHS Trust.

== Performance ==
In February 2015 the Care Quality Commission, the quality regulator of the NHS, conducted an inspection of the trust's services. The inspectors' report was published in July 2015. The CQC carried out a second inspection in 2016 and rated the trust as 'Good'.

It was named by the Health Service Journal as one of the top hundred NHS trusts to work for in 2015. At that time it had 2415 full-time equivalent staff and a sickness absence rate of 4.17%. 67% of staff recommend it as a place for treatment and 53% recommended it as a place to work.

== Board of directors ==
Since March 2012 David Law has held the role of Chief Executive of Hertfordshire Community NHS Trust.

== See also ==
- Healthcare in Hertfordshire
