= St Albans City Hospital =

- West Hertfordshire Teaching Hospitals NHS Trust
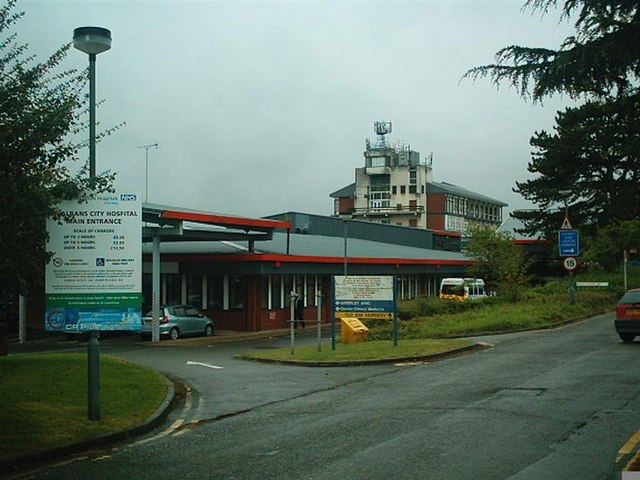
- St Albans City Hospital

- Shown in Hertfordshire

Geography
- Location: Waverley Road, St Albans, Hertfordshire, England
- Coordinates: 51.76125°N 0.34307°W

Organisation
- Care system: National Health Service

History
- Founded: 1838

Links
- Website: www.westhertshospitals.nhs.uk/about/stalbanscityhospital.asp

St Albans City Hospital is an acute District General Hospital in St Albans, Hertfordshire operated by the West Hertfordshire Teaching Hospitals NHS Trust.

== History ==
The hospital was established by St Albans Board of Guardians as a workhouse in 1838. It became known as the St Albans Public Assistance Institution in 1930, Osterhills Hospital in 1948 and the St Albans City Hospital in the 1950s. Two wards at the hospital closed in February 2017.

== Facilities ==
An Integrated Urgent Care Hub runs on site and treats urgent but not life-threatening health conditions. It offers appointments between 9 am and 6 pm, seven days a week and provides access to diagnostic services such as x-rays. Patients are booked into the service, often with same day appointments, through NHS 111 or their GP practice. It is not a walk-in service.
