= UCL Medical School =

Public medical school in London, England

Coordinates: 51.5218°N 0.1348°W

- Type: Medical school
- Established: 1746 (Middlesex Hospital Medical School); 1834 (University College Hospital Medical School); 1874 (London School of Medicine for Women, later The Royal Free Hospital School of Medicine); 1987 (University College and Middlesex School of Medicine); 1998 (Royal Free and University College Medical School); 2008 (UCL Medical School)
- Affiliations: University College London
- Dean: Mark Emberton
- Director: Faye Gishen
- Location: London, England
- Website: www.ucl.ac.uk/medical-school/

UCL Medical School is the medical school of University College London (UCL), a public research university in London, England. The school provides a wide range of undergraduate and postgraduate medical education programmes and also has a medical education research unit and an education consultancy unit.

UCL has offered education in medicine since 1834. The currently configured and titled medical school was established in 2008 following mergers between UCLH Medical School, the medical school of the Middlesex Hospital (in 1987), and the Royal Free Hospital Medical School (in 1998). The school's clinical teaching is primarily conducted at University College Hospital, the Royal Free Hospital, and the Whittington Hospital, with other associated teaching hospitals including the Great Ormond Street Hospital, Moorfields Eye Hospital, the National Hospital for Neurology and Neurosurgery and the Royal National Throat, Nose and Ear Hospital, Royal National Orthopaedic Hospital and Luton and Dunstable University Hospital.

== History ==
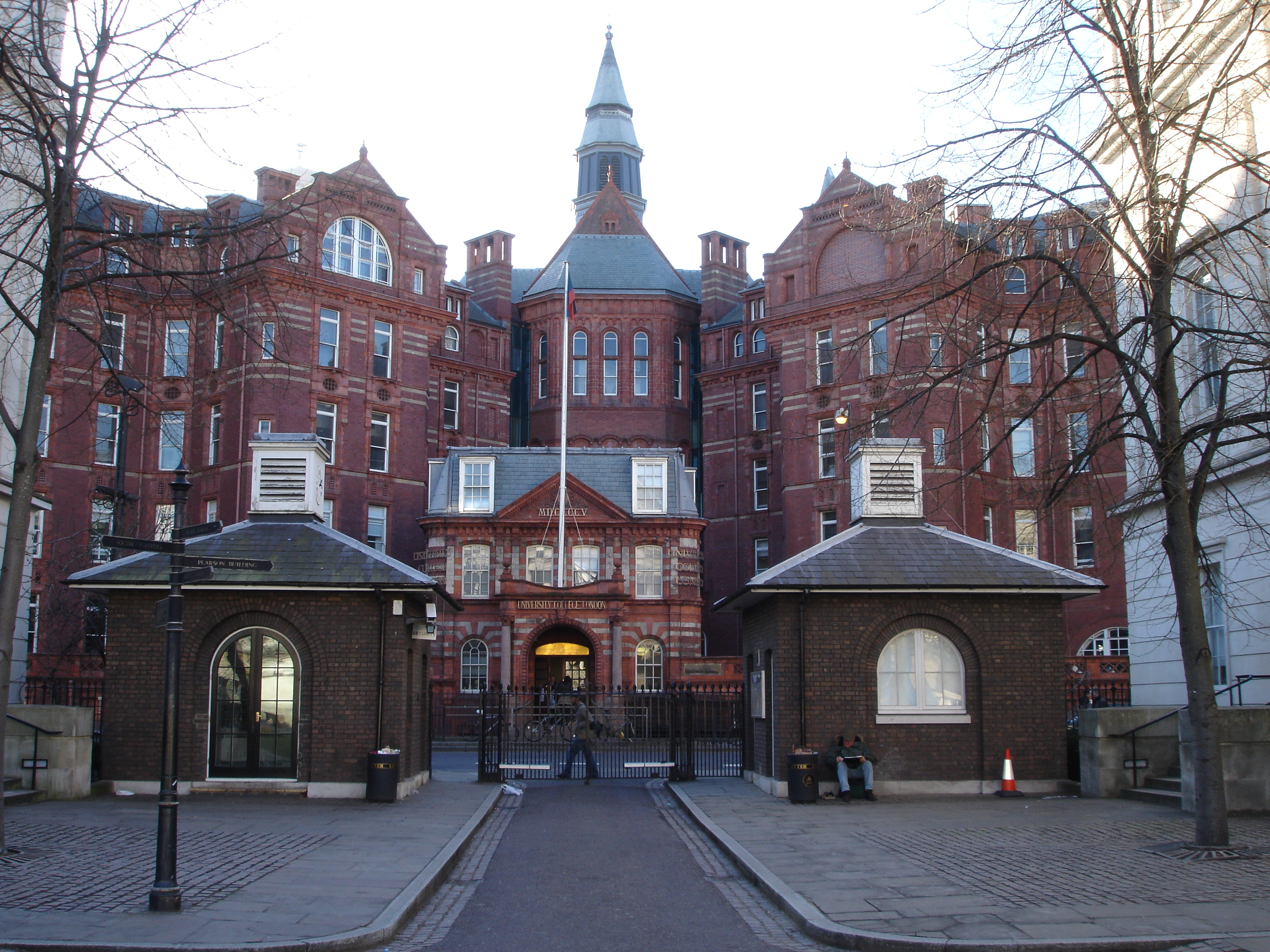
The Cruciform Building on Gower Street, which houses the preclinical facilities of the UCL Medical School; it was previously the main building of University College Hospital

UCL Medical School formed over a number of years from the merger of a number of institutions:

- The Middlesex Hospital opened in Fitzrovia in 1745 and was training doctors from 1746 onwards, when students were 'walking the wards'.
- University College Hospital opened in 1834 as the North London Hospital, with the purpose of providing the then newly opened University College London with a hospital to train medical students after refusal by the governors of the Middlesex Hospital to share its facilities with UCL.

Middlesex Hospital and University College Hospital merged their medical schools in 1987 to form University College & Middlesex School of Medicine (UCMSM).

- The London School of Medicine for Women was established in 1874 by Sophia Jex-Blake, as the first medical school in Britain to train women. In 1877 The Royal Free Hospital agreed to allow students from LSMW to complete their clinical studies there and by 1896 was renamed The London Royal Free Hospital School of Medicine for Women and became part of the University of London.

In 1998 The Royal Free & University College Medical School (RFUCMS) was formed from the merger of the two medical schools. On 1 October 2008, it was officially renamed UCL Medical School.

In appreciation of the historic beginnings of UCL Medical School, its student society has retained the name "RUMS" (Royal Free, University College and Middlesex Medical Students Society) and runs clubs and societies within University College London Union.

== Teaching ==
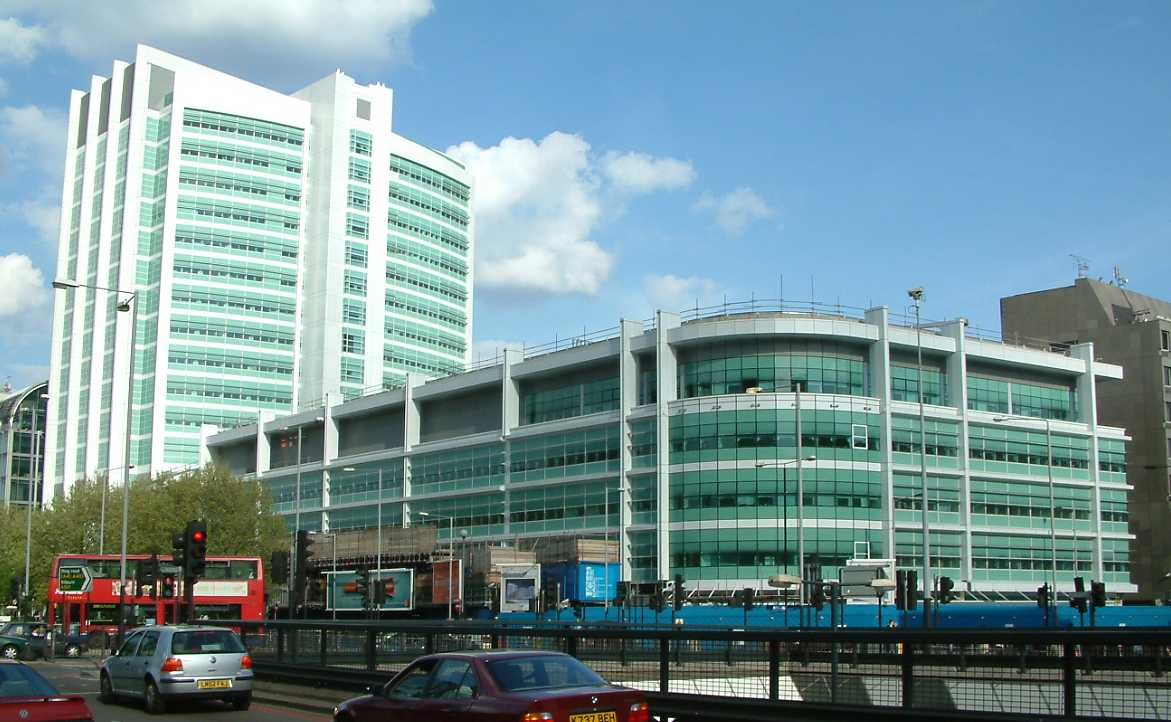
The current main building of University College Hospital on Euston Road, which opened in 2005

The medical school is one of the largest in the UK by student size, with a yearly intake of 334 students as of 2014. Undergraduate teaching is spread across three campuses based in Bloomsbury (University College Hospital), Archway (Whittington Hospital), and Hampstead (Royal Free Hospital).

Teaching takes place in: Great Ormond Street Hospital, The National Hospital for Neurology and Neurosurgery (Queen's Square), Moorfields Eye Hospital, The Heart Hospital, The Royal National Orthopaedic Hospital and the Royal National Throat, Nose and Ear Hospital.

The medical school is frequently ranked among top 5 in the UK and top 10 in the world.

=== Course ===
The medical course at UCL is a six-year integrated programme which leads to the awarding of MBBS and BSc (Hons) degrees. Years 1 and 2 Fundamentals of Clinical Science; Year 3 Integrated BSc degree; Year 4 Integrated Clinical Care; Year 5 The Life Cycle and Specialist Practice and Year 6 Preparation for Practice.

== Admission ==
Admission to the medical school, in common with all 44 medical schools in the UK, is extremely competitive. The medical school receives approximately 2,500 applications yearly (over 2700 for 2018 entry) of which up to 700 applicants are selected for interview. Approximately 450 offers are given for 322 places. Prospective students must apply through the Universities and Colleges Admissions Service (UCAS).

As of 2021 entry, conditional offers for entry include grades A*AA at A-level, to include at least Chemistry and Biology, and an additional subject at A-level. The International Baccalaureate (Full Diploma), although less common, is also an acceptable entry qualification. The course is also open to graduates with a minimum of a 2:1 required. Additionally, applicants must sit an entrance exam, the BioMedical Admissions Test (BMAT) which is used alongside the rest of the UCAS application to determine selection for interview. The interview process involves a 20-30 minute panel interview conducted by a panel of UCL academic staff, members of the healthcare team or medical students.

== Associated hospitals and research institutes ==
=== Hospitals ===
UCL Medical School is associated with the following hospitals:

- University College Hospital
- Royal Free Hospital
- Whittington Hospital
- Eastman Dental Hospital
- Great Ormond Street Hospital
- The Heart Hospital
- Moorfields Eye Hospital
- National Hospital for Neurology and Neurosurgery
- Royal National Throat, Nose and Ear Hospital
- Royal National Orthopaedic Hospital
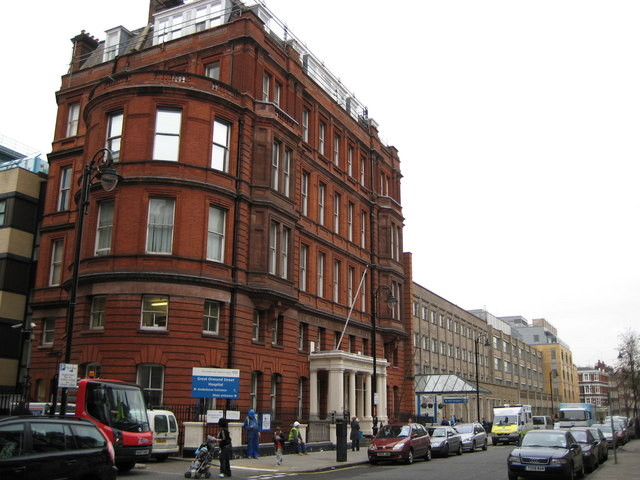
Great Ormond Street Hospital

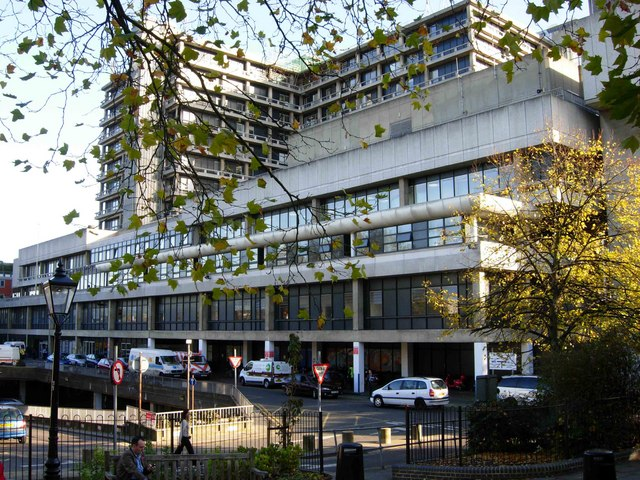
Royal Free Hospital

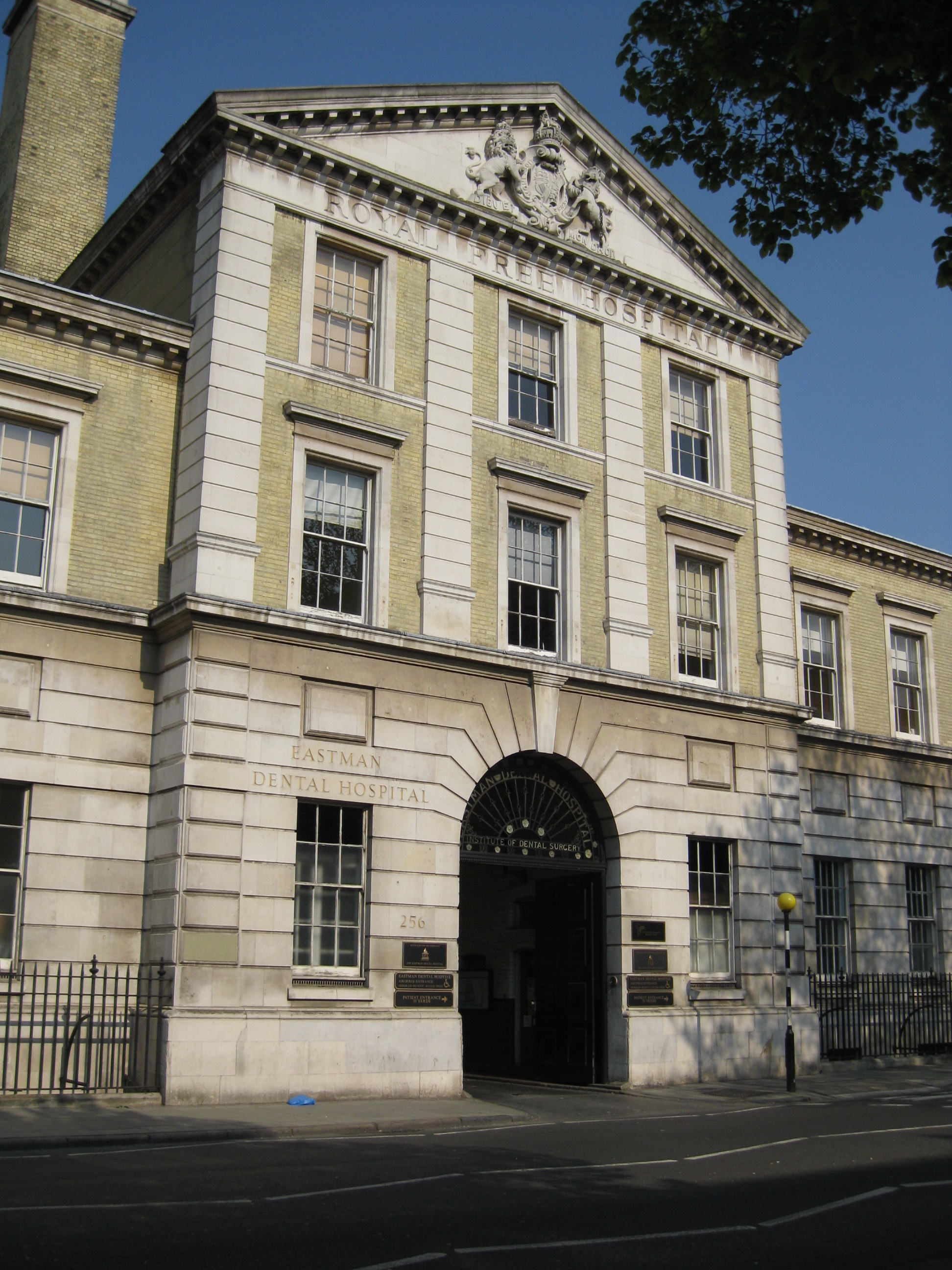
Eastman Dental Hospital

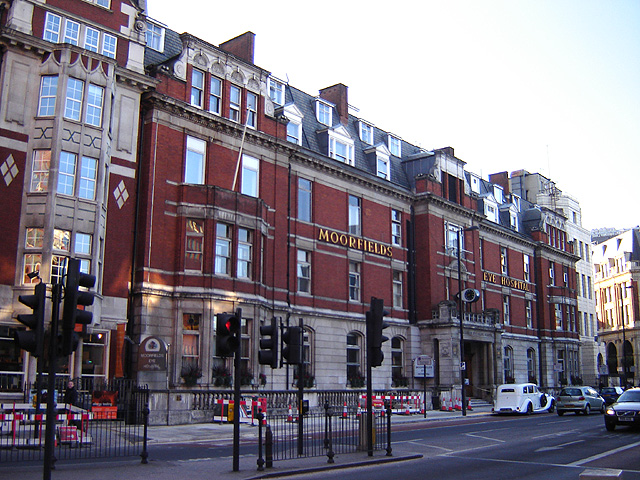
Moorfields Eye Hospital

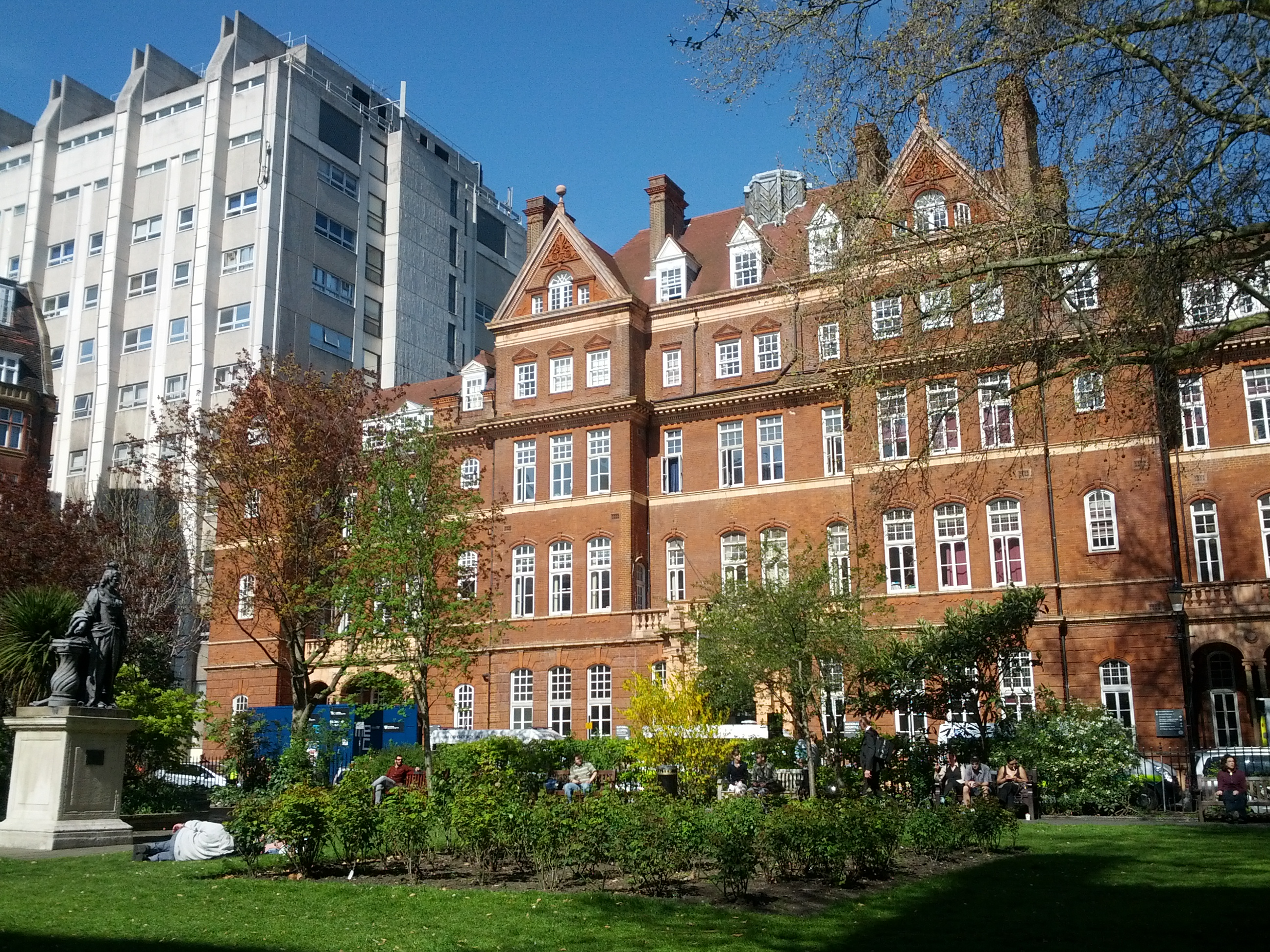
National Hospital for Neurology and Neurosurgery

=== Research institutes ===
UCL Medical School is associated with the following research institutes:

- UCL Cancer Institute
- UCL Ear Institute
- UCL Eastman Dental Institute
- UCL Institute of Child Health
- UCL Institute of Neurology
- UCL Institute of Nuclear Medicine
- UCL Institute of Ophthalmology
- UCL Institute of Orthopaedics and Musculoskeletal Science
- UCL Wolfson Institute for Biomedical Research at UCL
- National Institute for Medical Research (NIMR)

UCL Medical School forms part of the UCL Faculty of Medical Sciences, together with the Division of Medicine, Division of Infection and Immunity, Division of Surgery and Interventional Science, UCL Cancer Institute, UCL Eastman Dental Institute and UCL Wolfson Institute.

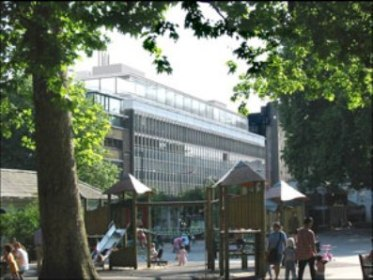
The UCL Institute of Child Health on Guilford Street in Bloomsbury

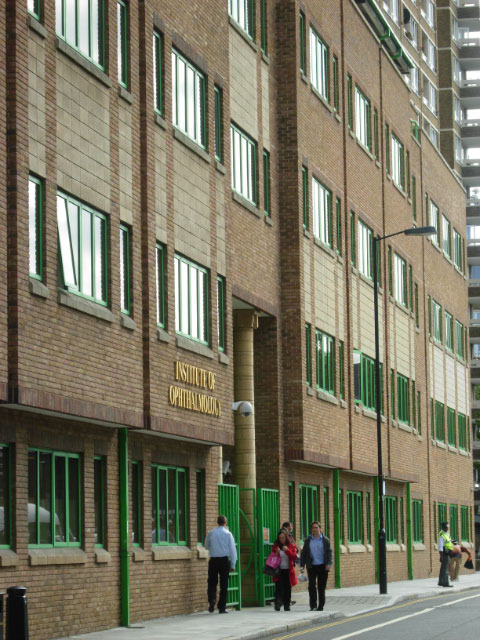
The UCL Institute of Ophthalmology

== Rankings ==
In the 2022 QS World University Rankings by Subject, UCL was ranked 7th in the world (3rd in Europe, 1st in London) for Medicine.

In the 2022 Academic Ranking of World Universities subject tables, UCL was ranked 16th in the world (and 4th in Europe) for Clinical Medicine.

== Student societies ==
All students at UCL Medical School are also members of The Royal Free, University College and Middlesex Medical Students’ Association (RUMS MSA) – a student-led organisation independent of UCL Medical School. RUMS has been formed in the wake of the merger between the three constituent medical schools in 1998. Its predecessor, The Middlesex Hospital Medical Society is reportedly the oldest student society in England having been formed in 1774. Since its formation in 1998, RUMS (RUMS) provides social events, sports teams, societies, welfare services and representation to the 1200 or so medical students at UCL Medical School.

In 2011, UCLU Medical Society was established separate from RUMS MSA to provide careers advice and peer teaching for medical students, as well as special interest events. These events can be centrally organised or by various subdivisions or "sections" within the society ranging from those devoted to medical specialities such as Paediatrics or General Practice to Medical Leadership & Management and Global Health. Since 2012, one of the most popular sections of UCLU Medical Society has been UCLU Med Soc Education, which provides peer-to-peer and near-peer teaching events, run by medical students for other medical students. The novelty of this section is their collaboration with the medical school faculty to ensure quality and validity of the student-produced material and student-led teaching on offer.

== Notable alumni ==
Notable alumni of UCL Medical School and its predecessor institutions include:

- Emmanuel Quaye Archampong, Emeritus Professor of Surgery at the University of Ghana
- Josephine Barnes, championed the cause of women's health throughout her illustrious career. First female president of the British Medical Association in 1979
- Herbert Barrie, neonatologist
- Charles Bolton, appointed Commander of the Order of the British Empire (CBE)
- Ruth Bowden Professor of Anatomy, Royal Free Hospital School of Medicine, author of important scientific papers on peripheral nerve damage.
- John Bowlby, pioneer of attachment theory
- Michael Brown, former Physician to the Queen
- George Budd, physician after who Budd-Chiari Syndrome is named after
- Walter Carr, physician and surgeon
- G. Marius Clore FMedSci, FRS, Member of the United States National Academy of Sciences, molecular biophysicist and structural biologist known for foundational work in three-dimensional protein and nucleic acid structure determination by multidimensional NMR spectroscopy.
- Archie Cochrane, physician who pioneered randomised controlled studies and after whom The Cochrane Library is named.
- Leslie Collier, virologist who helped to create the first heat stable smallpox vaccine key in the eventual eradication of the disease.
- Major-General Sir Ernest Marshall Cowell, surgeon and military officer in the Royal Army Medical Corps
- Mildred Creak, child psychiatrist
- Jane Dacre, former President of the Royal College of Physicians (2014–2018), only the third female President in its nearly 500-year history
- Campbell De Morgan, 19th century surgeon
- Deborah Doniach, leading expert on auto-immune diseases
- Wilfrid Edgecombe (1871–1963), surgeon, spa doctor, instrumental in the founding of Harrogate District Hospital.
- Jeremy Farrar, director of the Wellcome Trust
- Marcus Flather, Clinical Professor in Medicine at the University of East Anglia
- William Henry Flower, comparative anatomist and 2nd director of the Natural History Museum.
- Eva Frommer. Fellow of the Royal College of Psychiatrists, child psychiatrist and pioneer of arts therapies in hospital, for children.
- Frances Violet Gardner. Introduced angiocardiography to UK; Dean of Royal Free Hospital School of Medicine.
- Alfred Baring Garrod, physician who linked raised urate levels in the blood as the cause of gout
- Clare Gerada, former Chair of the Royal College of General Practitioners (2010–13), the first female Chair for 50 years
- Alan Powell Goffe, pathologist whose research contributed to the development of the polio and measles vaccines
- Ben Goldacre, academic and science writer
- Michael Goldacre, Professor of Public Health, University of Oxford
- Wendy Greengross(1925–2012), general practitioner and broadcaster
- Gillian Hanson, intensive care specialist
- Anita Harding, neurologist who co-authored the first paper which identified pathogenic mitochondrial DNA mutation in human disease (in Kearn-Sayre syndrome).
- Victor Horsley, pioneering Neurosurgeon
- Allan Octavian Hume, one of the founders of the Indian National Congress
- Philip James, CBE, medical academic and expert on nutrition and obesity
- Leander Starr Jameson, physician, politician and leader of the Jameson raid on whom Rudyard Kipling based his poem If-.
- Donald Jeffries, leading expert on HIV
- Christian Jessen, television presenter
- John William Kibukamusoke, a Ugandan physician, an academic, a personal physician to Idi Amin, and the first Ugandan High Commissioner to Australia.
- Nick Lane, biochemist and writer
- Thomas Lewis, cardiologist who was appointed CBE and also knighted.
- Joseph Lister pioneer of anti-septic surgery, who after receiving a bachelor's degree from UCL, trained at UCLH winning several gold medals during his time there Kalman Mann, 8th director general of Hadassah Medical Organization
- Hugh Llewellyn Glyn Hughes, CBE, DSO & 2 bars, MC, MRCS. Brigadier Royal Army Medical Corps
- Henry Marsh, neurosurgeon who was appointed CBE.
- Arthur Martin-Leake, soldier who received both the Victoria Cross and the Bar.
- Clare Marx, first female president elected at the Royal College of Surgeons of England (2014-2017)
- Henry Maudsley, prominent psychiatrist after whom The Maudsley Hospital is named
- Ramani Moonesinghe, consultant in Anaesthetics and Critical Care Medicine and Associate National Clinical Director for Elective Care for NHS England
- Michael Mosley, television journalist and presenter
- Gladys Miall-Smith, first doctor in Welwyn Garden City
- Catherine Neill, paediatric cardiologist at Johns Hopkins Hospital
- Hugh Owen Thomas, father of orthopaedic surgery in Britain
- Max Pemberton, medical doctor and journalist
- Amanda Ramirez, professor of liaison psychiatry at King's College London
- Philip Randle, the Randle cycle is named after him
- Bernard Ribeiro, Baron Ribeiro, former President of the Royal College of Surgeons of England (2005–08). Life peer in House of Lords since 2010.
- Sydney Ringer, a British clinician, physiologist and pharmacologist, best known for inventing Ringer's solution.
- William Scoresby Routledge, ethnographer
- Rosemary Rue, physician and civil servant
- Mary Patricia Shepherd, thoracic surgeon
- Elizabeth Joan Stokes, clinical bacteriologist
- Edward Treacher Collins, ophthalmologist and first described Treacher Collins Syndrome
- Dawson Turner, rugby union international who represented England (1871–75).
- Margaret Turner-Warwick, first female president elected at the Royal College of Physicians (1989-1992)
- Laura Veale, first qualified female doctor practising in Harrogate and the North Riding of Yorkshire
- Sir John Williams, 1st Baronet, of the City of London, gynaecologist and obstetrician to Queen Victoria
- Albertine Winner, physician and medical administrator
- R. A. Young, physician and expert on tuberculosis

== Sources ==
- University College Hospital and Its Medical School: A History by W R Merrington (1976) ISBN 0-434-46500-3
