= Eric James Mellon =

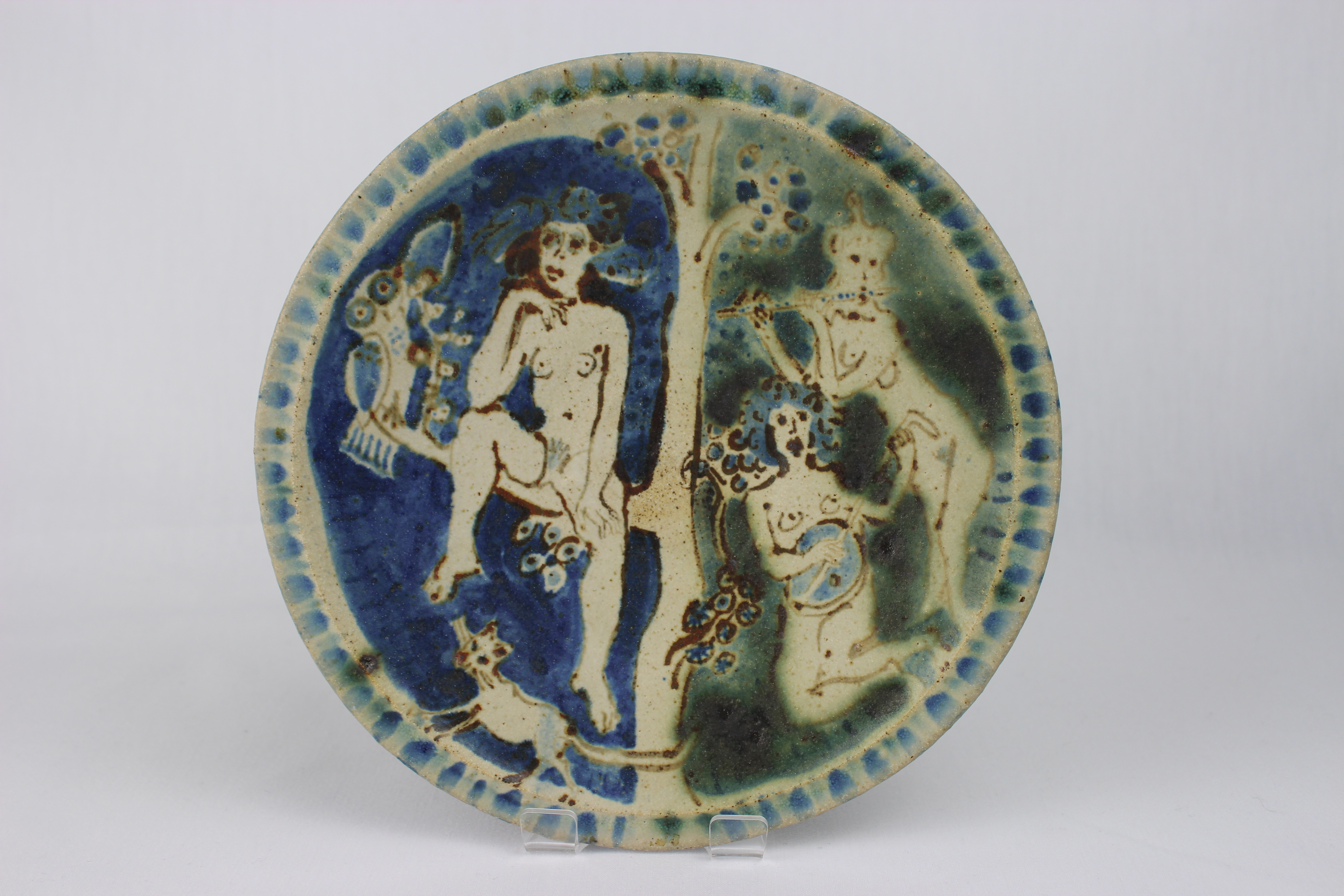
Thrown Bowl by Eric James Mellon

Eric James Mellon (30 November 1925 – 14 January 2014) was a ceramic artist who specializes in using ash glaze and underglaze graphic drawings of figures.

== Biography ==
Trained at the Central School of Arts and Crafts in London (1945–47), he was awarded his National Diploma in Design: Illustration (1947). In the early 1950s he set up an artistic community at Hillesden, Buckinghamshire, with his friend Derek Davis and others. In 1956 he married the artist Martina Thomas and the following year moved to a house he built at Bognor Regis in West Sussex.

Mellon died on 14 January 2014 at the age of 88.

== Development of Work ==
In 1958 he was introduced to making stoneware, and since that time he has devoted his life mainly to the research of decorating stoneware pots with figurative drawings and glazing them with ash glazes. By using ash glazes he joined the tradition of craft potters established in the early decades of the twentieth century by Bernard Leach, followed by Katherine Pleydell-Bouverie. Pursuing that tradition, in recent years he has solved the problem of an excess of calcium in ash from trees and has been using ash obtained from bean plants—which is higher in potassium and permits the drawings to be 'held' at stoneware temperatures, c. 1250 degrees Celsius.

His work is featured in several books about ceramics, notably Phil Rogers, Ash Glazes – Second Edition (A & C Black & University of Pennsylvania Press, 2003) and Paul Foster (Ed.,) Eric James Mellon: Ceramic Artist (University College Chichester, 2000). In 2007 the University of Chichester published the book "Decorating Stoneware" on his work and techniques, especially ash glazes, written by Mellon and Professor Paul Foster of the university.

== Public collections ==
Public collections featuring his work include ceramics in the Victoria and Albert Museum and York Art Gallery, and pictures in Falmouth Art Gallery, Discover Bucks Museum and the Otter Gallery at the University of Chichester.
