= University of Chichester =

University in West Sussex, England

- Coat of Arms (official)
- Former names: West Sussex Institute of Higher Education (1977–1995), Chichester Institute of Higher Education (1995–1999), University College Chichester (1999–2005)
- Motto: Latin: Docendo discimus
- Motto in English: By teaching, we learn
- Type: Public
- Established: 2005
- Affiliations: Cathedrals Group; Universities UK
- Vice-Chancellor: Symeon Dagkas
- Administrative staff: 600
- Students: 6,375 (2024/25)
- Undergraduates: 4,595 (2024/25)
- Postgraduates: 1,780 (2024/25)
- Location: Chichester, West Sussex, England; 50°50′41″N 0°46′28″W
- Campus: Semi-urban
- Website: chi.ac.uk
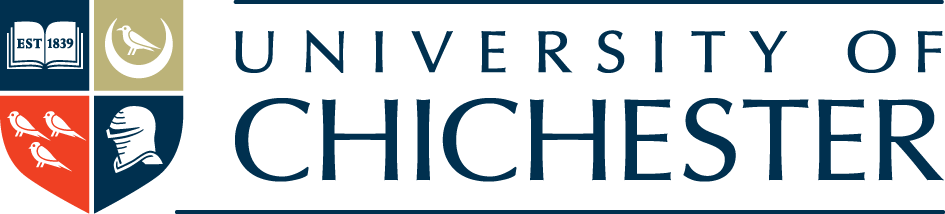

Rankings
National rankings
- Complete (2027): 58=
- Guardian (2027): 31
- Times / Sunday Times (2027): 57

The University of Chichester is a public university located in West Sussex, England, which became a university in 2005. Campuses are based in the city of Chichester and the nearby coastal resort of Bognor Regis and an associate campus for commercial music on the Isle of Wight.

The University of Chichester has 14 departments, with specialisms including Humanities, Sport, Musical Theatre, Acting and Education. Its heritage stretches back into the nineteenth century when, in 1839, Bishop Otter College was established. Since 2013, both campuses have seen major expansion-led building works through National Lottery funding and other funding.

The University of Chichester is a member of the Cathedrals Group.

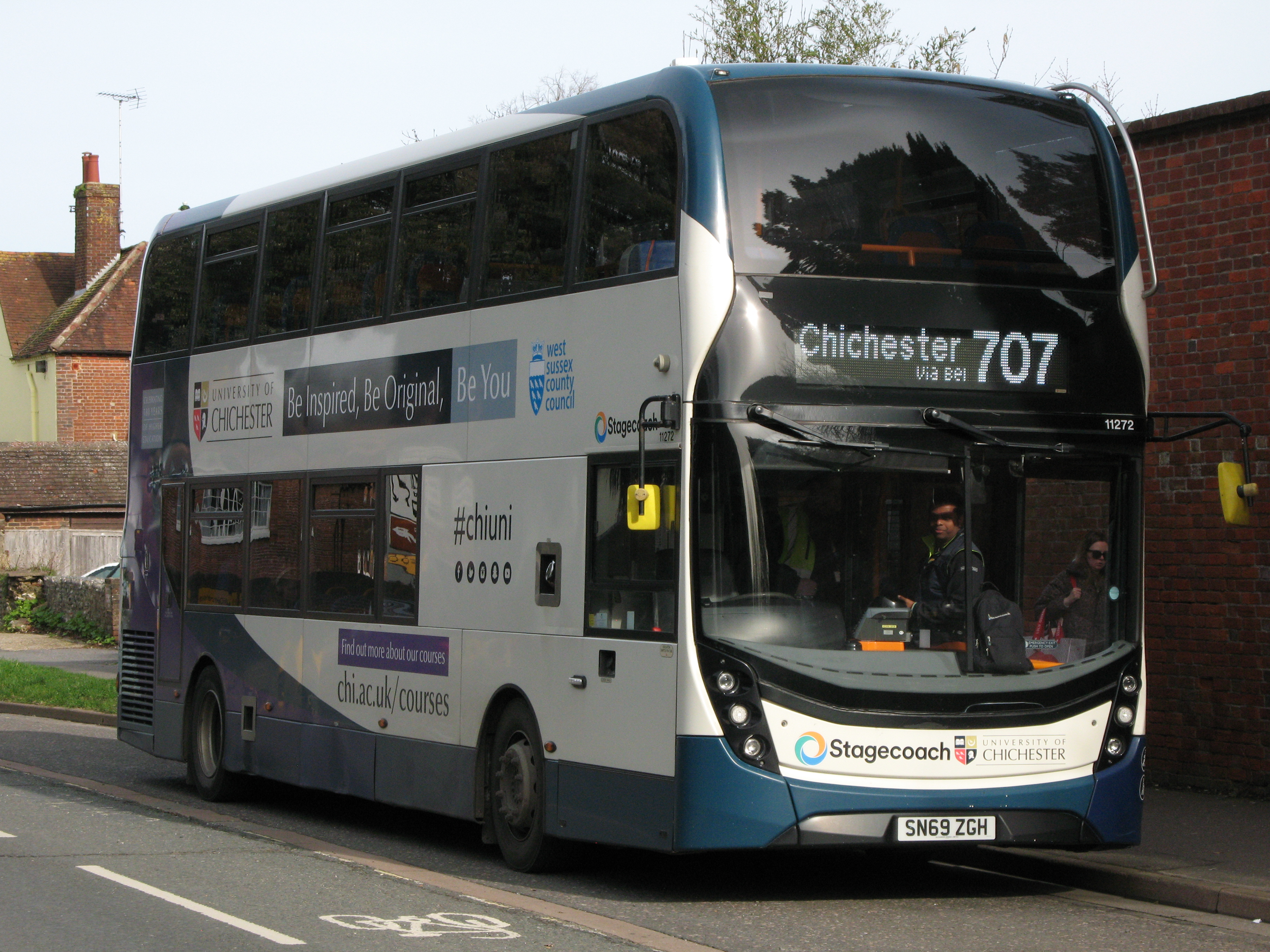
A Double Decker Stagecoach bus running the 707 route to Chichester

== History ==
The University of Chichester coat of arms

In 1840, a school for training 'Masters' was founded by William Otter, Bishop of Chichester, which was rebuilt in his memory as the Bishop Otter College in 1849. The original buildings, created in a neo-Tudor style, were designed by the architect J. Butler.

In 1873, the campus became a training institute for women teachers due to the activism of Louisa Hubbard after the Elementary Education Act 1870 which created demand for school teachers. Fanny Trevor was appointed as the first "Lady Principal" of this teacher training college for women after she offered to work for nothing, starting in 1873.

Dorothy May Meads was the Principal of Bishop Otter College from 1936 until her retirement in 1947. Between 1942 and 1945, during World War II, the Air Ministry requisitioned the Bishop Otter College for the planning of D-Day. Meads moved the facility to the Old Bishop's Palace in Bromley (the site of Stockwell College of Education). This was briefly closed when the threat of bombing seemed high. The college moved again in 1944, to Lady Margaret Hall, Oxford. The college eventually returned to Chichester at the end of the war. Under Meads the college estate was expanded with her establishing new advanced courses in craft work, gardening and physical education. She was also responsible for the building of a new gymnasium.

Elisabeth Murray was the principal from 1948 until her retirement in 1970. Murray purchased sculptures and pictures from the likes of Henry Moore, Stanley Spencer and Graham Sutherland, and invited national figures to speak to staff and students at the college. She also introduced co-education, instituted responsibility for self-appraisal in student matters and grew the college's governing body. Men were admitted to the college in 1957.

In the 20th century, the campus was gradually expanded to meet demand. There was a large extension in the 1960s, including a steep gabled cruciform chapel, designed by the architect, Peter Shepheard.

During the 1970s, the Principal of Bishop Otter College was Gordon McGregor, who went on to be Principal of Ripon and York St John and latterly emeritus Professor of Education at the University of Leeds.

At Bognor Regis, a teacher training college was founded in the 1940s to support the expansion of education.

In 1977, Bishop Otter College and the Bognor Regis college were merged to form the West Sussex Institute of Higher Education (WSIHE), with degrees being awarded by CNAA and later the University of Southampton. Alumni from this period include the actor Jason Merrells and the author Paula Byrne. Between 1995 and 1999, it was known as Chichester Institute of Higher Education. It gained degree-awarding powers in 1999, becoming known as University College Chichester, and became recognised as a full university in October 2005.

In 2015, the University of Chichester secured government and lotteries commission funding to the value of approximately £8 million and embarked on a plan of expansions at both academic sites, involving the demolition of several smaller collegiate structures that were no longer suitable for purpose, and the construction of facilities for academia, administration and sports.

In 2016, the Chichester campus underwent redevelopment with a new Academic Building for lecture and seminar rooms, student union shop and a sprung dance space. Other work included construction of a Sports Dome, Chapel extension, courtyard, Sports Hall and Gym refurbishment, as well as major development work on the Library and Learning Resources Centre (LRC) which has three floors. In January 2017, the multi-million pound purpose-built Academic Block was opened, hosting lecture and seminar rooms, a new Students' Union shop and a sprung floor dance space.

In 2018, the university opened a new £35 million Tech Park which houses the Creative Industries and Engineering, Computing and Maths departments. The Tech Park was opened by the Duke and Duchess of Sussex.

In 2021, it opened its Nursing and Allied Health building on the Chichester campus. This 1,600-square-foot teaching headquarters was part of a multi-million pound development.

In 2022, the University of Chichester appointed former NHS leader Dame Marianne Griffiths as its first Chancellor.

In 2024, the University of Chichester appointed Professor Symeon Dagkas as Vice-Chancellor.

== Campuses ==
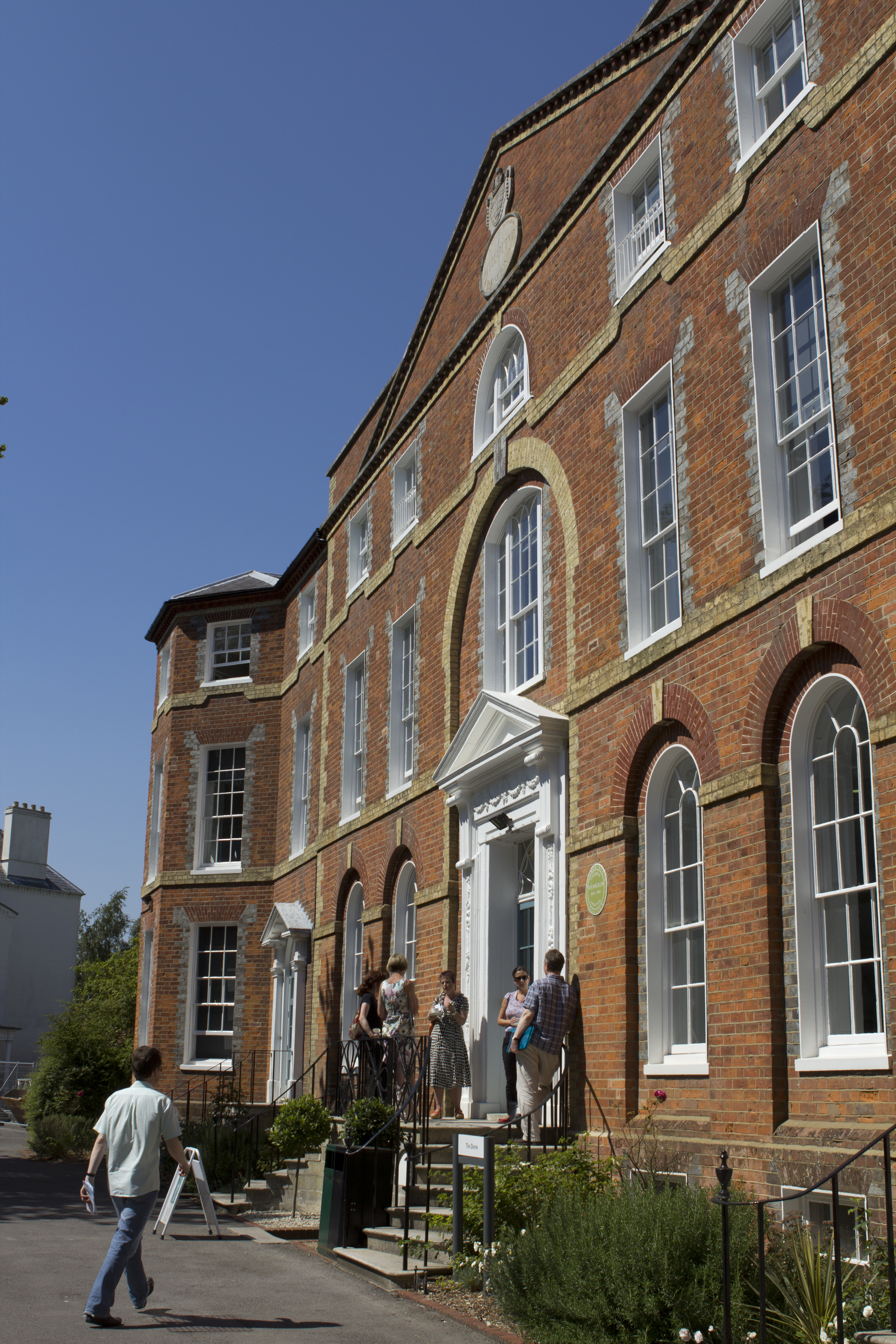
'The Dome', home of the Education department at the University of Chichester, built as a Royal Palace in 1787

=== College Lane ===
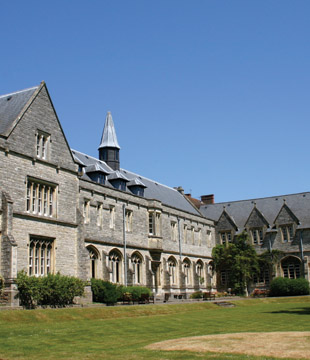
University House completed in 1849

Chichester campus or Bishop Otter Campus is situated at College Lane, Chichester, and includes historic buildings and modern facilities. It is a five-minute walk from Chichester city centre. Chichester Festival Theatre is adjacent to the campus. Chichester City Football Club, Chichester Rugby Club and Chichester Racquets and Fitness Club are all adjacent to the campus.

The Otter Gallery was located within the LRC. It offered public art exhibitions and workshops throughout the year. It was permanently closed against public protest at the end of 2018.

=== Bognor Regis ===
The Bognor Regis Campus is in a leafy environment five minutes from the sea, and comprises three mansion houses with Georgian architecture: St Michael's, the Dome and Mordington House. The Bognor Regis Campus is close to Hotham Park. The park surrounds Hotham House, built in 1792 by Sir Richard Hotham. Also nearby is the Ice House – the original 18th century refrigerator of Hotham Park Estate.

The university's £35 million Tech Park was opened on Wednesday 3 October 2018 by the Duke and Duchess of Sussex.

The University of Chichester has a bus route run by Stagecoach South, the 707. It runs between campuses and is free to students upon presentation of a valid UoC Student/Staff ID Card. It runs every day except Sundays (excluding bank holidays).

== Organisation ==
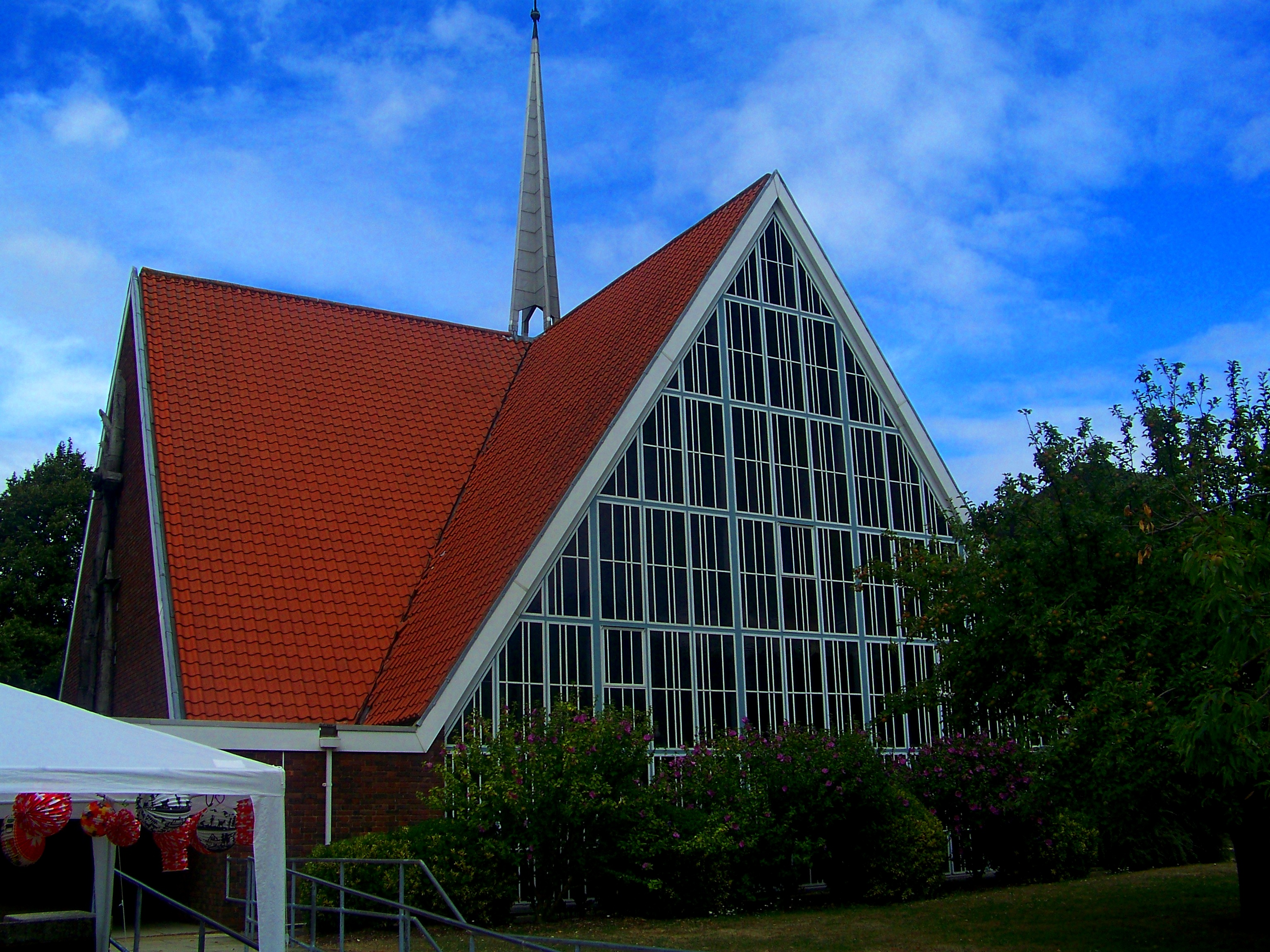
University of Chichester Chapel completed 1962

The university department structure can be found below.

- Business School
- Childhood, Social Work and Social Care
- Creative Industries
- Computing
- Dance
- Education
- Engineering and Design
- English and Creative Writing
- Fine Art
- Humanities
- Music
- Nursing and Allied Health
- Psychology and Counselling
- Sport including Adventure Education, Sport Sciences, PE, Sport Development and Sport Management
- Theatre (Performing Arts)

== Academics ==
- Jonathan Little
- Laura Ritchie
- Andrew Sant

== Alumni ==
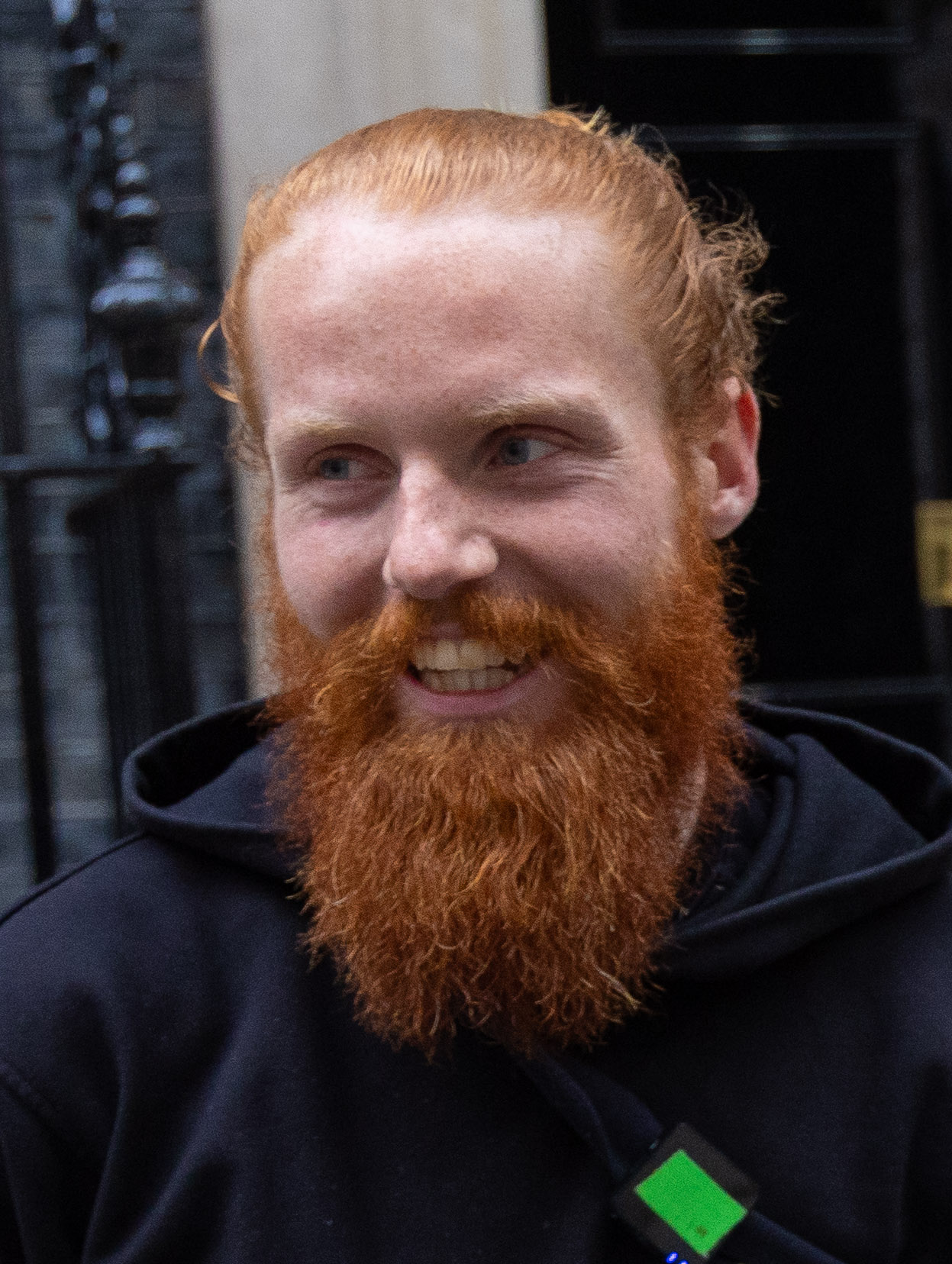
Endurance athlete Russ Cook was awarded an honorary Master of Sport degree in 2025.

Name	Graduated	Notability	Ref.
Jess Brown-Fuller	2013	Member of Parliament for Chichester	
Michael Yardy	2017	English cricketer	

== See also ==
- Armorial of UK universities
- College of Education
- List of universities in the UK
