= Dorothy May Meads =

British historian

- Born: 21 December 1891; Retford
- Died: 20 October 1958 (aged 66)
- Alma mater: University of Nottingham

Dorothy May Meads (21 December 1891 – 20 October 1958) was a British historian and the principal of Bishop Otter College which is now the University of Chichester. She conducted the first major study of early women's education.

== Early life and education ==
Meads was born in 1891. Her mother was Annie and her father, Charles Walter Gladish, ran Gladish & Sons. After she completed her schooling at Stoneygate College in Leicester she won a scholarship that enabled her to be the first person from her family to attend university. She went to University College, Nottingham, to read history. She graduated with a degree awarded by the University of London and holding a scholarship for a master's degree. Her master's degree created the book The Tudor Privy Council in 1915. During her time at the university she was a leading light of the student's union creating the union's first handbook and helping with the student magazine. Her fellow students, including her future husband, jovially created a court where she was found guilty of "despotism in Union affairs".

== Career ==
She resigned from teaching after her husband died in 1917 and returned in 1921 to lecture at Dudley Teacher Training College. In 1925 she decided to gain a doctorate in women's history. At the time not all women were allowed to vote and although women could study at Cambridge University they were not allowed to have a degree. She was supervised by the Shakespearean scholar Prof. J. Dover Wilson and she decided to study the early education of women of all backgrounds. Her supervisor was involved with The Review of English Studies, and she was welcomed into that circle.

Meads became the principal of Bishop Otter College in 1936 which had become a training institute for women teachers in Chichester in 1873 due to the activism of Louisa Hubbard. Fanny Trevor had been the first Lady Principal.

She had ambitious plans and the college estate expanded. A gym was built that assisted in teaching physical education which was one of her new courses that including gardening and craft. Between 1942 and 1945 the site was requisitioned and Meads moved the facility to Stockwell College in Bromley. She briefly closed the college when the threat of bombing seemed high. She retired in 1947 expressing regret that ill-health had obliged her to leave her plans unfinished.

== Personal life ==
She married John Arthur Meads whom she had met at university in 1917. He joined the Sherwood Foresters and gained a Military Cross. He was killed nine months after their marriage and she resigned from teaching for some years.
