= Laura Ritchie =

American cellist (born 1973)

- Born: United States
- Occupations: Cellist, Professor of Learning and Teaching in Music
- Employer: University of Chichester
- Known for: Higher music education, cello performance
- Notable work: Fostering Self-efficacy in Higher Education Students, California Dreaming
- Awards: National Teaching Fellowship (2012)

Laura Ritchie (born November 1973, in the United States) is a cellist and Professor of Learning and Teaching in Music at the University of Chichester, where she leads the Music with Teaching (Instrumental / Vocal), MA Performance Programmes, and an annual Cello Weekend.

In 2012, she was awarded a National Teaching Fellowship from the Higher Education Academy. She has published two books: Fostering Self-efficacy in Higher Education Students and California Dreaming.

Laura Ritchie studied cello in America with Hans Jørgen Jensen and in London with Steven Doane. She is a member of the Brighton-based band The Mummers.
