= Nathaniel Polhill =

British Member of Parliament (1723–1782)

Nathaniel Polhill (1723–1782) was a British merchant and politician who served as a Member of Parliament in the House of Commons from 1774 to 1782.

== Early & Personal Life ==
Born on 7 January 1723, Polhill was the eldest son of William Polhill of Burwash, Sussex, and his wife Hannah Lade, daughter of Stephen Lade of Downham, Norfolk. He married Elizabeth Coppard, daughter of William Coppard of Hastings, on 5 March 1750. They had six children, including Nathaniel Polhill (1756–1782), who married Ursula, daughter of Ebenezer Maitland MP; and John Polhill (1757–1828), whose son was Frederick Polhill (1798–1848).

He bought Howbury Hall, Renhold, Bedfordshire from the Becher family in 1781 for £17,500. On his death, Howbury passed to his son Nathaniel (1756-1782), however he died soon after. It passed to his son Nathaniel (1782–1802). He died aged 19, and it passed to his uncle John (1757–1828), and later to his son Frederick (1798–1848). It remains in the family to this day.

Nathaniel Polhill senior died on 29 August 1782, leaving behind estates spanning five counties.

== Career ==
Primarily engaged in the tobacco trade in Southwark, he later became a partner in a City bank from 1777 onwards.

During the general election of 1774, Polhill contested the Southwark constituency, advocating for both economic and parliamentary reform. He successfully secured a seat in the House of Commons after achieving the highest poll results. In the subsequent 1780 general election general election, he was once again elected for Southwark following a competitive contest. Considered a Radical, Polhill was an influential figure within the Protestant Association and his sole recorded parliamentary speech involved seconding Lord George Gordon's motion concerning the Association's petition.

Parliament of Great Britain
Preceded by Joseph Mawbey; Henry Thrale	Member of Parliament for Southwark; 1774–1782; With: Henry Thrale; Richard Hotham	Succeeded by Henry Thornton; Richard Hotham
