= Mary Wheatland =

English swimming instructor and life saver

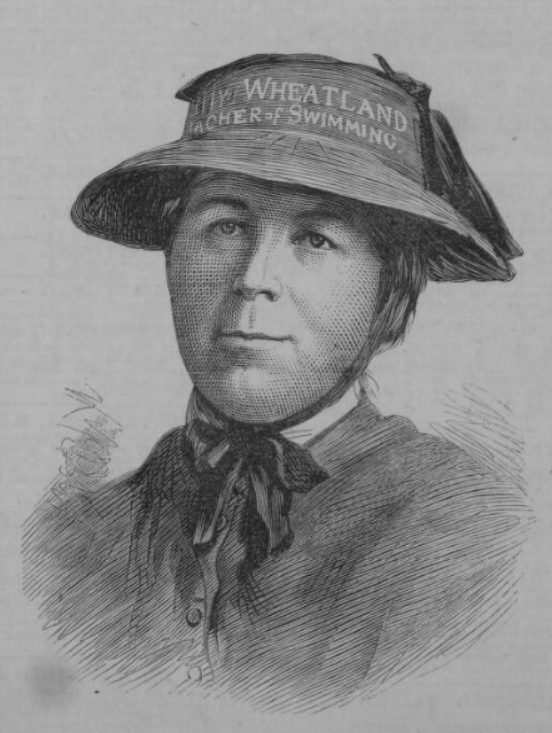
- Wheatland in 1879
- Born: Mary Norris; 16 August 1835
- Died: 1 April 1924 (aged 88)
- Known for: life-saving

Mary Wheatland (née Norris, 16 August 1835 – 1 April 1924) was a swimming instructor, bathing machine keeper and life-saver. Wheatland who was credited with saving over 30 lives and was a recipient of the Royal Humane Society's Bronze Medal and testimonial on vellum.

Mary Norris was born in 1835 in the Sussex village of Aldingbourne. By the age of 14 she moved to Bognor to work for a Mrs Mills. Originally a domestic servant she was appointed to run the bathing machines belonging to Mrs Mills. She would continue to run the bathing machines until 1909.

In 1857 she married George Wheatland with whom she had seven children.

Working by the sea and a keen and strong swimmer Wheatland took to the waters to rescue bathers who had got into difficulties, the first rescue being recorded when she was still only aged 16. By 1879 she had rescued 13 people and the Royal Humane Society recognised her achievements and presented her with the society's testament on vellum.

George died in 1880 leaving Mary to carry on working and to raise the children.

In 1903 a benefit concert was arranged for her at which she was presented with the Royal Humane Society Bronze Medal, a second testament on vellum and a silver medal for gallantry by the publishers of the magazine, Golden Penny. (Note: Golden Penny was a magazine published between 1895 and 1909 dedicated to adventure tales. The magazine's silver medal for gallantry was issued between 1901 and 1904. Only 37 awards of the medal were made.)

Wheatland retired in 1909 but continued to be seen around town until her death in 1924.
