= J. Dover Wilson =

20th-century British Shakespearean scholar

J. Dover Wilson CH
- Born: John Dover Wilson; 13 July 1881; Mortlake, England
- Died: 15 January 1969 (aged 87); Balerno, Scotland
- Occupations: Literary scholar and academic
- Title: Regius Professor of English Literature

Academic background
- Education: Lancing College
- Alma mater: Gonville and Caius College, Cambridge

Academic work
- Discipline: English studies
- Sub-discipline: English Renaissance drama; William Shakespeare
- Institutions: King's College London; University of Edinburgh
- Doctoral students: Dorothy May Meads
- Notable works: What Happens in Hamlet (1935)

John Dover Wilson CH (13 July 1881 – 15 January 1969) was a professor and scholar of Renaissance drama, focusing particularly on the work of William Shakespeare. Born at Mortlake (then in Surrey, now in Greater London), he attended Lancing College, Sussex, and Gonville and Caius College, Cambridge. He taught at King's College London before becoming Regius Professor of English literature at the University of Edinburgh.

In 1925 he took on Dorothy May Meads as a doctoral student to study early women's education, following on from his own work. This was said to be the first major study.

Wilson was primarily known for two lifelong projects. He was the chief editor, with the assistance of Sir Arthur Quiller-Couch, of the New Shakespeare, a series of editions of the complete plays published by Cambridge University Press. Of those editions, the one of Hamlet was his particular focus, and he published a number of other books on the play, supporting the textual scholarship of his edition as well as offering an interpretation. His What Happens in Hamlet, first published in 1935, is among the more influential books ever written on the play, being reprinted several times including a revised second edition in 1959.

Wilson's textual work was characterised by considerable boldness and confidence in his own judgement. His work on the complicated matter of the transmission of Shakespeare's texts, none of which survive, was based upon the theory that no published edition of any play was supervised directly by the playwright. This theory necessarily meant that all of the texts were mediated by compositors and printers—giving to modern editors more freedom in making changes. His work was highly respected, though some of his theories have since been eclipsed by new scholarship. However, when the textual principles he painstakingly established did not support the reading that seemed right to him, he would depart widely from them, earning him a reputation for both brilliance and capriciousness; Stanley Edgar Hyman refers to the "valuable (sometime weird)" New Shakespeare. In his interpretations that juxtaposition was heightened without the support of his arduous textual work. These interpretations included a reading of the famous bedroom scene between Hamlet and his mother that remains influential (if frequently questioned) to this day, but also peculiar ideas about covert Lutheranism and almost completely unsourced speculation about Shakespeare's relationship with his son-in-law. The influential Shakespearean W. W. Greg, Wilson's nemesis, once referred to Wilson's ideas as "the careerings of a not too captive balloon in a high wind."

In 1969 he completed a posthumously-published memoir, Milestones on the Dover Road.

== Major works ==
- The New Shakespeare. Cambridge University Press, 1921–1969 (Editor).
- Life in Shakespeare's England: A Book of Elizabethan Prose. Cambridge UP, 1911. (reissued by Cambridge University Press, 2009; ISBN 978-1-108-00261-5)
- The Elizabethan Shakespeare. Milford, 1929.
- The Essential Shakespeare: A Biographical Adventure. Cambridge UP, 1932.
- The Fortunes of Falstaff. Cambridge UP, 1944.
- What Happens in Hamlet. 2nd edition. Cambridge UP, 1959.
- Shakespeare's Happy Comedies. Faber and Faber, 1962.
