= Frederick Trevor =

English cricketer civil servant

Personal information
- Full name: Frederick George Brunton Trevor
- Born: 28 October 1838; Madras, Madras Presidency; British India
- Died: 20 February 1925 (aged 86); Richmond Hill, Surrey, England
- Batting: Unknown

Domestic team information
- Years: Team
- 1864: Marylebone Cricket Club

Career statistics
Competition	First-class
Matches	1
Runs scored	12
Batting average	6.00
100s/50s	–/–
Top score	8
Balls bowled	8
Wickets	0
Bowling average	–
5 wickets in innings	–
10 wickets in match	–
Best bowling	–
Catches/stumpings	–/–
- Source: Cricinfo, 25 May 2021

Frederick George Brunton Trevor CIE (28 October 1838 – 20 February 1925) was an English first-class cricketer and civil servant.

The son of The Reverend George Trevor, he was born at Madras in British India. He was educated in England at Marlborough College, where he played for the college cricket eleven, featuring in their first match against Rugby School in 1855. Trevor later played first-class cricket for the Marylebone Cricket Club (MCC), making a single appearance against Middlesex in 1864. Batting twice in the match, he was dismissed for 8 runs in the MCC first innings by Thomas Hearne, while in their second innings he was dismissed by the same bowler for 4 runs. He served as a civil servant at the India Office, where he rose to become director of funds. He was made a Companion to the Order of the Indian Empire in the 1900 New Year Honours. Trevor died at Richmond Hill in February 1925; he was last surviving Old Marlburian from the 1855 Marlborough v Rugby match.
