= The Mummers =

Musical group

- Origin: Brighton, England
- Genres: Electronica; Alternative pop Baroque pop
- Years active: 2006–present
- Label: Big Bass Drum
- Members: Raissa Khan-Panni; Paul Sandrone; Tessa Gilles; Maddie Rix; Lindsey Oliver; Loz Thomas; Rob Heasman; Laura Ritchie
- Past members: Mark Horwood (deceased)

The Mummers are a band based in the English coastal city of Brighton, centred on London-born singer/songwriter Raissa Khan-Panni, composer Mark Horwood (before taking his own life in September 2009), producer/writer Paul Sandrone and co-producer/manager Alastair Cunningham.

== Biography ==
Raissa Khan-Panni, once better known as Raissa, is a singer whose origins include English, Chinese, Indian, and Mexican. She was raised in the South London district of West Norwood, and as a child studied classical music, learning the piano and then oboe. She spent her school-days busking in Leicester Square and later all over Europe, before returning to study music in Bristol. In 2000 she enjoyed critical acclaim across the media spectrum, most notably with the album Believer released by Polydor Records and the single "How Long Do I Get" which was played extensively on UK radio stations.

Despite the acclaim, by 2001 the solo projects were winding down and Khan-Panni returned to work, waitressing full-time in a Brixton restaurant. She describes this period as "a time of having nothing again" when, after several years of excitement, she returned to the mundane and the ordinary. However, she was still writing lyrics which began by documenting this period of her life but soon spun out to a fantasy world as her mind wandered while working.

In September 2009, Mark Horwood committed suicide. The band states they intend to 'honour his spirit completely'.

== Discography ==
=== Studio albums ===
- Tale to Tell (2009) – Big Bass Drum

=== Extended plays ===
- Mink Hollow Road (2011) – Big Bass Drum
