= Derek Davis (artist) =

English artist

Sunbathing
- Artist: Derek Maynard Davis
- Type: Acrylic on canvas
- Dimensions: 30 cm × 40 cm (12 in × 16 in)

Derek Maynard Davis (24 February 1926 – 3 September 2008) was an English artist, working in the media of painting and pottery. He was born in Wandsworth, South London, where he was educated at Emanuel School. He joined the King's Royal Rifle Corps in 1943, to fight in World War II. After the war he entered the Central School of Arts and Crafts in London. Together with his friend Eric James Mellon he then started a pottery workshop in Hillesden, Buckinghamshire. Later he left to work on his own, and moved to Arundel, West Sussex. Here he developed his ceramics further, coming up with several innovative techniques. An eye operation in 1994 left him unable to look through the hole in the pottery kiln, and after this he started focusing on painting instead.

Davis's work is characteristic for breaking with the functionalistic style of Bernard Leach, which was prevalent in the post-war years. Davis was self-taught within the field of pottery, and his method has been described as "working as much by instinct as plan". His pottery was featured at several separate exhibitions, and he had commissions from the Barbican Centre and the British embassies in Brasília, Rome, Warsaw, and Riyadh. Davis met his wife Ruth Lambert in Ventnor on the Isle of Wight, where he spent some time in a sanatorium after college, suffering from tuberculosis. Ruth, a patient at the same institution, was also a painter. The couple married in 1953, and they had one son. Davis died in Chichester 4 September 2008.
