= Hotham Park House =

Country house in Bognor Regis, West Sussex, England

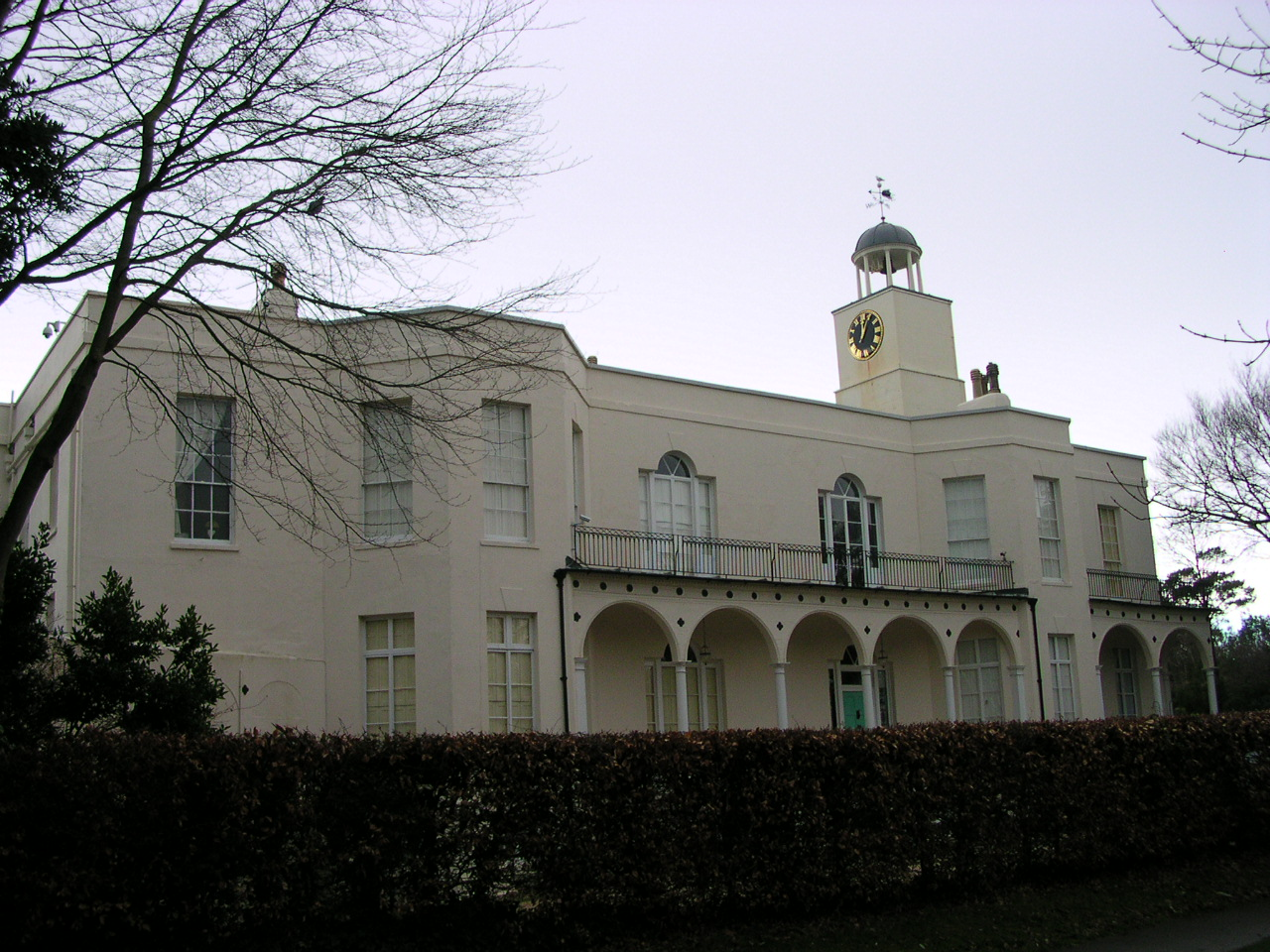
- Hotham Park House in 2009

- Location within West Sussex
- Former names: Chapel House; Bersted Lodge; Aldwick Manor; Hotham Lodge

General information
- Location: Bognor Regis, West Sussex, England
- Coordinates: 50.7866°N 0.6672°W
- Year built: 1792

Listed Building – Grade II*
- Official name: Hotham Park House
- Designated: 4 August 1971
- Reference no.: 1027745

Hotham Park House is a Grade II* listed 18th-century country house in Bognor Regis, West Sussex, England. It stands in the 22-acre (8.9 ha) Hotham Park, now a public open space.

The house, originally called Chapel House after a nearby chapel, was built in 1792 by Sir Richard Hotham, the founder of Bognor, as his main residence. After the chapel was demolished in the 1850s, the house was renamed Bersted Lodge, then Aldwick Manor and subsequently Hotham Lodge. It is built of stuccoed brick in two storeys with a six-bay (but 10 window) frontage.

== History ==
Sir Richard Hotham, a London hatter, moved to the Bognor area in the late 18th century and laid the foundation stone of the town in 1787. He commissioned the building of the present house, with its own private chapel, in 1792, but died a few years later in 1799.

In the early 1800s, the house belonged to a Jamaican planter Thomas Smith who had married Susannah Mackworth-Praed. He died in 1825 but his widow continued to live in the house until her own death in 1856. Her brother-in-law, John Bourke, 4th Earl of Mayo, died there in 1849.

John Ballett Fletcher bought the house in 1857 and had the chapel demolished, except for its tower. In 1899 the house, then called Bersted Lodge, passed to his eldest son William Holland Ballett Fletcher (1852–1941) who renamed it Aldwick Manor in honour of the fact that he had inherited the Lordship of the Manor of Aldwick. He improved the surrounding parkland by planting trees, shrubs and exotic plants in collaboration with Kew Gardens. His only son was killed on active service in 1915 and when he himself died in 1941 the house was taken over by the Ministry of Pensions for the remainder of the Second World War. After the war the park was acquired by the then Bognor Regis Urban District Council and developed as an amenity for the people of Bognor. The house itself remained empty until 1977, at which time it was acquired and renovated by Abraham Singer and subsequently converted into luxury flats. It was designated a Grade II* listed building in 1971.

Today the house is owned by Arun District Council, but leases the flats via a head lease.

== See also ==
- Grade II* listed buildings in West Sussex
