= Raissa (singer, born 1971) =

English singer-songwriter

Raissa Khan-Panni
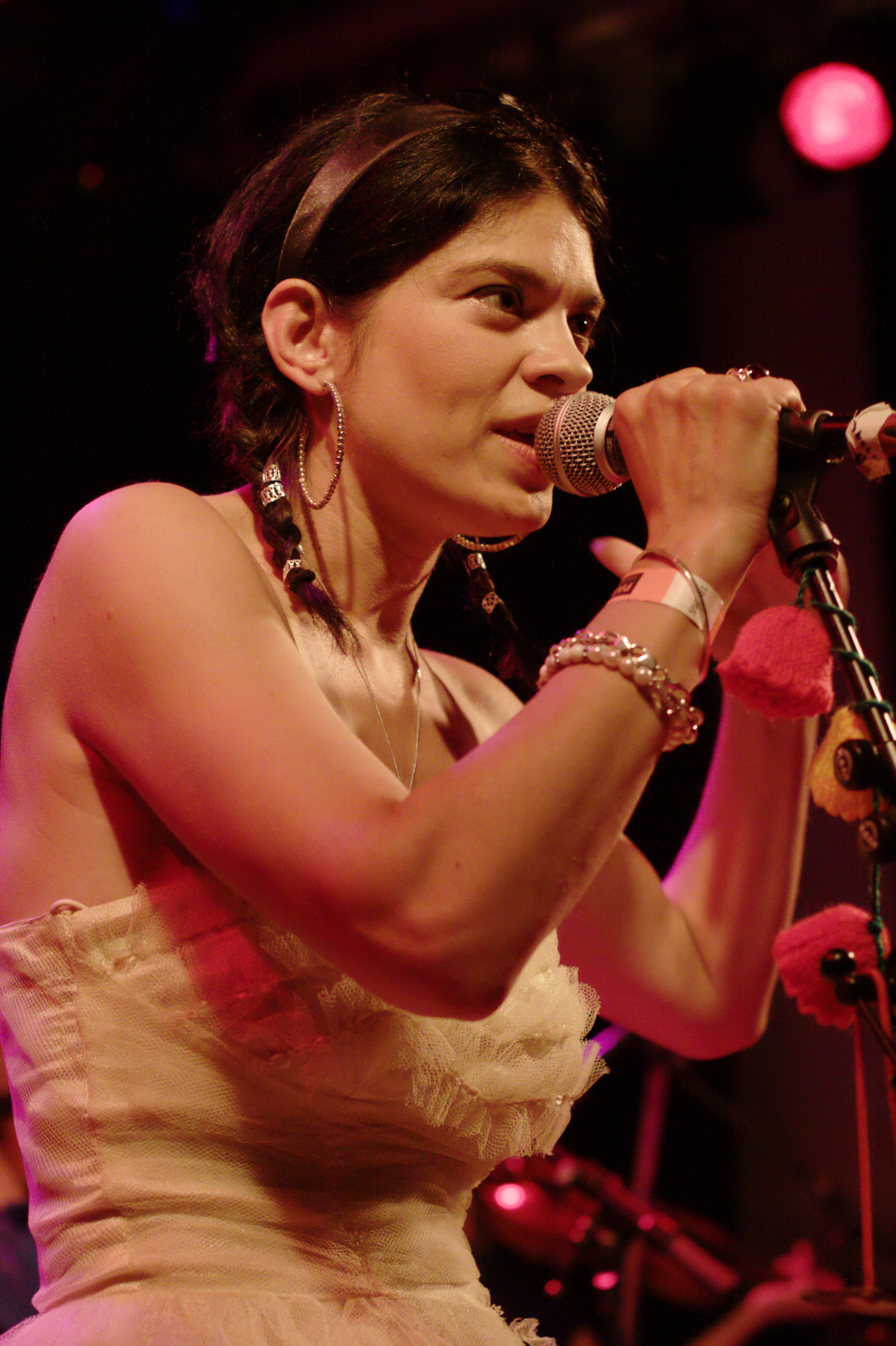
- Raissa, Amsterdam 2009

Background information
- Born: 1971 (age 54–55); Lambeth, London, England
- Genres: Electronica; Alternative; Pop

Raissa Khan-Panni (born 1971) is an English singer-songwriter who records under the name Raissa. She is best known for the 2000 single, "How Long Do I Get", which was playlisted by UK radio stations. The song reached No. 47 in the UK Singles Chart.

== Biography ==
Raissa was born and grew up in middle-class south London, in Lambeth. Her mother is English and her father of mixed Chinese, Indian, and Mexican ancestry. Raised in South London, Raissa met regular collaborators Paul Sandrone and Dan Birch while studying music in Bristol during the 1990s. This partnership has produced three albums, including 1999's Believer. She is closely associated with the group Suede, having twice supported the band on UK tours and contributing vocals to Suede's cover of Noël Coward's "Poor Little Rich Girl" on the Twentieth-Century Blues tribute album.

Raissa has also worked with several other musicians including Dobie and dance duo LHB, for whom she performed guest vocals during their support slot on Kylie Minogue's 2002 arena tour. Raissa was collaborating on the Brighton based project The Mummers, with Mark Horwood and Paul Sandrone before the former's suicide in late 2009.

== Discography ==
=== Albums ===
- Sleeping Bugs (1996) – Big Cat
- Meantime (1997) – Polydor
- Believer (1999) – Polydor
- The Mummers, Tale to Tell (part one) (2008) – Big Bass Drum
- The Mummers, Tale to Tell (2009) – Big Bass Drum
- The Mummers, Mink Hollow Road (2011) – Big Bass Drum
