= Edward Morris (historian) =

British art historian

Edward Samuel Morris (10 August 1940 – 29 May 2016) was a British art historian perhaps best known for his "masterly" French Art in Nineteenth Century Britain.

== Early life ==
Edward Samuel Morris was born on 10 August 1940 in Bognor Regis, the son of Edward Cadman Morris, a British Navy officer, and Winifred Morris. He was educated at Rugby School and Peterhouse, Cambridge. In 1964, he gave up a well-paid city job to study a master's degree in art history at London's Courtauld Institute of Art, where he was taught by the novelist Anita Brookner and the spy Anthony Blunt.

== Career ==
Morris was curator of fine art at Liverpool's Walker Art Gallery from 1966 to 1999, and chairman of the editorial board of the PMSA's National Recording Project from 1997 to 2015.

== Death ==
He died of double pneumonia on 29 May 2016.

== Publications ==
French Art in Nineteenth Century Britain (Yale University Press, 2005) ISBN 9780300106893
