= Fanny Trevor =

British historian

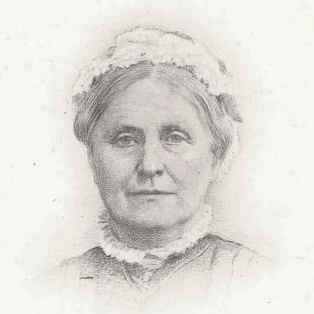
- Born: 1810s Bridgwater
- Died: 19 September 1904; Richmond
- Employer: Bishop Otter College

Sarah Frances "Fanny" Trevor (c.1818 – 1904) was a British educator who was the first college principal of Bishop Otter College after it was relaunched as a teacher training college for women in the 1870s. This college became the University of Chichester.

== Life ==
Trevor was born in Bridgwater in 1818 (or before) as she was baptized at Burnham-on-Sea on 2 August 1818. Her elder brother, in a large family, was the cleric George Trevor. Her parents were Christian (born Witherell) and Charles Trevor, who worked for the local customs.

Trevor was of independent means and did not need to work. Until she was in her mid fifties she lived with different family members in Somerset as first her father, then her mother and an elder brother died.

In the early 1870s Bishop Otter College in Chichester was relaunched as a teacher training institute for women due to the activism of Louisa Hubbard after the Elementary Education Act 1870 (33 & 34 Vict. c. 75) which created an increased demand for school teachers. Hubbard was a strong supporter and helped to gather funds. Florence Nightingale wrote to Hubbard giving her support to the new college. The Chichester diocesan board of education placed an advert in The Guardian for a Lady Superintendent who would answer to a male cleric. She would be paid £100 a year and he would be paid £120 per year.

Trevor applied for the position and she was appointed on 30 October 1872 not as "Lady Superintendent" but as the first "Lady Principal" of this teacher training college for women after she offered to work for nothing. With the support of the educationalist Sir James Kay-Shuttleworth the college re-opened in February 1873. Staff were employed and in the following year the college employed the educationalist Charlotte Mason as a senior governess when staff did not last long. Mason left after four years as the job was "too trying".

Trevor encouraged her students to exercise. She would walk her Bernese Mountain Dog each lunchtime and her students were encouraged to also walk or play tennis. Cycling was encouraged and students could bring their own to college or borrow a bike. The Reverend Hammond organised a college cycling club.

In 1882 she was appointed as "Principal" and she was given a salary of £150 per year in recognition of the contribution she was making. Two years later she became ill and her job title returned to "Lady Principal". She again agreed to work for nothing so that her salary could be redirected to fund a deputy.

Trevor's position was undermined by the college chaplain who was given complete authority for religious instruction. Trevor resigned for unrecorded reasons in 1895 but it is suspected that it was conflict with the college chaplain.

Trevor was briefly replaced by another woman but in the following year the college returned to its original intention of having a clergyman as principal with a woman employed in a secondary position. They appointed a woman as "Matron" looking after just welfare and discipline.

In 1886 Lord Cross led the Royal Commission on Elementary Education Acts and in June of the first year Trevor was called to give evidence. In a single day she replied to over 270 questions. She made clear that she was opposed to the idea of pupil-teachers, governesses who did not use corporal punishment and denominational teaching.

Trevor retired to Richmond in Surrey where she died at her home, Denmark House, in 1904.
