= Hotham Park =

Public park in Bognor Regis, West Sussex, England

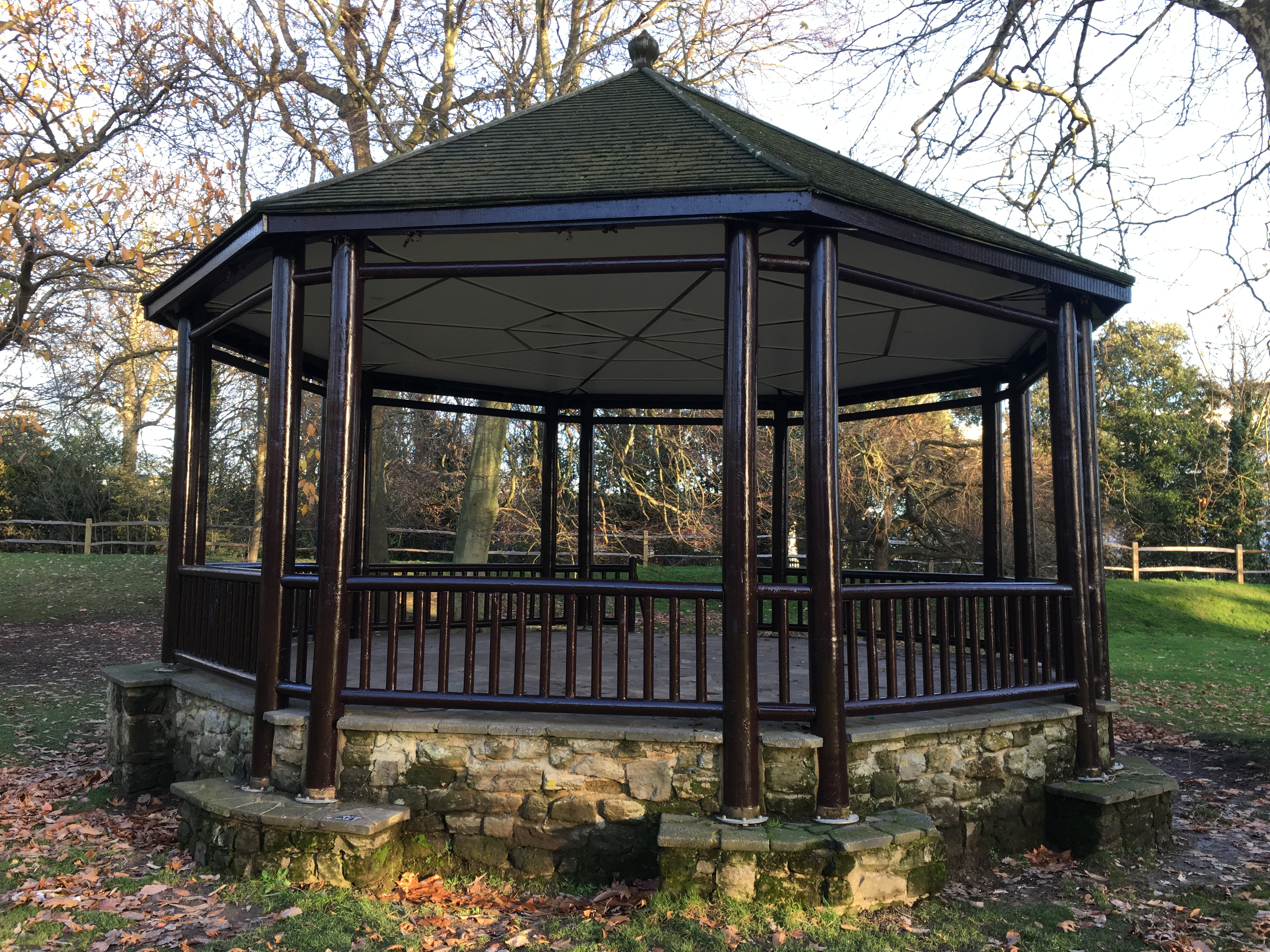
- Hotham Park bandstand after refurbishment, pictured in 2018

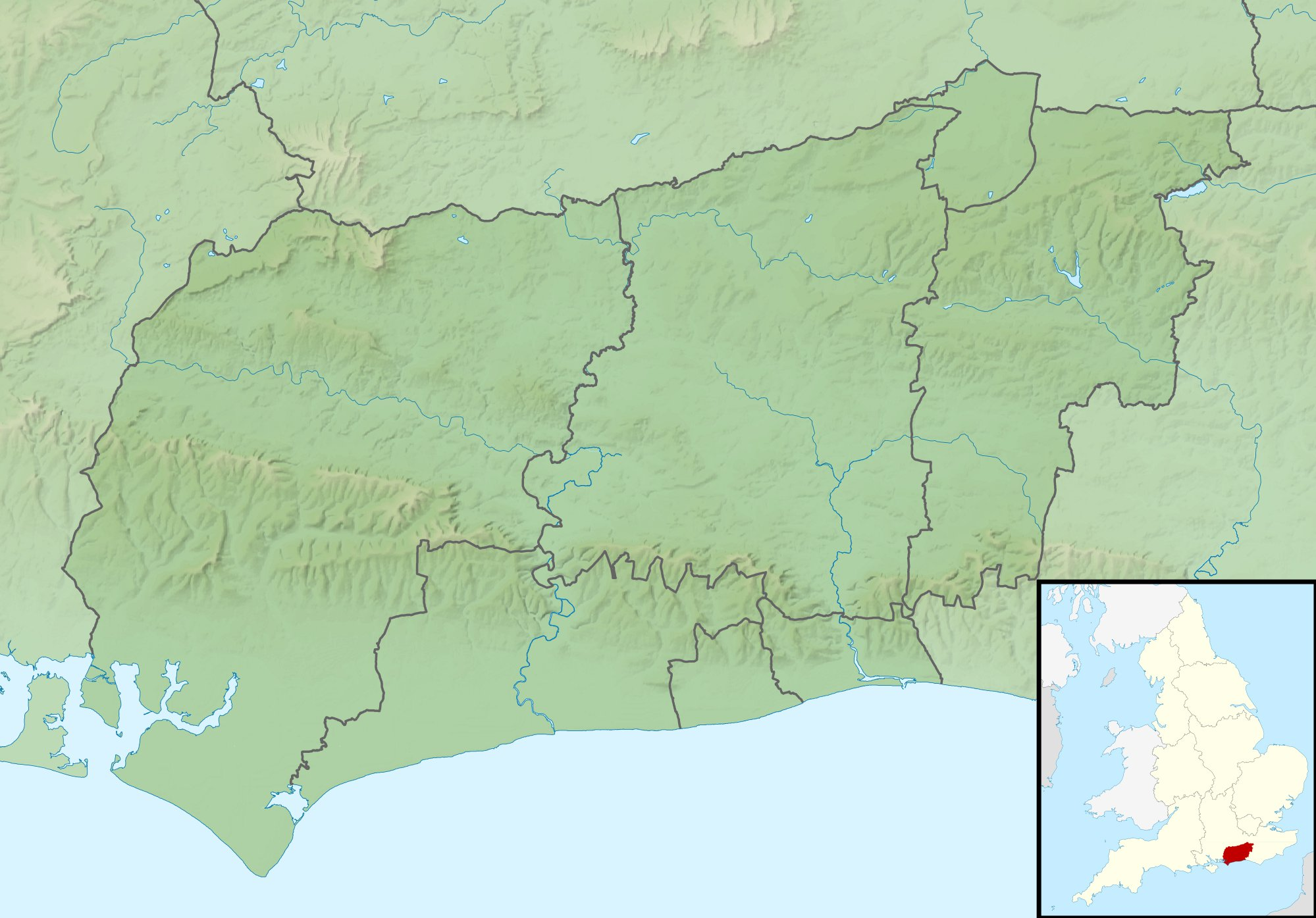
- Location within West Sussex
- Location: Bognor Regis, West Sussex, England
- Coordinates: 50.7875°N 0.66836°W
- Created: 1947

Hotham Park is a public park in the seaside town of Bognor Regis, West Sussex, England, in the United Kingdom. It was established by the founder of Bognor Sir Richard Hotham, who formerly resided at Hotham Park House (built 1792) which still stands today. Since becoming a public park in 1947 Hotham Park continues to be a popular local attraction for residents of the town as well as holiday makers. The park is located nearby to Butlins and the town centre.

== Description ==
In 2018 an adventure golf course opened, named Widforest Falls and themed on forest animals from around the world.

Hotham Park's playarea was refurbished in 2018 with the support of the Hotham Park Heritage Trust. The refurbishment includes a new ability swing for wheelchair users which can be accessed using a RADAR key.

Hotham Park Cafe opened on 22 July 2015 following a £400,000 investment in the park by Arun District Council. Designed by architect Phil Brown and built by Falcon Homes the cafe was 'Highly Commended' at the Sussex Heritage Awards in 2017.

Other amenities in the park include a boating lake, miniature railway, picnic areas, wildlife pond, arboretum and formal planting. Hotham Park is maintained and managed by Arun District Council in partnership with the Friends of Hotham Park and principal contractors Tivoli Group Limited.

The 'Discovery Garden', an informal garden with sensory plants and learning zone, is used weekly by a local Forest School to teach.

Bognor Regis Parkrun operates each week, often attracting over 300 runners.

Hotham Park is a Green Flag Award winning park.

== Gallery ==
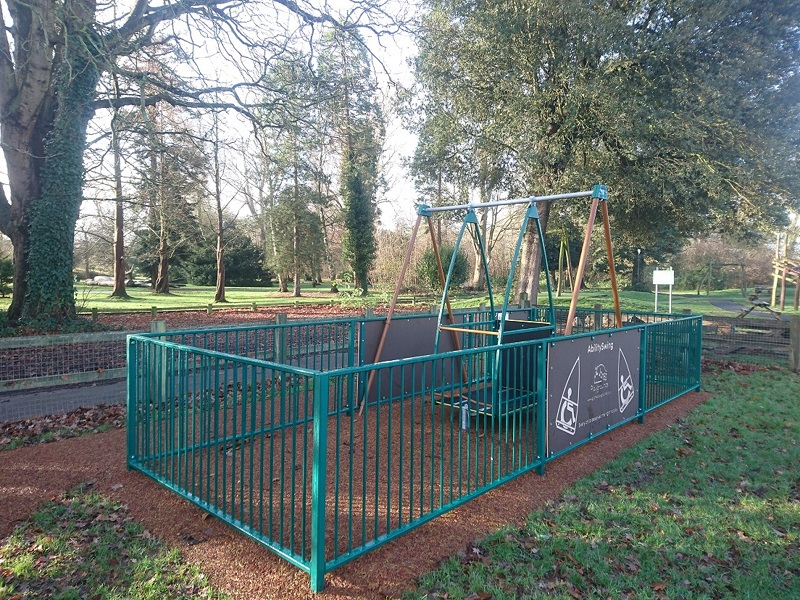
New Ability Swing – operated using a RADAR key

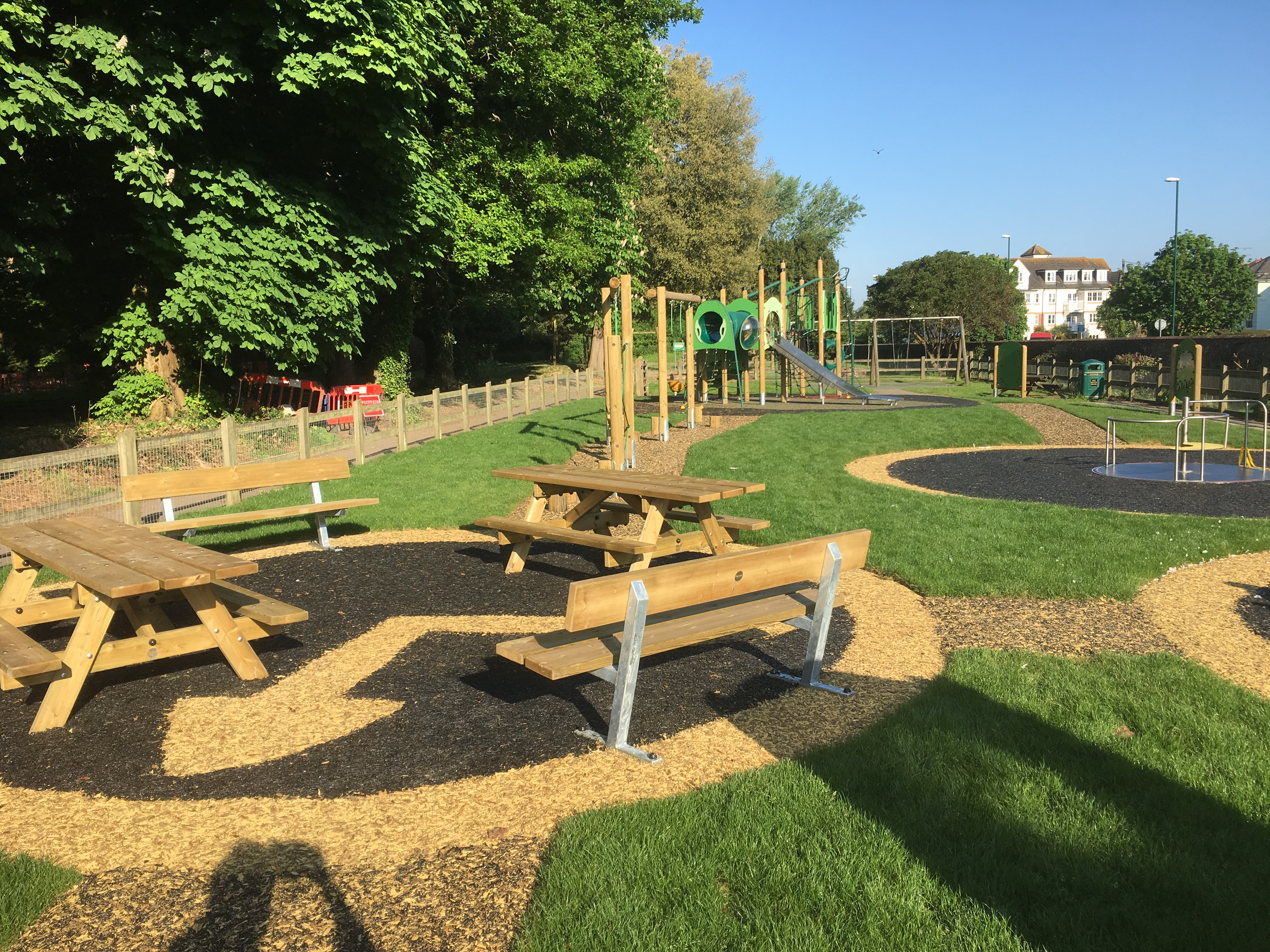
New picnic area

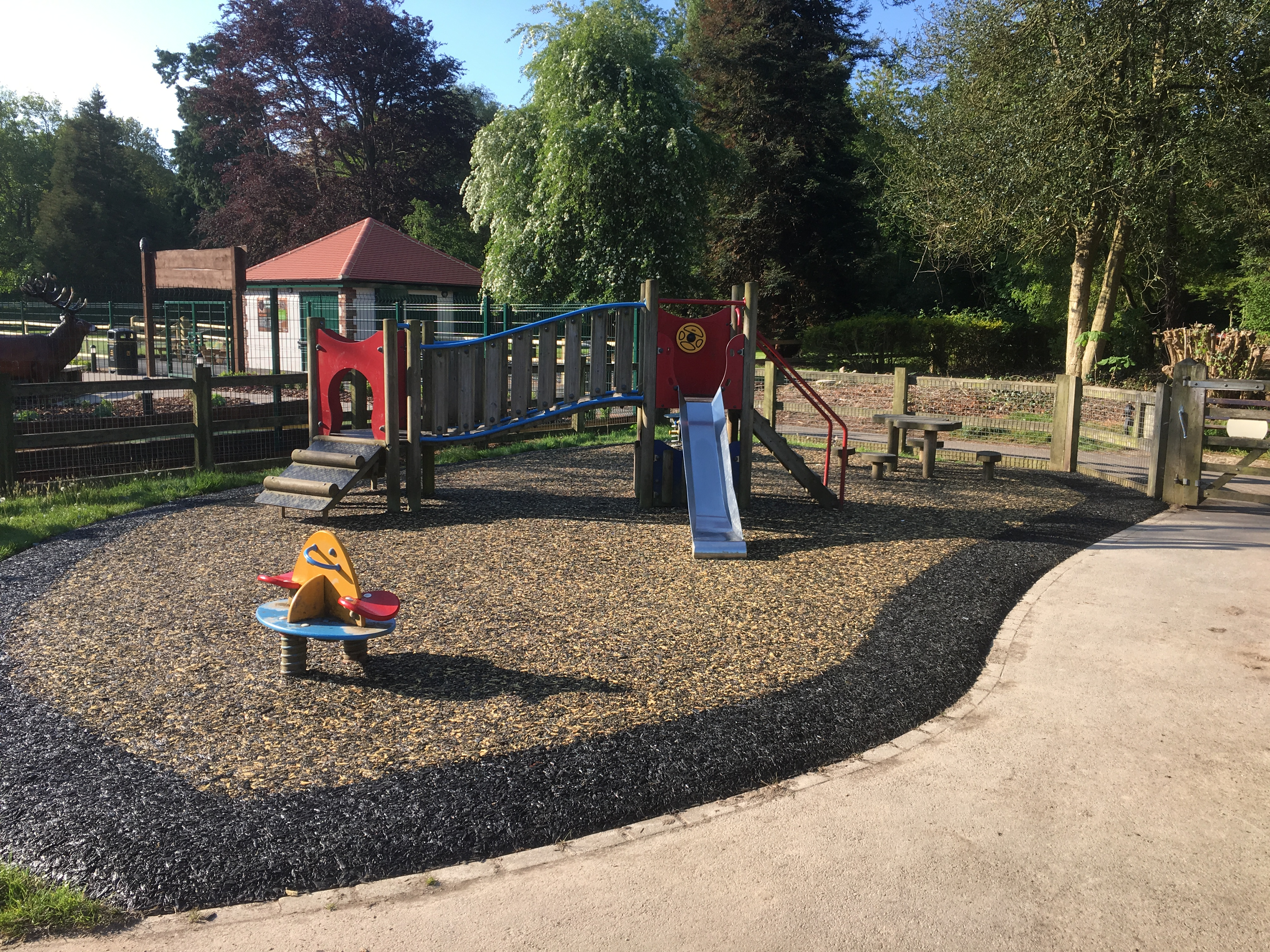
Toddler climbing frame

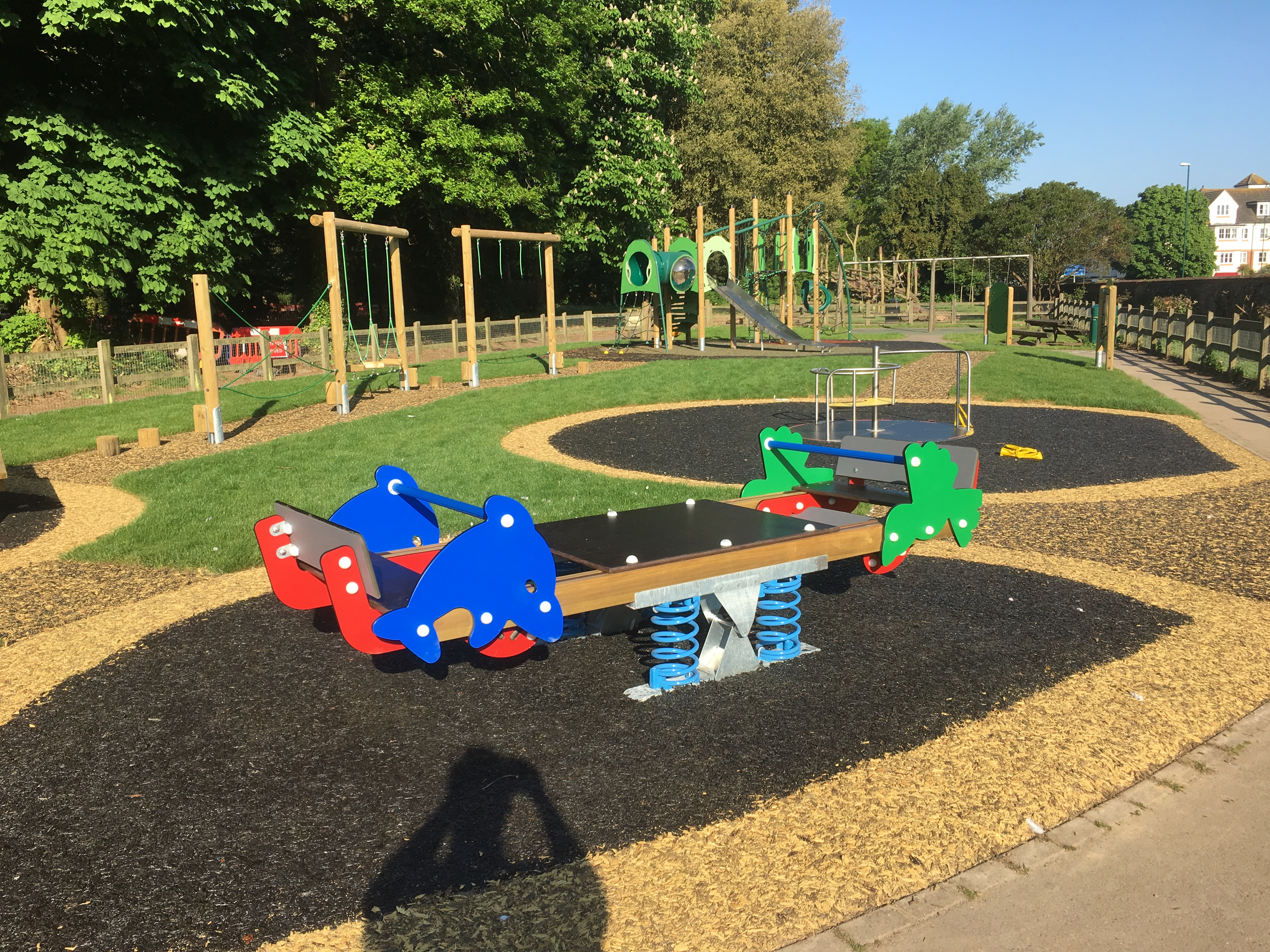
New seesaw

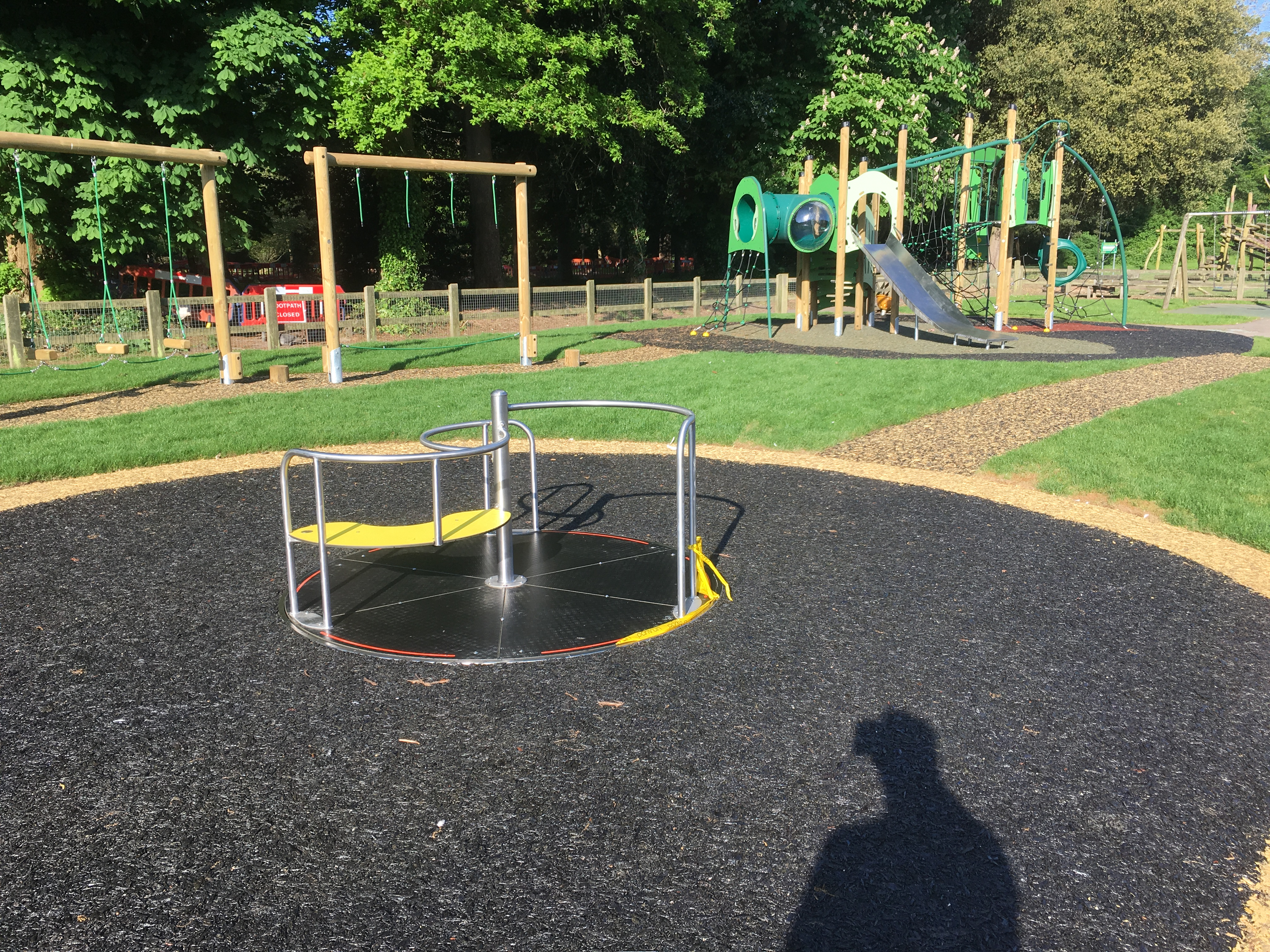
New accessible roundabout

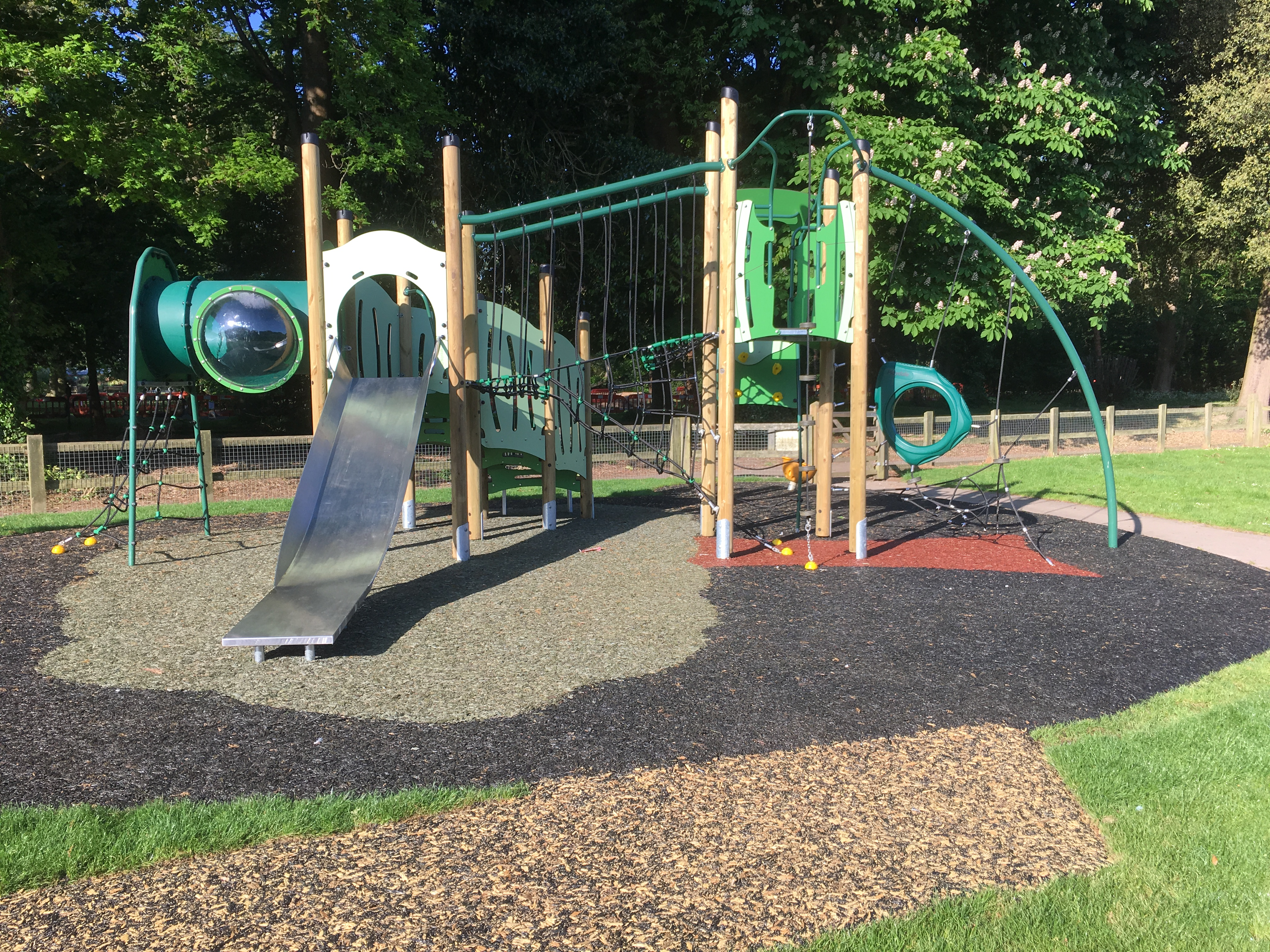
New climbing frame
