= Richard Hotham =

East India merchant, property developer and politician (1722-1799)

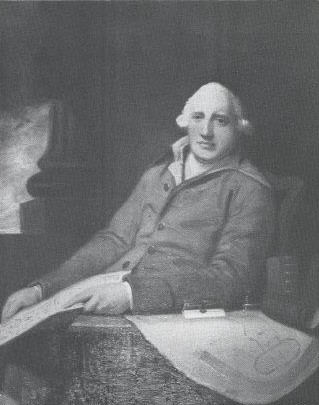
Sir Richard Hotham (1722–1799)

Sir Richard Hotham (5 October 1722 – 13 March 1799) was an East India merchant, property developer and politician who sat in the House of Commons from 1780 to 1784. He is especially noted for his development of the Sussex village of Bognor into a seaside resort. He was also sometimes called Hotham the Hatter, to mark his original trade.

== Early life ==
Hotham was born the youngest of five children in York in October 1722, but otherwise very little is known about his childhood. Having moved to London to become a hatter's apprentice, in 1743, at the age of 21 he married Frances Atkinson, the daughter of his employer, in the chapel of the Royal Hospital, Chelsea.

By 1746 he was trading as a hatter in his own right from premises in Serle Street, Lincoln's Inn, a few years later moving to new premises in The Strand.

Hotham's wife Frances died in 1760, and the next year, at the age of 39, he married Barbara Huddart. At this time he became involved with the East India Company, later working up to having a number of ships under his control – records at the British Library show him as 'Principal Managing Owner' of a number of vessels including the East Indiaman York. He received his knighthood on 2 April 1769 at the relatively young age of 46.

== Rise in society ==
Using the money he had made in this venture, Hotham began his long association with property development, first buying land and buildings in Merton, South London, including a house for himself known as Merton Grove. This has since been demolished and replaced by Victorian terraced houses including Balfour and Cecil Roads opposite South Wimbledon tube station. The house name was for many years remembered by the name of the Morden Road pub The Grove Hotel, which has in more recent years been acquired by Tesco as a Tesco Metro Supermarket.

During his time in Merton, Hotham was appointed a Magistrate, and in 1770 the High Sheriff of Surrey but suffered a further setback in 1777 when Barbara died, leaving him a widower for the second time at age 55.

Hotham began to be involved in politics, and at the 1780 general election he played a major part in the campaign to elect Admiral Keppel at Surrey. Hotham himself contested Southwark, and was returned as Member of Parliament for Surrey at the top of the poll. He did not stand at the 1784 general election but stood at the by-election at Southwark two months later in June 1784. He lost the contest very narrowly. In Parliament he voted with the opposition until the fall of the North government and made two speeches. In 1784 he was a member of the St. Alban's Tavern group who tried to bring Fox and Pitt together.

== Association with Bognor ==
Hotham found the climate of the south coast did him the world of good, and decided that he would like to have a house of his own there and accordingly bought a plot of land containing a farmhouse, near the sea. He then set about rebuilding the farmhouse as a comfortable villa which he named Bognor Lodge (this has since been demolished).

Following his own experience of the curative nature of the sea air, and the current trend for the gentry to resort to the seaside, his property developing side kicked in, and with an eye to gaining some of the fame and wealth of places like Brighton and Weymouth he set about buying land in the area until eventually he had around 1,600 acres (6.5 km^{2}) in his ownership. Then the building started.

He built a number of large terraces of houses around the tiny hamlet, with the express aim of attracting the more well-heeled visitor to his new resort, the ultimate goal being to attract the King away from his favoured resort at Weymouth, or the Prince of Wales from Brighton.

Ultimately, this was to be unrealised, although minor members of the Royal Family were attracted to stay in the grand new Dome House, built overlooking Richard's new house and grounds known as Bersted Lodge. Complete with private chapel and clock tower, this house still stands, now known as Hotham Park House. The chapel has gone but the clock tower remains.

Sir Richard Hotham died at Bognor in March 1799 and was buried at the parish church of St. Mary Magdalene at South Bersted, where to this day there is an annual wreath laying ceremony at his grave.

== Legacy ==
Following his death the estate was broken up and in the intervening years many of his fine buildings have vanished, although some gems remain, including Hotham Park House, now a private residence in the middle of Hotham Park. The grounds of Aldwick Manor are now a public park known as Hotham Park, and although the name Hothampton did not long survive the man himself, the resort he founded, now known as Bognor Regis, has continued to attract visitors to the present day.

Parliament of Great Britain
Preceded by Henry Thrale; Nathaniel Polhill	Member of Parliament for Southwark; 1780 – 1784; With: Nathaniel Polhill to 1782; Henry Thornton from 1782	Succeeded by Sir Barnard Turner; Henry Thornton
