= Otter Gallery =

English art gallery

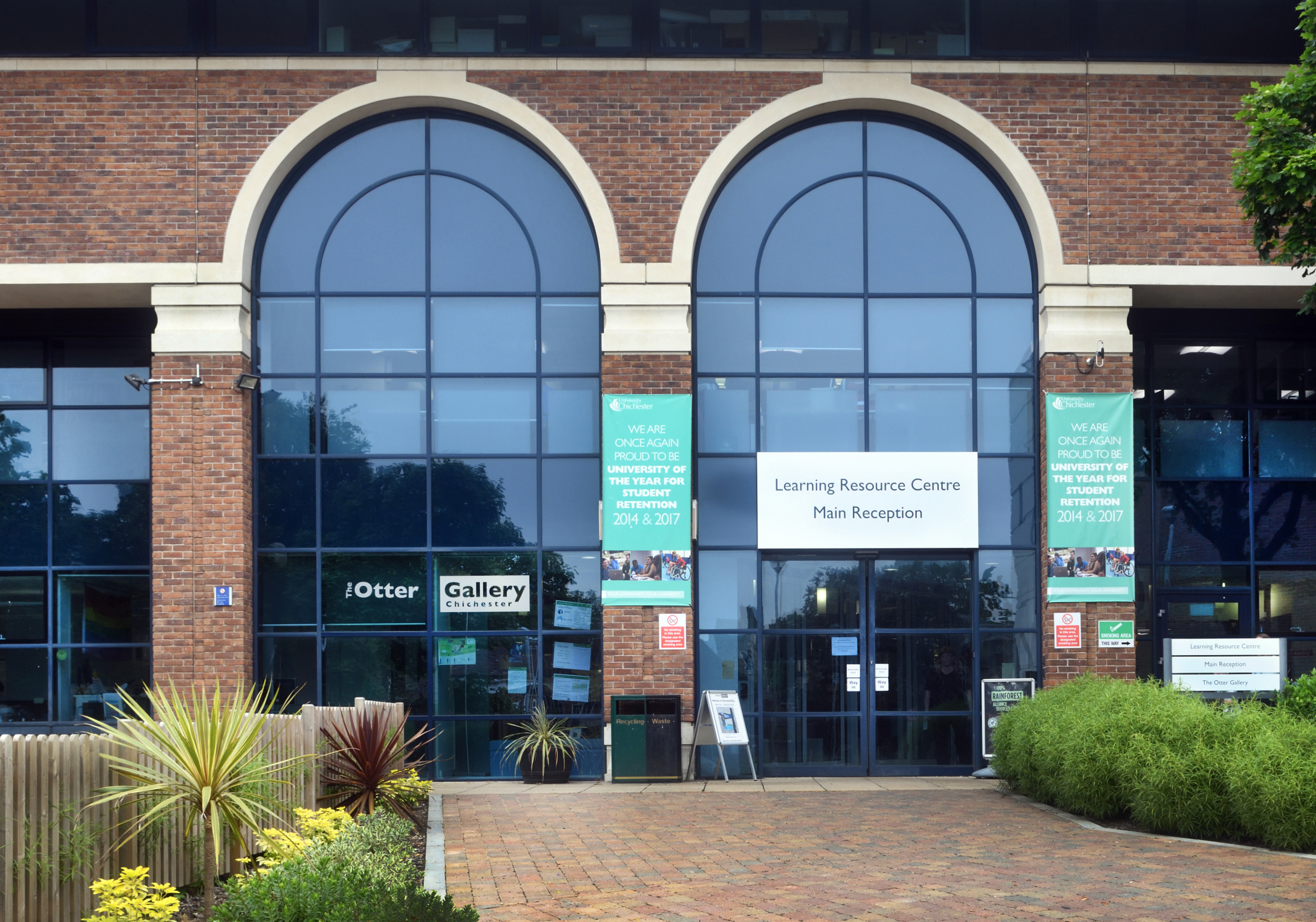
Entrance to the Otter Gallery at the University of Chichester, College Lane, Chichester, West Sussex, UK. Location: 50°50′41″N 0°46′28″W

The Otter Gallery was an art gallery at the University of Chichester's College Lane campus, which hosted exhibitions, lectures and events including sculpture, paintings and photographs. The Gallery was responsible for maintaining the University Art Collection which started in 1947. It holds one of the Founder Partner collections of Art UK and is represented on its website. The Otter Gallery and its Bishop Otter Art Collection are also listed with the International Committee for Museums and Collections.

Eleanor Hipwell was head of art at Bishop Otter College and acquired three paintings from an exhibition held at the Victoria and Albert Museum in order to display them at the university. When Miss K. E. Murray was appointed as a new principal, she along with Eleanor Hipwell's successor, Sheila McCririck, developed a collection of contemporary British art that would inform and inspire students.

The Collection is still held intact by The Bishop Otter Trust, and includes work by important 20th Century artists such as Patrick Heron, Stanley Spencer, Henry Moore, Paul Nash, Mary Fedden, Sandra Blow, Jill Bray, Ivon Hitchens, and John Hitchens.

The University of Chichester closed the Otter Gallery permanently in October 2018, despite public protests and attempts to save it.

== Publications ==
‘The Bishop Otter Art Collection - A Celebration’, edited by Gill Clarke, Sansom & Co., 2016, ISBN 978-1-911408-01-7
