= Bognor Regis =

Town in West Sussex

Coordinates: 50.78237°N 0.67639°W

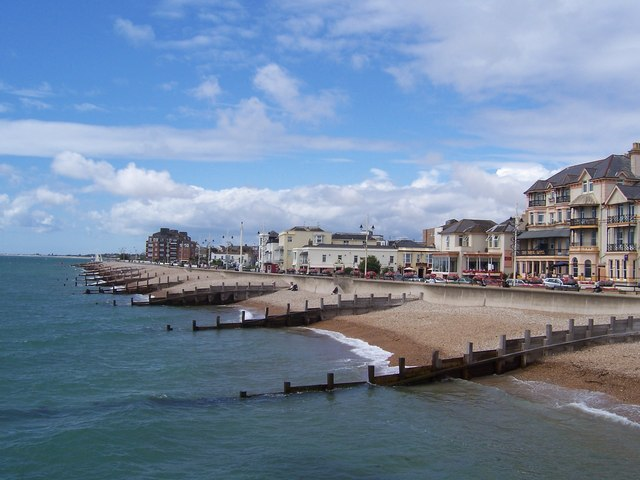
- Bognor Regis' seafront as viewed from the pier in 2007

- Location within West Sussex
- Area: 4.41 km^{2} (1.70 sq mi)
- Population: 25,011 (Parish, 2021); 68,435 (Built up area, 2021)
- Demonym: Bognorian
- OS grid reference: SZ934989
  - London: 55 miles (89 km) NNE
- Civil parish: Bognor Regis
- District: Arun
- Shire county: West Sussex
- Region: South East
- Country: England
- Sovereign state: United Kingdom
- Post town: BOGNOR REGIS
- Postcode district: PO21, PO22
- Dialling code: 01243
- Police: Sussex
- Fire: West Sussex
- Ambulance: South East Coast
- UK Parliament: Bognor Regis and Littlehampton
- Website: Bognor Regis Town Council

Bognor Regis (/ˌbɒɡnər ˈriːdʒɪs/), also known as Bognor, is a town, seaside resort and civil parish in the Arun district, in West Sussex on the south coast of England, 56 miles (90 km) south-west of London, 24 miles (39 km) west of Brighton, 6 miles (10 km) south-east of Chichester and 16 miles (26 km) east of Portsmouth. Other nearby towns include Littlehampton east-north-east and Selsey to the south-west. The nearby villages of Felpham, and Aldwick are now suburbs of Bognor Regis, along with those of North and South Bersted. The population of the Bognor Regis built-up area, including Felpham and Aldwick, was 63,855 at the 2011 census.

A seaside resort was developed by Sir Richard Hotham in the late 18th century on what was a sand and gravel, undeveloped coastline. It has been claimed that Hotham and his new resort are portrayed in Jane Austen's unfinished novel Sanditon. The resort grew slowly in the first half of the 19th century but grew rapidly following the coming of the railway in 1864. In 1929 King George V spent three months in the area recuperating, and later that year the town's name was changed to "Bognor Regis" by royal consent. Butlin's has been present in the town since the early 1930s when an amusement park and zoo were opened. A holiday camp followed in 1960 and this has more recently moved towards hotel accommodation with modern amenities.

== Etymology ==
Bognor is one of the oldest recorded Anglo-Saxon place names in Sussex. In a document of AD 680, it is referred to as Bucgan ora meaning Bucge's (a female Anglo-Saxon name) shore, or landing place.

== History ==
Bognor Regis was originally named just "Bognor", being a fishing (and smuggling) village, with a port or haven on the Aldingbourne Rife, until the 18th century when it was converted into a resort by Sir Richard Hotham who renamed the settlement Hothamton, although this did not catch on. It has been postulated that Hotham and his new resort are portrayed in Jane Austen's unfinished novel Sanditon.

On the beach between Bognor Regis and Aldwick lies the wreck of a floating pontoon (caisson) which was once part of the Mulberry floating harbours used by the Allies to invade the French coast on D-Day 6 June 1944. It broke free in a storm on 4 June, the day before it was due to go over the English Channel to Arromanches, and was abandoned. It washed up on the beach shortly after D-Day.

There is a memorial to the brave men who were involved in the Mulberry Harbour project. The memorial was placed there in June 1999, and states: "To mark the 55th Anniversary of D-Day in 1944. This plaque is erected as a memorial to mark the historical association that Pagham Beach had with the Mulberry Harbour Project in support of the liberation of Europe." The plaque continues 'some 50 had been assembled between Pagham beach and Selsey. To hide them from enemy view they were sunk to await refloating when the invasion got under way'. Finally, the plaque records "The Mulberry Harbour project was without doubt, a great feat of British and allied engineering skills, many still remain at Arromanches in Normandy."

The historic meeting of the crews (and associated handshake) of the Apollo–Soyuz Test Project on 17 July 1975 was intended to have taken place over Bognor Regis, but a flight delay caused it to occur over Metz in France instead.

Bognor Regis town centre was damaged in 1994 by an IRA device left in a bicycle outside Woolworth's. Fifteen shops were damaged but no injuries occurred.

=== "Bugger Bognor" ===
King George V had become ill, requiring lung surgery to be carried out on 12 December 1928. His recovery was slow and on 22 January 1929 Buckingham Palace issued the statement saying "it has been realised by the King's medical advisers that, prior to the establishment of convalescence, there would arrive a time when sea air would be necessary in order to secure the continuation of His Majesty's progress". The Palace statement went on "with the knowledge, a careful search was made for a 'residence' not only suitable in itself but possessing the necessary attributes of close proximity to the sea, southern exposure, protection from wind, privacy and reasonable access to and from London." The residence selected was Craigweil House, Bognor (demolished in 1939) placed at the king's disposal by owner Sir Arthur Du Cros who was a wealthy businessman, having acquired the house from Dr Stocker who bought it from the Countess of Newburgh who had constructed the building in 1806. The house was technically just outside Bognor, being at Aldwick in the neighbouring parish of Pagham. Following his stay, the Bognor Urban District Council petitioned the king to bestow the suffix "Regis" ("of the King") on the town. The petition was presented to Lord Stamfordham, the king's private secretary, who in turn delivered it to the king. King George supposedly replied, "Oh, bugger Bognor." Lord Stamfordham then went back to the petitioners and told them, "the King has been graciously pleased to grant your request." The change of name from Bognor to Bognor Regis formally took effect on 26 July 1929. Four years later in 1933 the town's boundaries were enlarged, with Craigweil House and Aldwick being within the area added.

A slightly different version of the "Bugger Bognor" incident is that the King, upon being told, shortly before his death, that he would soon be well enough to revisit the town, uttered the words "Bugger Bognor!" Although there is little evidence that these words were actually spoken in this context, and although the sea air helped the King to regain his health, it is certain that the King had little regard for the town.

=== Butlins ===
Billy Butlin made his first appearance in the town with his Recreation Shelter, which was situated on the corner of Lennox Street and the Esplanade. The Recreation Shelter was to prove to be a popular entertainment venue, containing one-armed-bandits and dodgem cars. This was eventually followed on 5 July 1933 by the Butlin Zoo on the seafront, which contained a wide array of animals, including brown, black and polar bears, hyenas, leopards, pelicans, kangaroos, monkeys and "Togo the snake king". Within three years, Billy Butlin was opening his first holiday centre at Skegness. Eventually, in 1958, the Bognor Regis town council announced that they had reached an agreement with Butlin to take on the 39 acre Brookland site to build a holiday camp, the site on which Butlins still stands today. The camp first opened to the public on 2 July 1960.

== Governance and politics ==
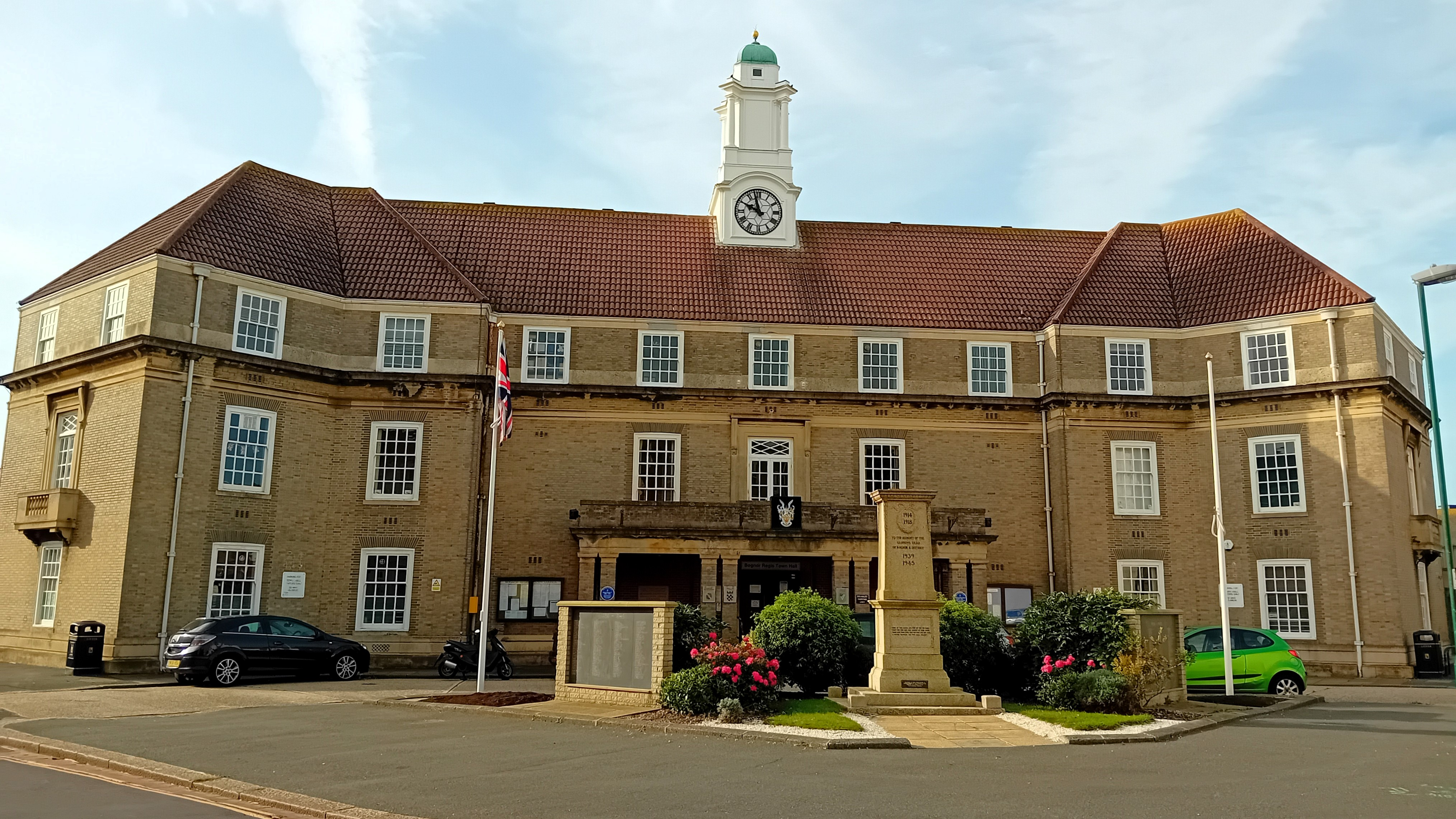
Bognor Regis Town Hall

There are three tiers of local government covering Bognor Regis, at parish (town), district and county level: Bognor Regis Town Council, Arun District Council and West Sussex County Council. The town council is based at the Town Hall on Clarence Road. Bognor is an electoral ward of Arun District.

Coat of arms of Bognor Regis Town Council

Notes
Granted to the urban district council on 10 April 1935.
Crest
On a Wreath of the Colours between two Gull's Wings Azure a Saxon Crown Gules.
Motto
To Excel

Bognor Regis is in the parliamentary constituency of Bognor Regis and Littlehampton, whose current Member of Parliament is Alison Griffiths. Previously it was in the constituencies of Arundel (1974–1997) and Chichester (1885–1974).

Bognor was historically part of the ancient parish of Pagham and the wider Hundred of Aldwick, an ancient division of Chichester Rape. From around 1465 it was included in the parish of South Bersted. In 1822 improvement commissioners were established to govern the town. The commissioners were replaced by a local board in 1867. Such local board districts were reconstituted as urban districts in 1894, when the civil parish of South Bersted was also split; the part in the Bognor urban district became a parish called Bognor and the part outside the urban district became a parish called Bersted. Bognor had already become a separate ecclesiastical parish from South Bersted in 1873.

The urban district council built Bognor Regis Town Hall to serve as its headquarters. The building was designed by Charles Cowles-Voysey and completed in 1930. The urban district was renamed Bognor Regis in 1929, and was significantly enlarged in 1933, absorbing the neighbouring parish of Felpham and the Aldwick area from the parish of Pagham.

Bognor Regis Urban District was abolished in 1974, becoming part of Arun District. No successor parish was created for the former urban district at the time, and so it became an unparished area, directly administered by Arun District Council. Three new civil parishes were subsequently created covering the former urban district in 1985: Bognor Regis, Aldwick and Felpham.

== Geography ==
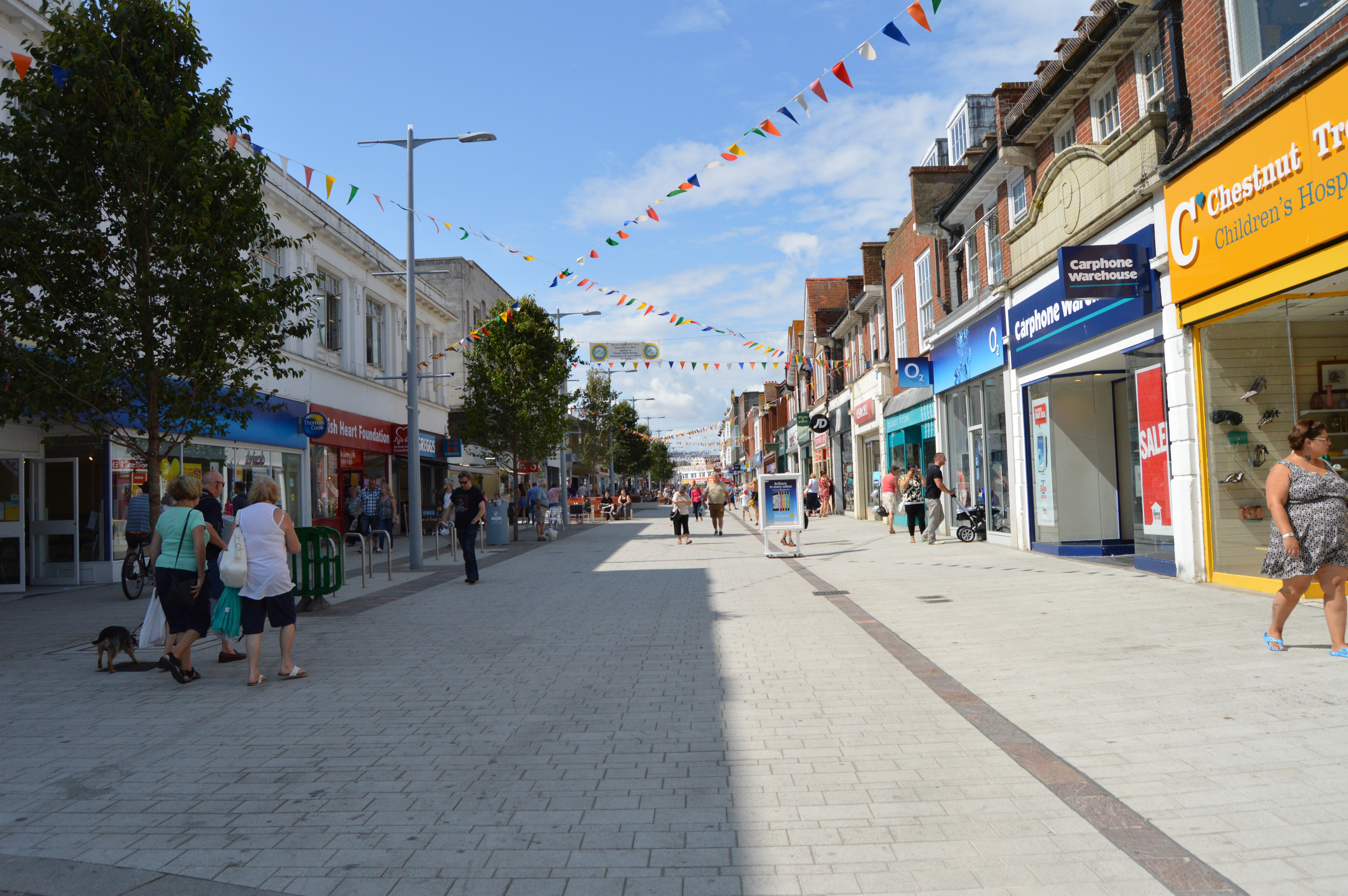
The shopping precinct

The town has several areas, and buildings, that still link it with its past. Good examples, and prominent local landmarks, are the Royal Norfolk Hotel and Hotham Park.

The Anglican parish church is dedicated to St. Wilfrid while the local Roman Catholic church is Our Lady of Sorrows Church.

=== Climate ===
Bognor Regis experiences an oceanic climate (Köppen climate classification Cfb) similar to almost all of the United Kingdom albeit sunnier and milder due to its proximity to the coast. Besides inhibiting summer cloud development, its coastal location also prevents extreme temperatures; Whereas locations in the Sussex Weald, to the North, can, on occasion, fall below −15.0 °C (5.0 °F) or rise above 35.0 °C (95.0 °F), since 1960, the temperatures recorded at Bognor have never fallen below −9.4 °C (15.1 °F) (January 1963) or risen above 31.5 °C (88.7 °F) (June 1976). Rainfall in Bognor peaks during the winter months, and reaches a minimum in summer, as is typical for the South Coast of England.

Climate data for Bognor Regis (1991–2020 normals, extremes 1901–2023)
Month	Jan	Feb	Mar	Apr	May	Jun	Jul	Aug	Sep	Oct	Nov	Dec	Year
Record high °C (°F)	14.4 (57.9)	16.4 (61.5)	18.9 (66.0)	24.8 (76.6)	27.2 (81.0)	31.5 (88.7)	31.1 (88.0)	32.2 (90.0)	27.7 (81.9)	25.0 (77.0)	18.4 (65.1)	16.1 (61.0)	32.2 (90.0)
Mean daily maximum °C (°F)	8.4 (47.1)	8.6 (47.5)	10.8 (51.4)	13.5 (56.3)	16.6 (61.9)	19.2 (66.6)	21.3 (70.3)	21.4 (70.5)	19.3 (66.7)	15.7 (60.3)	11.8 (53.2)	9.1 (48.4)	14.7 (58.5)
Daily mean °C (°F)	5.9 (42.6)	5.9 (42.6)	7.6 (45.7)	9.9 (49.8)	12.9 (55.2)	15.6 (60.1)	17.7 (63.9)	17.8 (64.0)	15.7 (60.3)	12.6 (54.7)	9.0 (48.2)	6.5 (43.7)	11.4 (52.6)
Mean daily minimum °C (°F)	3.4 (38.1)	3.2 (37.8)	4.4 (39.9)	6.3 (43.3)	9.1 (48.4)	12.0 (53.6)	14.1 (57.4)	14.1 (57.4)	12.0 (53.6)	9.5 (49.1)	6.2 (43.2)	3.9 (39.0)	8.2 (46.8)
Record low °C (°F)	−11.1 (12.0)	−9.4 (15.1)	−6.2 (20.8)	−4.1 (24.6)	−0.7 (30.7)	3.3 (37.9)	6.0 (42.8)	5.6 (42.1)	1.1 (34.0)	−6.7 (19.9)	−8.8 (16.2)	−10.4 (13.3)	−11.1 (12.0)
Average precipitation mm (inches)	82.5 (3.25)	54.7 (2.15)	45.8 (1.80)	45.4 (1.79)	42.8 (1.69)	48.6 (1.91)	43.7 (1.72)	53.6 (2.11)	57.1 (2.25)	84.5 (3.33)	87.5 (3.44)	87.7 (3.45)	733.9 (28.89)
Average precipitation days (≥ 1.0 mm)	12.7	9.5	8.5	8.4	7.2	7.2	7.1	8.0	8.2	11.4	13.0	12.4	113.6
Mean monthly sunshine hours	74.7	92.8	137.2	197.8	235.0	237.9	253.7	232.7	176.6	129.9	85.4	65.1	1,918.5
Source 1: Met Office
Source 2: Starlings Roost Weather

== Tourism ==
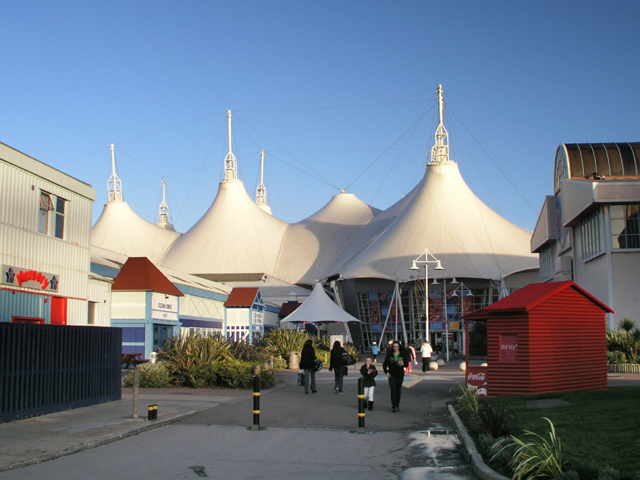
Butlin's Bognor Regis Resort

Billy Butlin opened one of his Butlin's Holiday Camps in Bognor in 1960. The camp later became known as Southcoast World until 1998 and is now known as Butlin's Bognor Regis Resort. In 1999 Butlin's erected a large indoor leisure park, with the building's design sharing some similarities with the Millennium Dome in London. In 2005, a new £10m hotel, called "The Shoreline" was unveiled at the Bognor Regis resort. A second hotel "The Ocean" opened on the site in Summer 2009 and general landscaping and upgrading have also taken place. A third hotel "Wave" opened in Summer 2012.

In 2017 Bognor Regis Town Council appointed a town crier to promote tourism. Jane Smith can be seen regularly during the year, giving proclamations in the town and along the seafront in her regal purple and gold livery.

== Culture and community ==
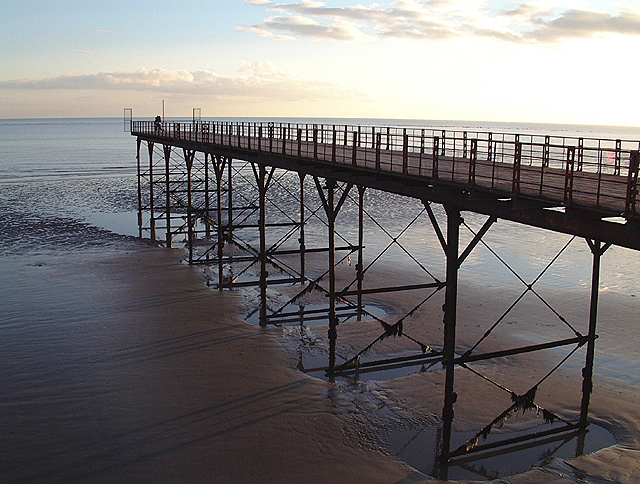
Bognor Regis Pier at low tide

The International Bognor Birdman is an annual competition for human-powered 'flying' machines held each summer on Bognor Regis Pier. Contestants launch themselves from the end of the pier, a prize being awarded to the one who glides the furthest distance. Rarely taken completely seriously, the event provides competitors with an opportunity to construct improbable machines complete with outlandish dress, and is viewed as a display of British eccentricity. The spectacle draws a sizeable crowd in addition to the local media. Inaugurated in nearby Selsey in 1971, the Birdman transferred to Bognor in 1978 when it had outgrown its original location. Competitors have included Richard Branson.

The Birdman Event of 2008 was transferred to Worthing after 60 feet (18 m) of the pier had been removed by the owners due to storm damage in March 2008. This meant that there were questions over the safety of contestants landing in shallower water. The shortened pier was judged safe for the event in 2010, which returned to Bognor.

Bognor Rox free music and arts festival is held each summer. 2015 was to be the 25th anniversary of the ROX Music and Arts Festival which attracts over 30,000 visitors and features many genres of music in seven performance areas over two days. The town is also home to the Bognor Regis Concert Band, who perform at various local locations and events, including the yearly "Proms in the Park" hosted at Hotham Park.

The Picturedrome Cinema in London Road has been trading as a cinema for over 100 years. It has been extensively refurbished, the freehold having been acquired by the Bognor Regis Town Council to secure the building's future, after extensive consultation.

The Alexandra Theatre is a 357-seat auditorium showing a variety of entertainment from comedy to drama to pantomime. It was built in 1979 on the site of the former Edwardian Theatre Royal complex. It is currently run by a voluntary trust and shows a mixture of local groups, tribute bands and concerts.

The film The Punch and Judy Man (1963), starring Tony Hancock, was partly shot in Bognor Regis. Several scenes of the film Wish You Were Here (1987) were also filmed in Bognor Regis. The BBC series Don't Forget the Driver (2019) starring Toby Jones was filmed and set in Bognor.

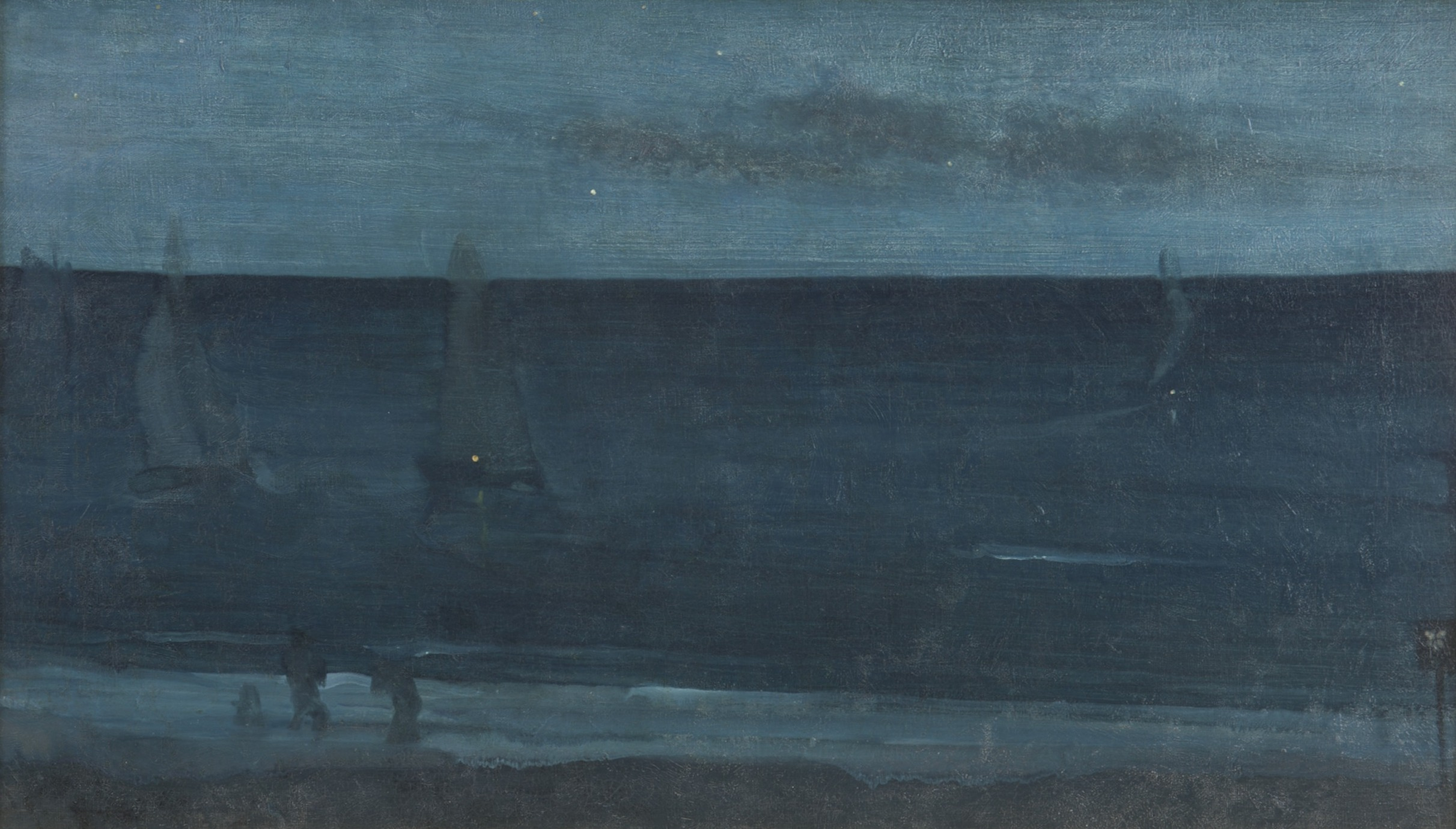
Nocturne: Blue and Silver—Bognor painted by James McNeill Whistler in 1871.

Bognor Regis War Memorial Hospital first opened in 1919 and is managed by the Sussex Community NHS Trust.

== Media ==
Local news and television programmes are provided by BBC South and ITV Meridian, received from Rowridge transmitting station. Local radio stations are V2 Radio, BBC Radio Sussex, Heart South, Greatest Hits Radio West Sussex and Passion Radio. Bognor Regis Observer is the town's local newspaper.

== Education ==
Bognor Regis has two secondary schools, The Regis School and Felpham Community College. The area also has several primary schools, both in Bognor Regis and Felpham.

Bognor Regis also hosts a university campus of the University of Chichester.

== Sport and leisure ==
Bognor Regis Town F.C. plays in the Isthmian Premier Division. They play their home games at Nyewood Lane.

Middleton & Bognor Hockey Club play their home matches at Littlehampton Academy.

Bognor is home to No.17 detachment of the Sussex Army Cadet Force, a volunteer youth organisation, sponsored by the Ministry of Defence, which accepts cadets aged between 12 and 18 years of age.

There are two cricket clubs: Bognor Regis Cricket Club and Pagham Cricket Club.

== Transport ==
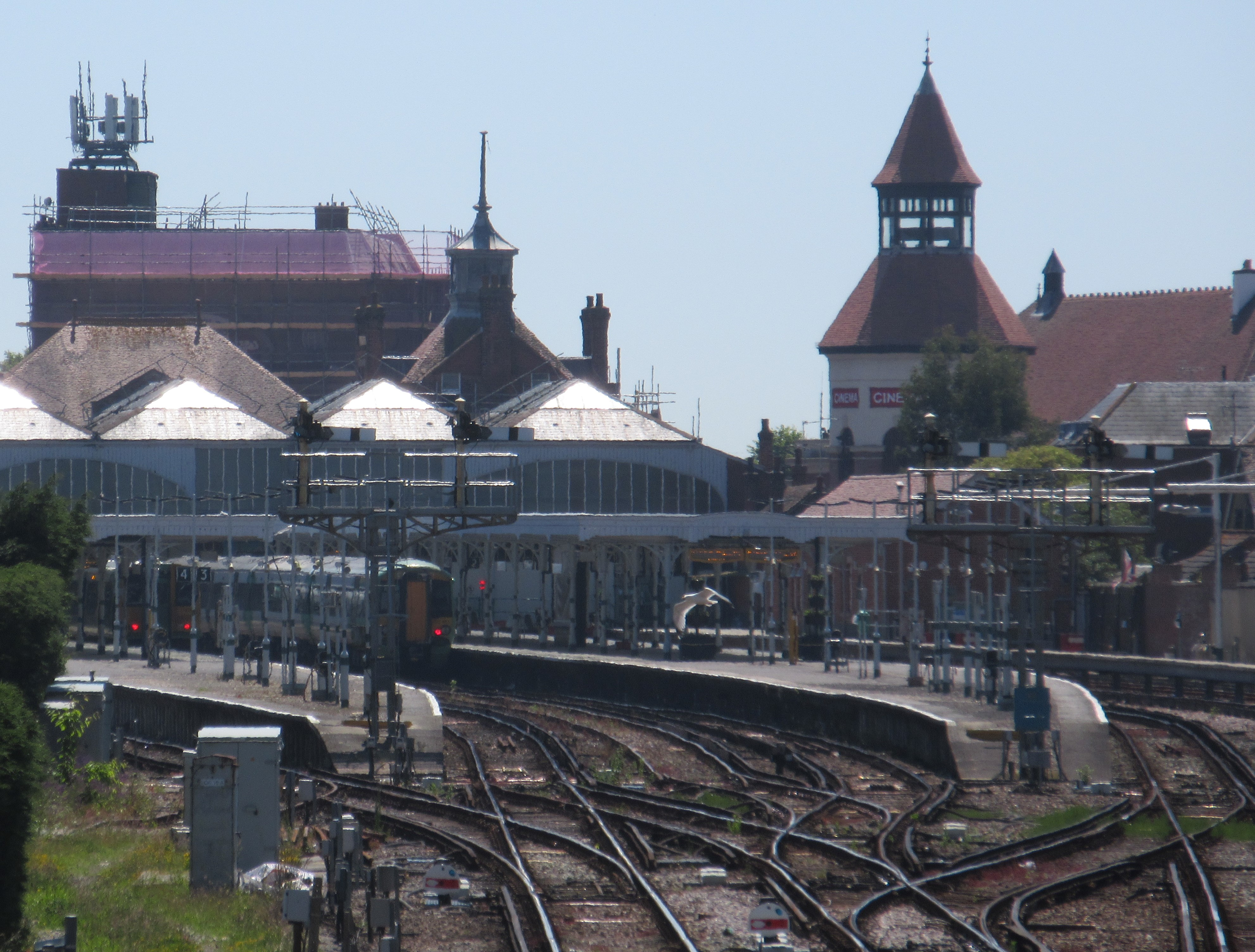
Bognor Regis railway station

Bognor Regis railway station is on a branch line from Barnham, on the West Coastway Line. It has half-hourly services to London and connecting shuttles to Barnham, where passengers can change for services to other towns and cities along the south coast. Trains are operated by Southern using Class 377s.

- Road links
  - A29. Towards Dorking to the north, south of which it joins the A24 to London. This road bisects the main east–west trunk road, the A27, at Fontwell and the A272 at Billingshurst.
  - A259. The coastal road running along the south coast from Havant in Hampshire to Folkestone in Kent.

== Twin towns ==
Bognor Regis is twinned with:

- Saint-Maur-des-Fossés, France
- Weil am Rhein, Germany
- Trebbin, Germany

== Notable people ==
- Sir Richard Hotham (1722–1799), property developer and politician helped develop Bognor Regis as a seaside resort.
- William Blake (1757–1827), artist, mystic, and poet. Lived in Felpham for 3 years while apprenticed to William Hayley.
- Dante Gabriel Rossetti (1828–1882), one of the founders of the Pre-Raphaelite Brotherhood, painter and poet; worked at a studio in Belmont Street from 1875 to 1876.
- Mary Wheatland (1835–1924), swimming instructor and lifesaver. Saved over 30 people from drowning off the town's beaches.
- Frederick Albert Bridge (1841–1917), photographer, died after a fall while on holiday in Bognor.
- James Joyce (1882–1941), novelist, author of Ulysses; worked on Finnegans Wake while staying in Bognor in 1923.
- Eric Coates (1886–1957), composer of marches and rhapsodies including The Knightsbridge March, By the Sleepy Lagoon and The Dam Busters March.
- Cynthia Payne (1932–2015), brothel keeper, born in Bognor.
- Edward Morris (1940–2016), art historian, born in Bognor.
- Bruce Cripps (born 1941), known professionally as Bruce Welch, is an English guitarist, songwriter, producer, singer and businessman best known as a founding member of the Shadows.
- David Purley (1945–1985), Formula One driver, best known for his attempt to save the life of fellow racing driver Roger Williamson during the 1973 Dutch Grand Prix, was born in Bognor Regis, where he was killed after crashing his aerobatic biplane into the sea off Bognor on 2 July 1985.
- Jim Howick (born 1979), actor and writer. Grew up in Bognor.
- Tobias James Smith (born 2003), known online as Tubbo, is a Twitch streamer and YouTuber who lived in Bognor.

== See also ==
- Regis (place)
- List of place names with royal patronage in the United Kingdom
- List of places of worship in Arun
